= Woodridge, New Zealand =

Suburb of Wellington City, New Zealand

Coordinates: 41°12′59″S 174°49′57″E

Woodridge
- Suburb
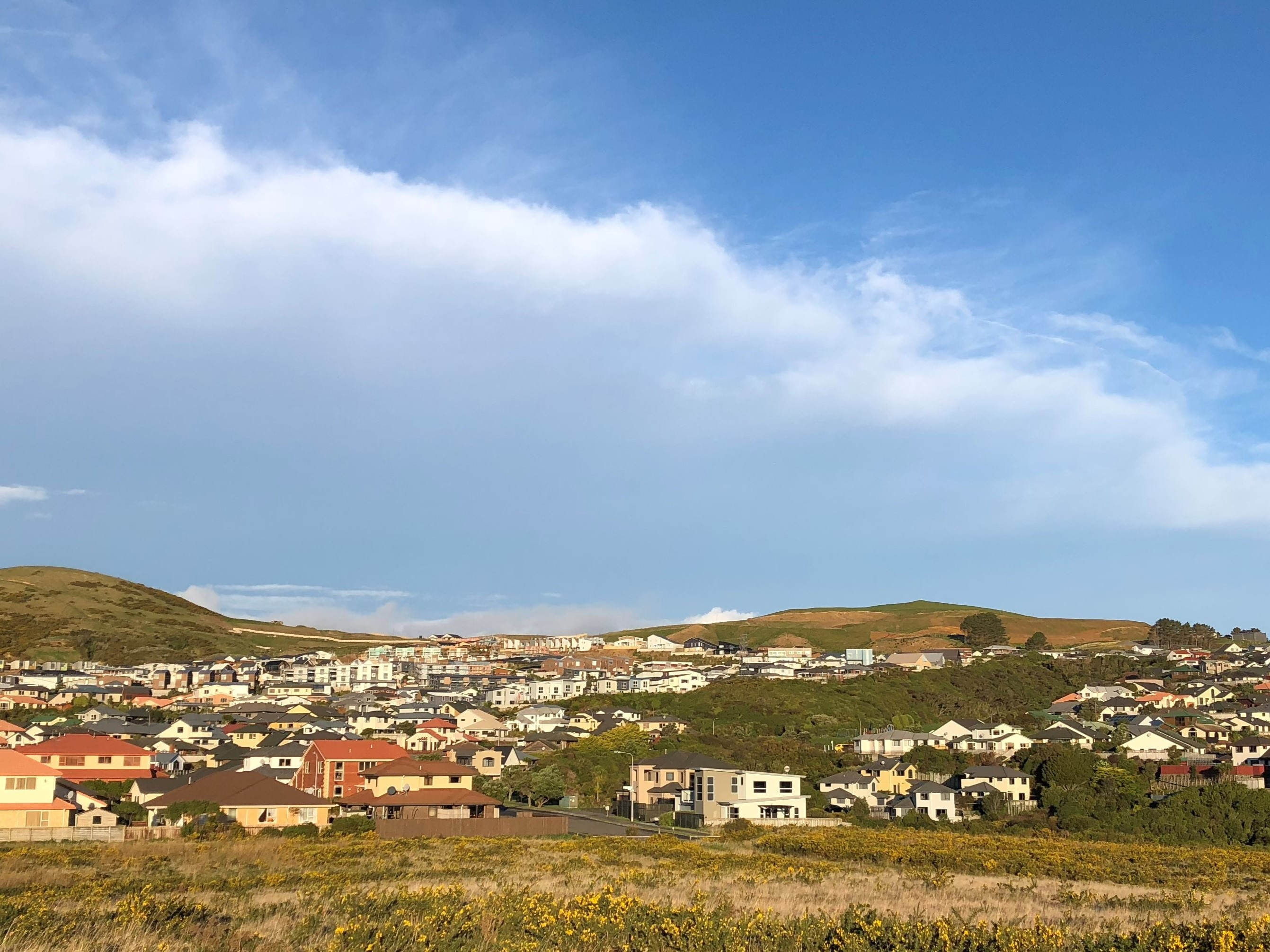
- Interactive map of Woodridge
- Country: New Zealand
- City: Wellington
- Local authority: Wellington City Council
- Electoral ward: Takapū/Northern Ward; Te Whanganui-a-Tara Māori Ward

Area
  - Land: 99 ha (240 acres)

Population (June 2025)
  - Total: 2,070
  - Density: 2,100/km^{2} (5,400/sq mi)
- Postcode: 6037

	Grenada
Newlands	Woodridge	Horokiwi
Glenside	Paparangi

Woodridge is one of the northern suburbs of Wellington, New Zealand, north of Newlands and Paparangi.

== History ==
Woodridge Estate began in the 1980s after Norman Wright bought the Newlands dairy farm from J.S. Meadowcroft (who also owned Broadmeadows), and began to divide portions into lots. The Wright family chose trees and wood as a theme, and most streets bear the names of trees. By 2011 about half the planned houses or 200 homes had been built. A land exchange with the WCC allowed for development of a walkway to Seton Nossiter Park.

== Demographics ==
Woodridge statistical area covers 0.99 km^{2} (0.38 sq mi). It had an estimated population of 2,070 as of June 2025, with a population density of 2,091 people per km^{2}.

Historical population
Year	Pop.	±% p.a.
2006	975	—
2013	1,266	+3.80%
2018	1,605	+4.86%
2023	1,914	+3.58%

Woodridge had a population of 1,914 in the 2023 New Zealand census, an increase of 309 people (19.3%) since the 2018 census, and an increase of 648 people (51.2%) since the 2013 census. There were 930 males, 972 females, and 9 people of other genders in 666 dwellings. 3.8% of people identified as LGBTIQ+. The median age was 36.4 years (compared with 38.1 years nationally). There were 411 people (21.5%) aged under 15 years, 348 (18.2%) aged 15 to 29, 1,032 (53.9%) aged 30 to 64, and 120 (6.3%) aged 65 or older.

People could identify as more than one ethnicity. The results were 45.0% European (Pākehā); 5.5% Māori; 3.4% Pasifika; 50.3% Asian; 3.4% Middle Eastern, Latin American and African New Zealanders (MELAA); and 2.2% other, which includes people giving their ethnicity as "New Zealander". English was spoken by 93.6%, Māori by 1.3%, Samoan by 1.3%, and other languages by 38.9%. No language could be spoken by 2.7% (e.g. too young to talk). New Zealand Sign Language was known by 0.6%. The percentage of people born overseas was 48.4, compared with 28.8% nationally.

Religious affiliations were 30.6% Christian, 17.6% Hindu, 2.4% Islam, 0.3% Māori religious beliefs, 3.9% Buddhist, 0.2% New Age, and 2.0% other religions. People who answered that they had no religion were 39.3%, and 3.9% of people did not answer the census question.

Of those at least 15 years old, 741 (49.3%) people had a bachelor's or higher degree, 531 (35.3%) had a post-high school certificate or diploma, and 222 (14.8%) people exclusively held high school qualifications. The median income was $69,000, compared with $41,500 nationally. 447 people (29.7%) earned over $100,000 compared to 12.1% nationally. The employment status of those at least 15 was 1,017 (67.7%) full-time, 144 (9.6%) part-time, and 33 (2.2%) unemployed.

== Parks and reserves ==
=== Hauora Reserve ===
Hauora Reserve is perched around the top of the large hill overlooking Woodridge, with entrances on Red Beech Avenue, Astelia Way and Cedarwood Street. The name of the reserve roughly translates to healthy wind in Māori, in reference to the famous high wind speeds in the Wellington region. The reserve contains a large walking track circling the grassy hill, marked by several stone cairns. A children's playground is located near the Red Beech Avenue area of the pathway.

=== Kentwood Drive Reserve ===
Kentwood Drive reserve is a large grassy area located on Kentwood Drive. A large children's playground is located here. A small stream flows down the east side of the reserve from a bush-clad gully.

=== Seton Nossiter Park ===
While not located in Woodridge itself, Seton Nossiter Park can be accessed via Lindsays Track. The trailhead begins in the reserve area on White Pine Avenue. Several paths connect Woodridge to Newlands and Grenada Village.

== Transport ==
=== Bus Services ===
Woodridge is served by several bus services which link it to the wider Wellington area, operated by Newlands Coach Services on behalf of Metlink Wellington.
