= Churton Park =

Suburb of Wellington City, New Zealand

- Suburb
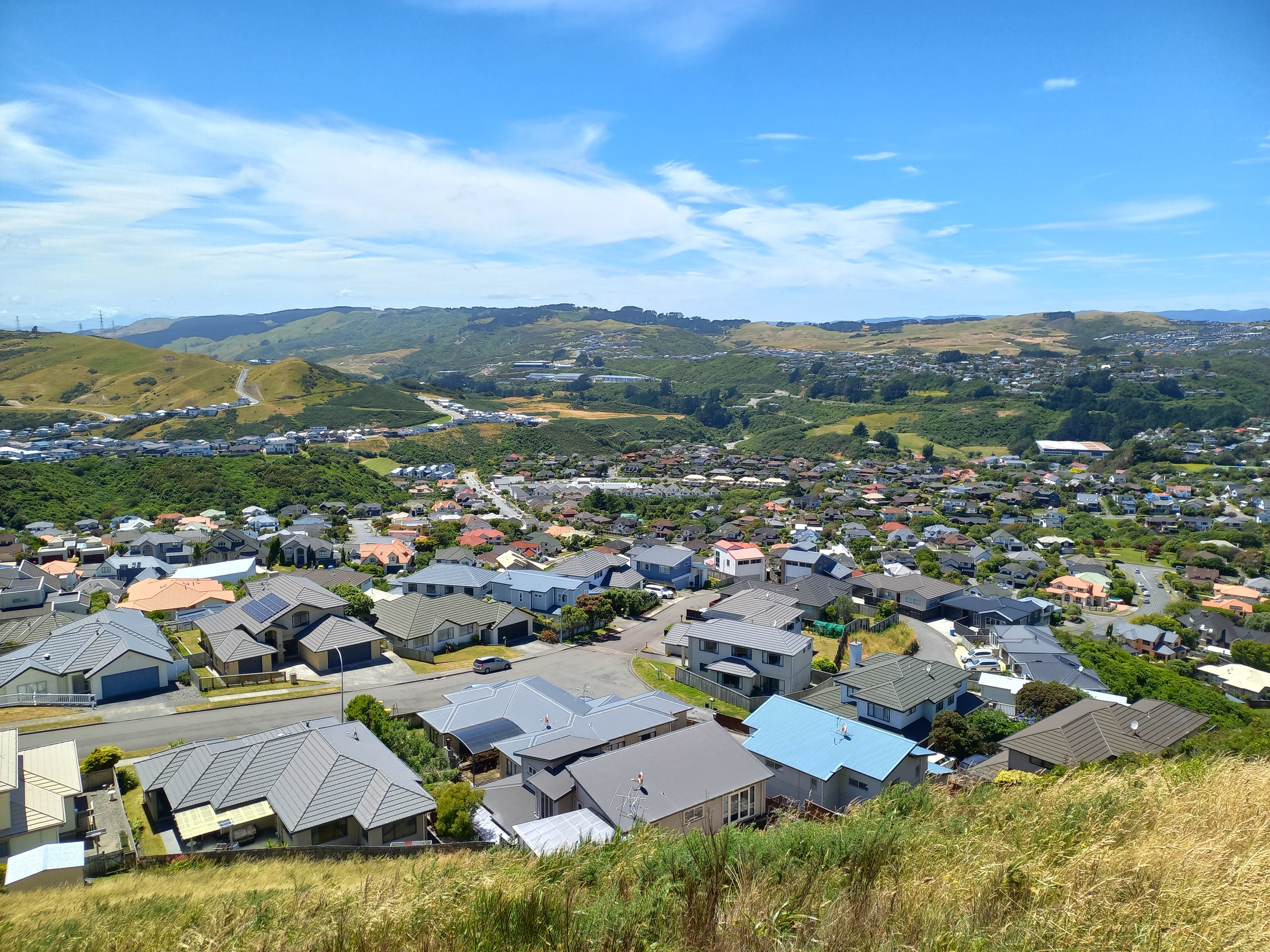
- View over Churton Park
- Interactive map of Churton Park
- Location within New Zealand Wellington
- Coordinates: 41°12′30″S 174°48′29″E
- Country: New Zealand
- City: Wellington
- Local authority: Wellington City Council
- Electoral ward: Takapū/Northern Ward; Te Whanganui-a-Tara Māori Ward

Area
  - Land: 606 ha (1,500 acres)

Population (June 2025)
  - Total: 8,990
  - Density: 1,480/km^{2} (3,840/sq mi)

	Redwood and Tawa
Ohariu	Churton Park	Grenada Village
	Johnsonville

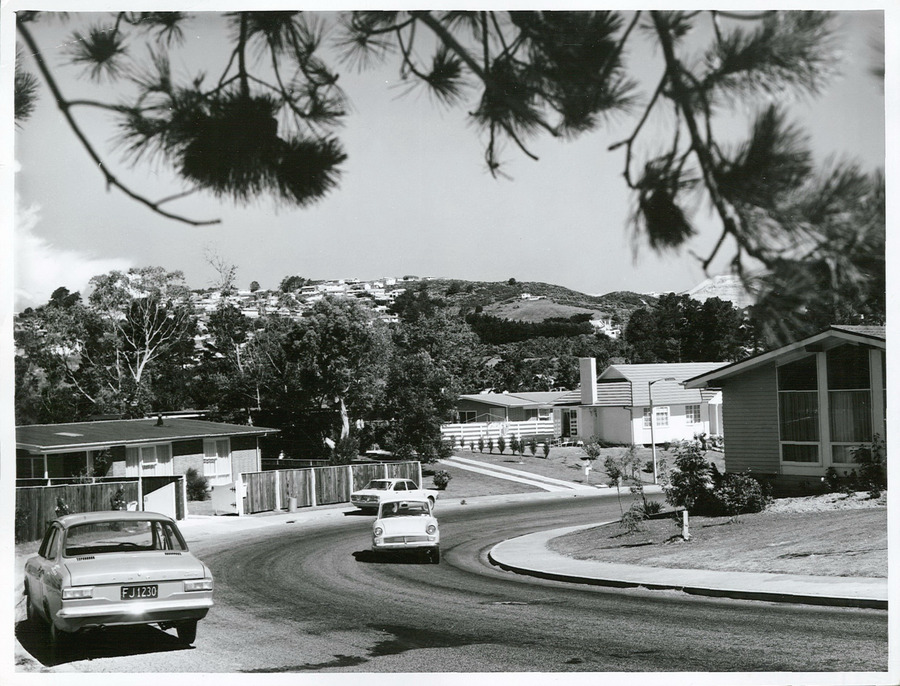
Churton Park in December 1970

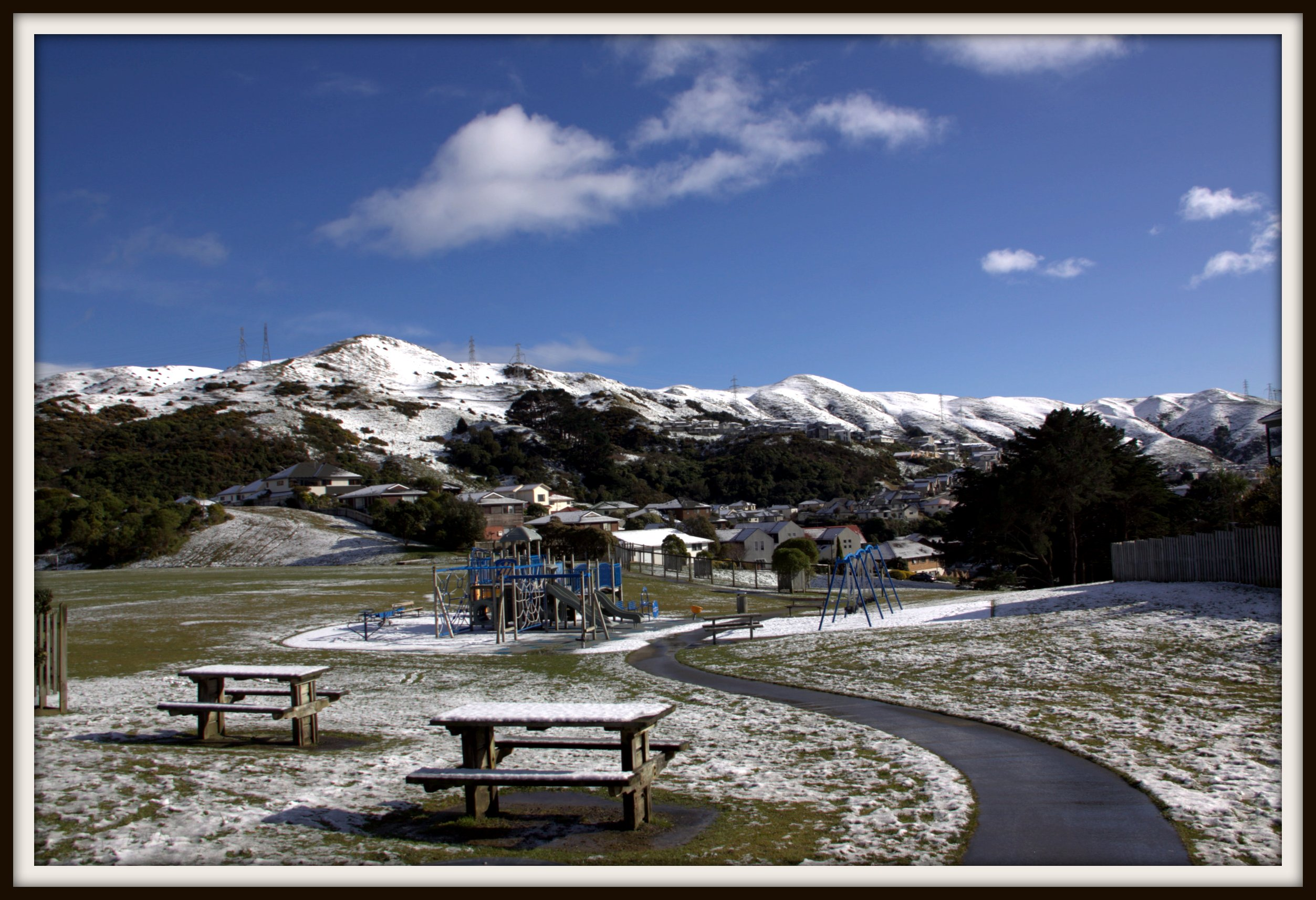
Churton Park after the 2011 snowfall

Churton Park is a suburb 1.5 km north of Johnsonville in Wellington, the capital city of New Zealand. It was established in the 1970s.

The suburb includes Churton Park Reserve which includes a recreational sports field, two primary schools and a kindergarten. The Churton Park Community Centre, which is managed and staffed by Wellington City Council, is also located in the Village.

== History ==
Churton Park is one of the youngest suburbs in Wellington and was farmland until 1970. In the 1850s Thomas Drake was running 200 sheep in what is now Churton Park.

The suburb was developed by "John Dick Walker" (1926–1981). It was named after Jock Churton; Churton was a director of Fletchers which undertook a number of development projects in the 1960s and 1970s. Rodney Callender now (2024) owns much of the adjacent land awaiting development.

The area of Churton Park near current Lakewood Avenue was originally a swamp and has been recently developed into residential housing and a commercial shopping centre. Since being established, it is one of the fasted growing subdivisions in Wellington, with the population expected to grow to over 12,000 over the next two decades.

In 2018, Wellington City Council purchased the 268 Ohariu Valley Rd property adding much of the ridge line overlooking Churton Park (from Ohariu Valley Rd to west of the Erlestoke Cres cul-de-sac) to the Outer Green Belt.

== Geography ==
The topography is quite hilly and has regenerating bush in some areas that has not been excavated for housing sub-divisions. Steep hills extend west over to Ohariu Valley. Extensive cut and fill earthworks have been required in the construction of the subdivisions for housing.

== Demographics ==
Churton Park covers 6.06 km^{2} (2.34 sq mi). It had an estimated population of 8,990 as of June 2025, with a population density of 1,483 people per km^{2}.

Historical population
Year	Pop.	±% p.a.
2006	5,853	—
2013	6,528	+1.57%
2018	7,260	+2.15%
2023	8,319	+2.76%
The 2006 population is for a smaller area of 5.96 km^{2}. Source:

Churton Park had a population of 8,319 in the 2023 New Zealand census, an increase of 1,059 people (14.6%) since the 2018 census, and an increase of 1,791 people (27.4%) since the 2013 census. There were 4,116 males, 4,170 females, and 33 people of other genders in 2,724 dwellings. 3.2% of people identified as LGBTIQ+. There were 1,707 people (20.5%) aged under 15 years, 1,530 (18.4%) aged 15 to 29, 4,152 (49.9%) aged 30 to 64, and 936 (11.3%) aged 65 or older.

People could identify as more than one ethnicity. The results were 52.7% European (Pākehā); 5.9% Māori; 4.5% Pasifika; 42.1% Asian; 3.0% Middle Eastern, Latin American and African New Zealanders (MELAA); and 2.8% other, which includes people giving their ethnicity as "New Zealander". English was spoken by 94.1%, Māori by 1.6%, Samoan by 0.8%, and other languages by 35.2%. No language could be spoken by 2.1% (e.g. too young to talk). New Zealand Sign Language was known by 0.5%. The percentage of people born overseas was 44.8, compared with 28.8% nationally.

Religious affiliations were 32.1% Christian, 8.5% Hindu, 1.6% Islam, 0.1% Māori religious beliefs, 3.1% Buddhist, 0.4% New Age, 0.1% Jewish, and 1.7% other religions. People who answered that they had no religion were 47.7%, and 4.7% of people did not answer the census question.

Of those at least 15 years old, 3,045 (46.1%) people had a bachelor's or higher degree, 2,502 (37.8%) had a post-high school certificate or diploma, and 1,071 (16.2%) people exclusively held high school qualifications. 1,878 people (28.4%) earned over $100,000 compared to 12.1% nationally. The employment status of those at least 15 was 4,035 (61.0%) full-time, 816 (12.3%) part-time, and 135 (2.0%) unemployed.

Individual statistical areas
Name	Area (km^{2})	Population	Density (per km^{2})	Dwellings	Median age	Median income
Churton Park North	2.31	4,383	1,897	1,329	37.8 years	$62,500
Glenside-Churton Park East	2.48	471	190	198	37.1 years	$68,200
Churton Park South	1.27	3,465	2,728	1,197	38.1 years	$61,800
New Zealand					38.1 years	$41,500

Semi panoramic image from the surrounding hills of Churton Park

== Education ==
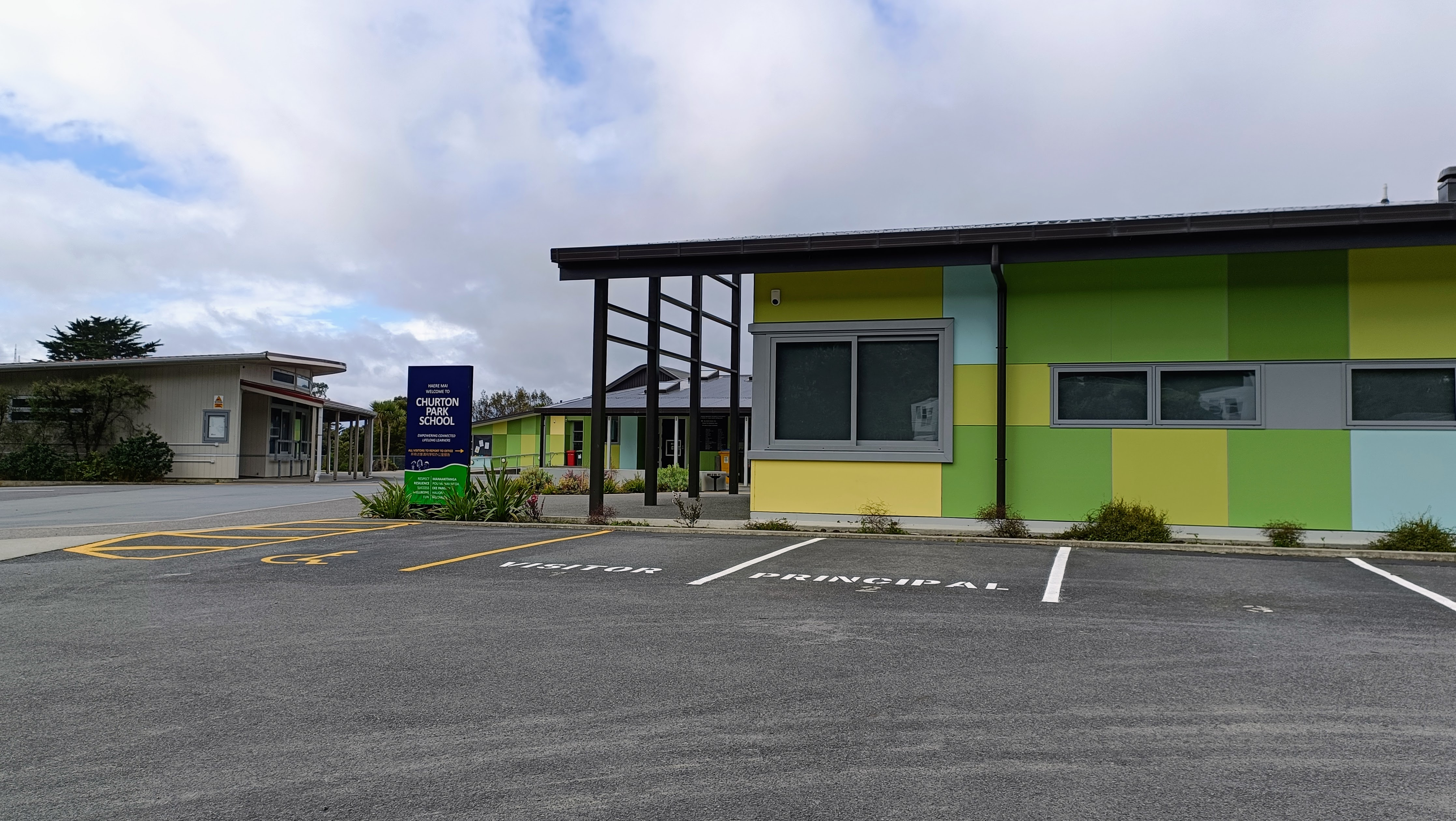
Churton Park School

=== School enrolment zones ===
Churton Park is within the enrolment zones for Onslow College, Newlands College, Newlands Intermediate, St Oran's College, Raroa Normal Intermediate, Amesbury School, and Churton Park School. Wellington College is also a popular school, however it is not in zone and any pupils will have to enter a ballot to be selected. There are two ballots: one for Year 9, and one for Year 10–13.

=== Primary schools ===
Churton Park has two state primary schools that cater for pupils up to Year 6.

Churton Park School on Churton Drive is an established school, with a roll of 312 as of July 2026. It opened in 1975. The roll has rapidly increased over the years. To accommodate these increases, there were many renovations to the buildings between 1997 and 2007. In 2006, and even more major renovations from 2019 to 2023, to help manage roll growth, the School Board proposed an amendment to the zoning policy/area. This was heatedly debated in the community as the proposal would have removed several long-standing streets from the Zone. The associated community concern, protest action and lobbying by the Campaign for Local Schooling and parent feedback resulted in the announcement by the Ministry of Education in 2007 that a new, larger, school site would be developed in the area. On 17 March 2009, Minister of Education Anne Tolley announced that a second primary school would be built in the area instead.

Amesbury School on Amesbury Drive opened at the start of 2012. It has a roll of 258 as of July 2026.. The Amesbury Hall at the school was opened in May 2012 by Wellington Mayor Celia Wade-Brown. The construction of the hall was funded in part by the proceeds from the sale of part of the school site (which was held as a Reserve) by WCC to the Ministry of Education. The Amesbury Hall is available for community use.

=== Preschools ===
There is a little school on Melksham Drive off Westchester Drive and Churton Park Kindergarten next to Churton Park School.

== Mining ==
There are historic gold mining shafts in the area. Tawa Flats All Luck Gold Mining Company shafts of 1881 included one now buried beneath Erlestoke Crescent.

== Public transport ==
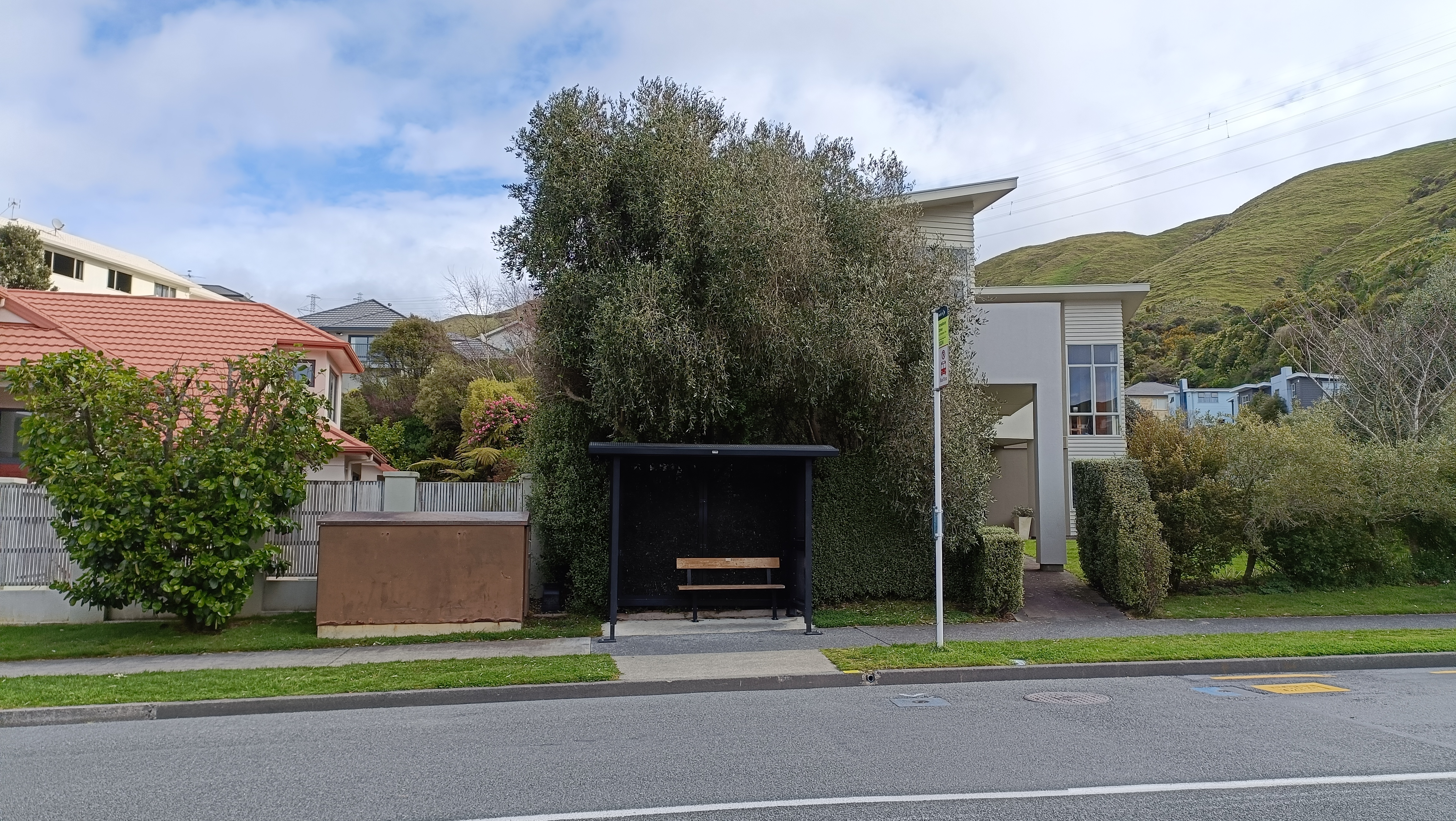
Bus stop in Churton Park

The suburb consists of two public routes, and multiple school routes operated by Metlink, a subsidiary under Tranzurban. The Route 1 connects Churton Park to Johnsonville, the city center, Newtown and Island Bay. The Route 19 acts as a Johnsonville loop. A separate service along Middleton Road connects Johnsonville to Tawa and Porirua.

There were plans for a train station in Churton Park, however, a 2017 report said that the proposed commuter railway station near Churton Park on the Kāpiti Line (and actually in Glenside) was too expensive.
