= Paparangi =

Suburb of Wellington City, New Zealand

- Suburb
- Interactive map of Paparangi
- Coordinates: 41°13′04″S 174°49′17″E
- Country: New Zealand
- City: Wellington City
- Local authority: Wellington City Council
- Electoral ward: Takapū/Northern Ward; Te Whanganui-a-Tara Māori Ward

Area
  - Land: 126 ha (310 acres)

Population (June 2025)
  - Total: 2,920
  - Density: 2,320/km^{2} (6,000/sq mi)
- Postcode: 6037

	Glenside, Grenada
Johnsonville	Paparangi	Woodridge
	Johnsonville	Newlands

Paparangi, one of the northern suburbs of Wellington in New Zealand, lies approximately 10 km north of the city centre, north-east of Johnsonville, north-west of Newlands and south of Grenada and Woodridge. The population was 2,841 at the time of the 2013 census, an increase of 96 from the 2006 census population.

The New Zealand Ministry for Culture and Heritage gives a translation of "flat sky" for the Māori language name Paparangi.

The suburb has a small local shopping-centre and a low-decile primary school.

The area, formerly in small farms and part of Newlands, became a dormitory suburb of Wellington, with major subdivisions in the early 1960s adding about a hundred houses a year. Beazley Homes of Tauranga (owned by Barry Beazley) was a major developer.

Some of the street names are the first names of children living in the area then or of children whose parents became involved in development of the suburb (Cara Crescent, Mark Avenue and Lynda Avenue take their names from children of Barry Beazley).

In 1991 a new landfill opened in Grenada, with direct access via an overbridge to the adjacent motorway. A road extension would give Newlands and Paparangi access to the motorway, but the Grenada Village Progressive Association expressed concerns about any increase in traffic and in car speeds. From 1994 the Wellington City Council consulted with residents, and in 2009 the Mayor opened the "Mark Avenue Extension" connecting the two areas.

== History ==
The area was settled by a farmer Thomas Drake from Devonshire who was a descendant of John Drake, brother to Sir Francis Drake. He obtained a Crown Grant of 332 acres of land in 1861. His widow Ceres Selina Drake sold the land to the Crown on 3 August 1897, and it was broken into small farms of the Paparangi Estate, as one of the Small Farms Settlements of Richard Seddon’s Liberal Government. Working men got a 2 hectare (5 acre) lease-in-perpetuity section on which they could grow fruit and vegetables and keep pigs, bees and fowls.

In the 1920s and 1930s there were five dairy farms in Newlands and Paparangi, supplying town milk to Wellington. Sam Styles had a 90-acre (36 ha) dairy farm, Ocean View Farm in Horokiwi Road, Paparangi supplying milk and cream. He was a Makara County Councillor, and later ran 200 sheep on 200 acres (80 ha) at the top of Horokiwi. The farm was sold to Mr McKinley after Styles' death in 1935.

== Demographics ==
Paparangi statistical area covers 1.26 km^{2} (0.49 sq mi). It had an estimated population of 2,920 as of June 2025, with a population density of 2,317 people per km^{2}.

Historical population
Year	Pop.	±% p.a.
2006	2,664	—
2013	2,514	−0.82%
2018	2,616	+0.80%
2023	2,781	+1.23%
The 2006 population is for a larger area of 1.31 km^{2}. Source:

Paparangi had a population of 2,781 in the 2023 New Zealand census, an increase of 165 people (6.3%) since the 2018 census, and an increase of 267 people (10.6%) since the 2013 census. There were 1,365 males, 1,401 females, and 21 people of other genders in 990 dwellings. 5.2% of people identified as LGBTIQ+. The median age was 36.3 years (compared with 38.1 years nationally). There were 513 people (18.4%) aged under 15 years, 531 (19.1%) aged 15 to 29, 1,425 (51.2%) aged 30 to 64, and 312 (11.2%) aged 65 or older.

People could identify as more than one ethnicity. The results were 62.5% European (Pākehā); 12.0% Māori; 6.8% Pasifika; 29.6% Asian; 2.7% Middle Eastern, Latin American and African New Zealanders (MELAA); and 2.6% other, which includes people giving their ethnicity as "New Zealander". English was spoken by 95.3%, Māori by 2.7%, Samoan by 1.6%, and other languages by 24.1%. No language could be spoken by 2.3% (e.g. too young to talk). New Zealand Sign Language was known by 0.5%. The percentage of people born overseas was 34.4, compared with 28.8% nationally.

Religious affiliations were 30.1% Christian, 5.8% Hindu, 2.3% Islam, 0.2% Māori religious beliefs, 2.4% Buddhist, 0.4% New Age, 0.2% Jewish, and 2.7% other religions. People who answered that they had no religion were 51.9%, and 4.5% of people did not answer the census question.

Of those at least 15 years old, 825 (36.4%) people had a bachelor's or higher degree, 1,011 (44.6%) had a post-high school certificate or diploma, and 426 (18.8%) people exclusively held high school qualifications. The median income was $55,600, compared with $41,500 nationally. 450 people (19.8%) earned over $100,000 compared to 12.1% nationally. The employment status of those at least 15 was 1,407 (62.0%) full-time, 282 (12.4%) part-time, and 42 (1.9%) unemployed.

== Education ==
Paparangi School is a co-educational state primary school for Year 1 to 6 students, with a roll of 232 as of July 2026. It opened in 1968.
