= Halfway House (Glenside, New Zealand) =

Historic building in Glenside, New Zealand

The Halfway House, Glenside
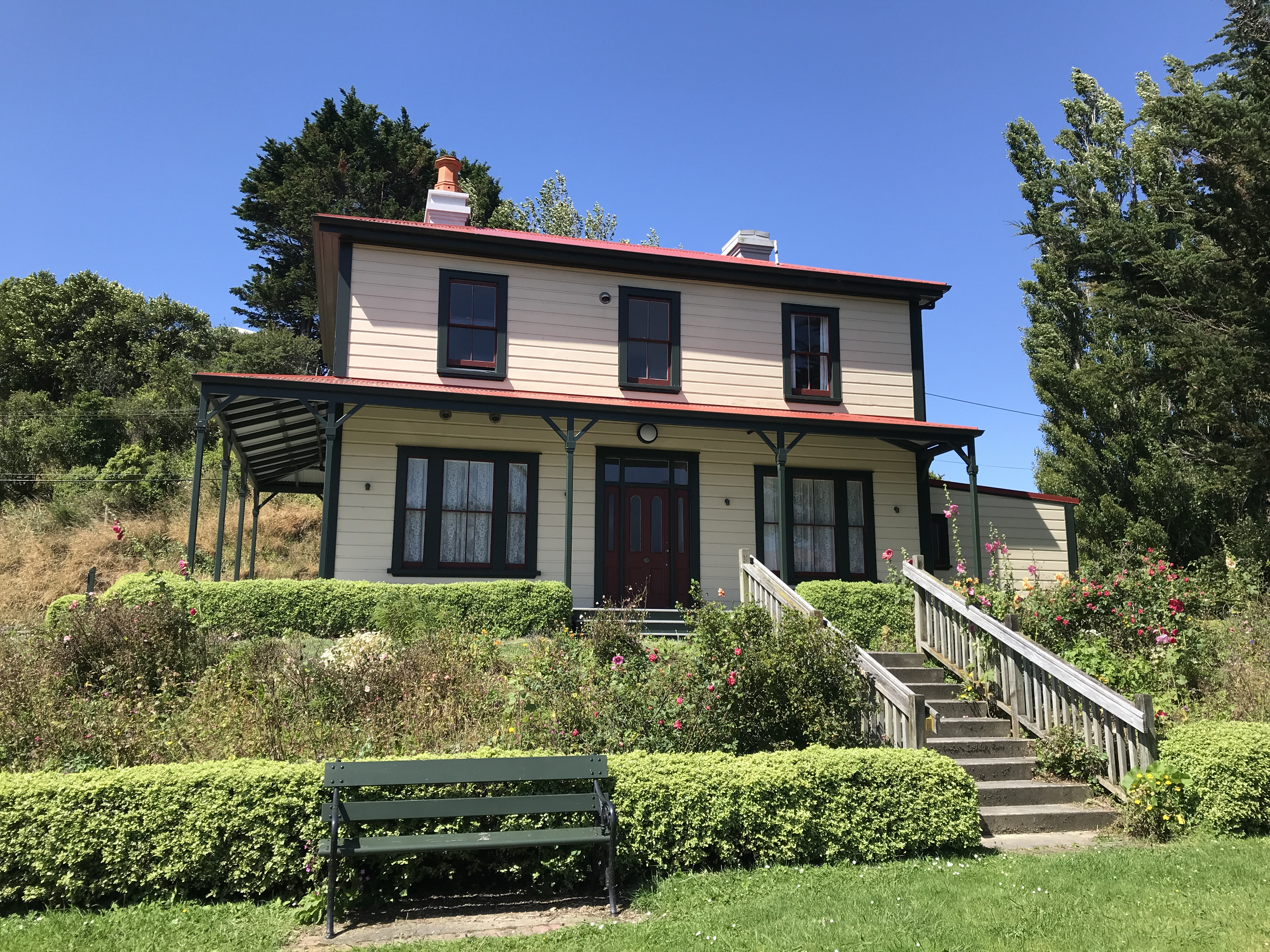
- Interactive map of the The Halfway House, Glenside area

General information
- Type: House
- Location: Glenside, New Zealand
- Coordinates: 41°12′21″S 174°48′47″E
- Completed: 1880

The Halfway House is a is an historic building and accommodation house in Glenside, New Zealand. It is located in the Glenside Recreation Reserve.

The first Halfway house in Glenside was built in 1841 by Anthony and Susannah Wall. At the time, the house was the only structure located on their road, which served as the main connector between the towns of Wellington and Porirua. Martha King did a drawing of the house in 1849. The Walls likely moved out of the Halfway House in the 1850s, moving further north. The original Halfway House was destroyed by a fire in 1891, and its location remains unknown.

Around 1880, a new house, also known as the Halfway House, was built.

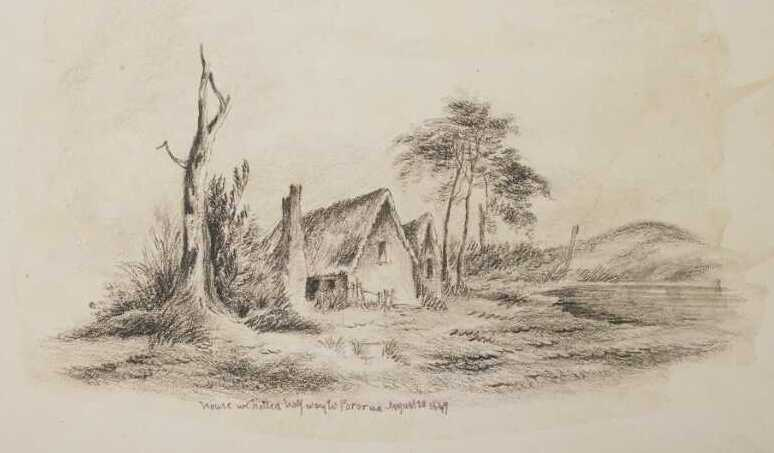
The Halfway House, Glenside 1849 by Martha King.
