= Grenada North =

Suburb of Wellington City, New Zealand

- Suburb
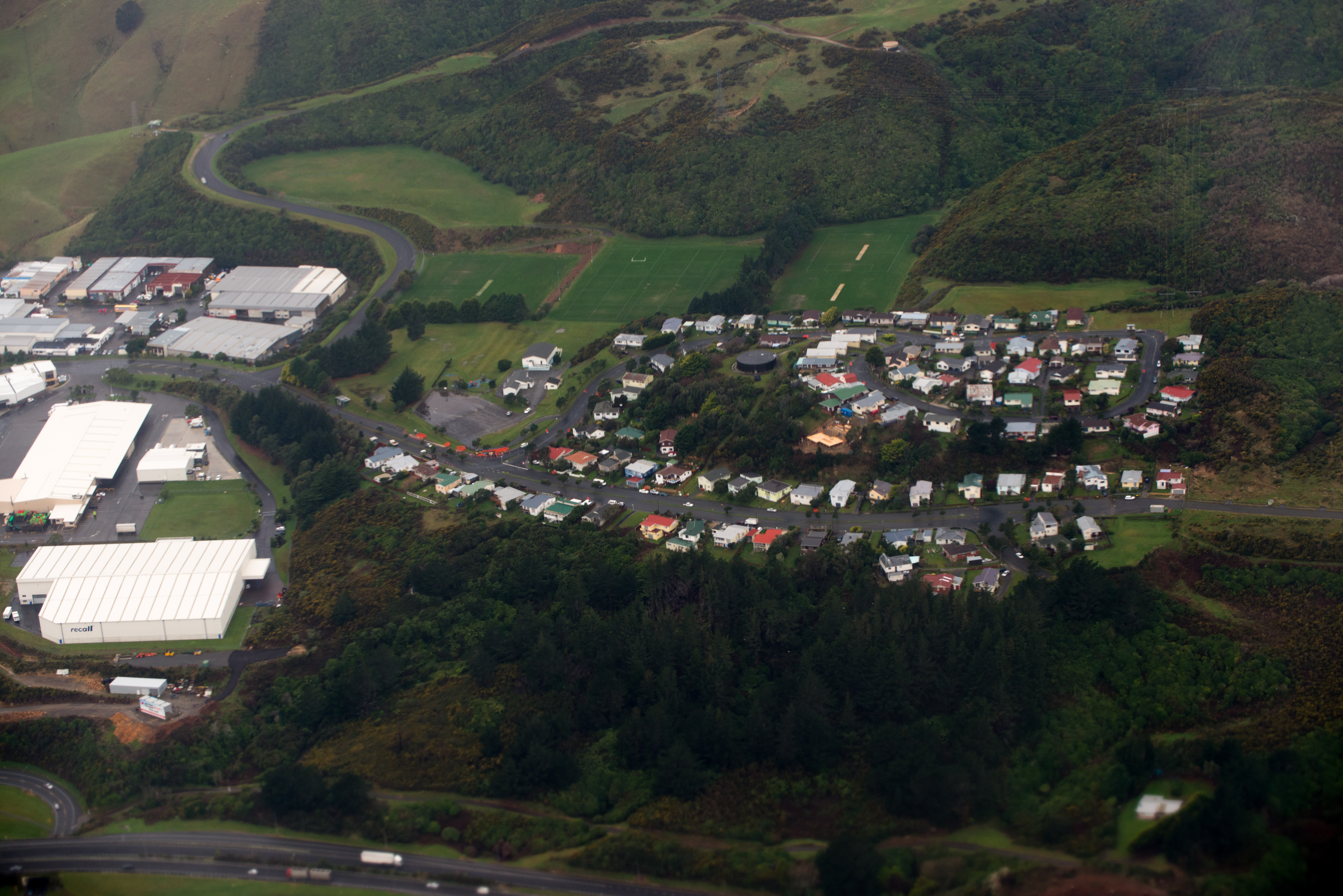
- Aerial view of residential area in Grenada North, Wellington, New Zealand.
- Interactive map of Grenada North
- Coordinates: 41°11′28″S 174°50′44″E
- Country: New Zealand
- City: Wellington
- Local authority: Wellington City Council
- Electoral ward: Takapū/Northern Ward; Te Whanganui-a-Tara Māori Ward
- Community board: Tawa Community Board

Area
  - Land: 579 ha (1,430 acres)

Population (June 2025)
  - Total: 2,590
  - Density: 447/km^{2} (1,160/sq mi)
- Postcode: 5028

| Tawa | Takapu Valley |
| | Grenada North | Horokiwi |
| Glenside | Grenada Village |

Grenada North is a small suburb in northern Wellington, New Zealand. It is 5 km south of Porirua's city centre, and 13 km north of Wellington's city centre. Its western boundary is formed by State Highway 1 (SH 1N) and Takapu Road. The suburb itself was named after Grenada in the Caribbean, and most streets are named after Caribbean islands.

The Caribbean Avenue Reserve can be accessed from Caribbean Drive.

== History ==
The suburb was developed by Glendene Developments Ltd in the 1970s so was originally called Glendene, and was expected to join up soon with the suburb of Grenada further south. To meet increased education demand in the Northern suburbs a new Glendene Secondary School was proposed, but by 1980 it was decided that a new co-ed secondary school was not needed and may never be needed. The 14.5-hectare (36-acre) site with sports fields in Jamaica Drive developed by the government was leased to the Wellington City Council for use as playing fields, and was later (c1989) sold to the council. The residential area south towards Grenada is only now (c2015) being developed.

== Demographics ==
Grenada North statistical area covers 5.79 km^{2} (2.24 sq mi). It had an estimated population of 2,590 as of June 2025, with a population density of 447 people per km^{2}.

Historical population
| Year | Pop. | ±% p.a. |
|---|---|---|
| 2006 | 2,007 | — |
| 2013 | 2,163 | +1.08% |
| 2018 | 2,286 | +1.11% |
| 2023 | 2,475 | +1.60% |

Grenada North had a population of 2,475 in the 2023 New Zealand census, an increase of 189 people (8.3%) since the 2018 census, and an increase of 312 people (14.4%) since the 2013 census. There were 1,227 males, 1,242 females, and 9 people of other genders in 780 dwellings. 3.9% of people identified as LGBTIQ+. The median age was 37.2 years (compared with 38.1 years nationally). There were 498 people (20.1%) aged under 15 years, 507 (20.5%) aged 15 to 29, 1,185 (47.9%) aged 30 to 64, and 288 (11.6%) aged 65 or older.

People could identify as more than one ethnicity. The results were 66.9% European (Pākehā); 11.4% Māori; 8.8% Pasifika; 22.8% Asian; 1.5% Middle Eastern, Latin American and African New Zealanders (MELAA); and 3.4% other, which includes people giving their ethnicity as "New Zealander". English was spoken by 95.2%, Māori by 4.0%, Samoan by 1.6%, and other languages by 21.0%. No language could be spoken by 2.5% (e.g. too young to talk). New Zealand Sign Language was known by 0.5%. The percentage of people born overseas was 29.2, compared with 28.8% nationally.

Religious affiliations were 32.4% Christian, 5.6% Hindu, 2.4% Islam, 0.7% Māori religious beliefs, 2.4% Buddhist, 0.1% New Age, 0.4% Jewish, and 1.7% other religions. People who answered that they had no religion were 49.9%, and 4.6% of people did not answer the census question.

Of those at least 15 years old, 624 (31.6%) people had a bachelor's or higher degree, 1,014 (51.3%) had a post-high school certificate or diploma, and 336 (17.0%) people exclusively held high school qualifications. The median income was $56,800, compared with $41,500 nationally. 480 people (24.3%) earned over $100,000 compared to 12.1% nationally. The employment status of those at least 15 was 1,170 (59.2%) full-time, 288 (14.6%) part-time, and 45 (2.3%) unemployed.

== Aerial view ==
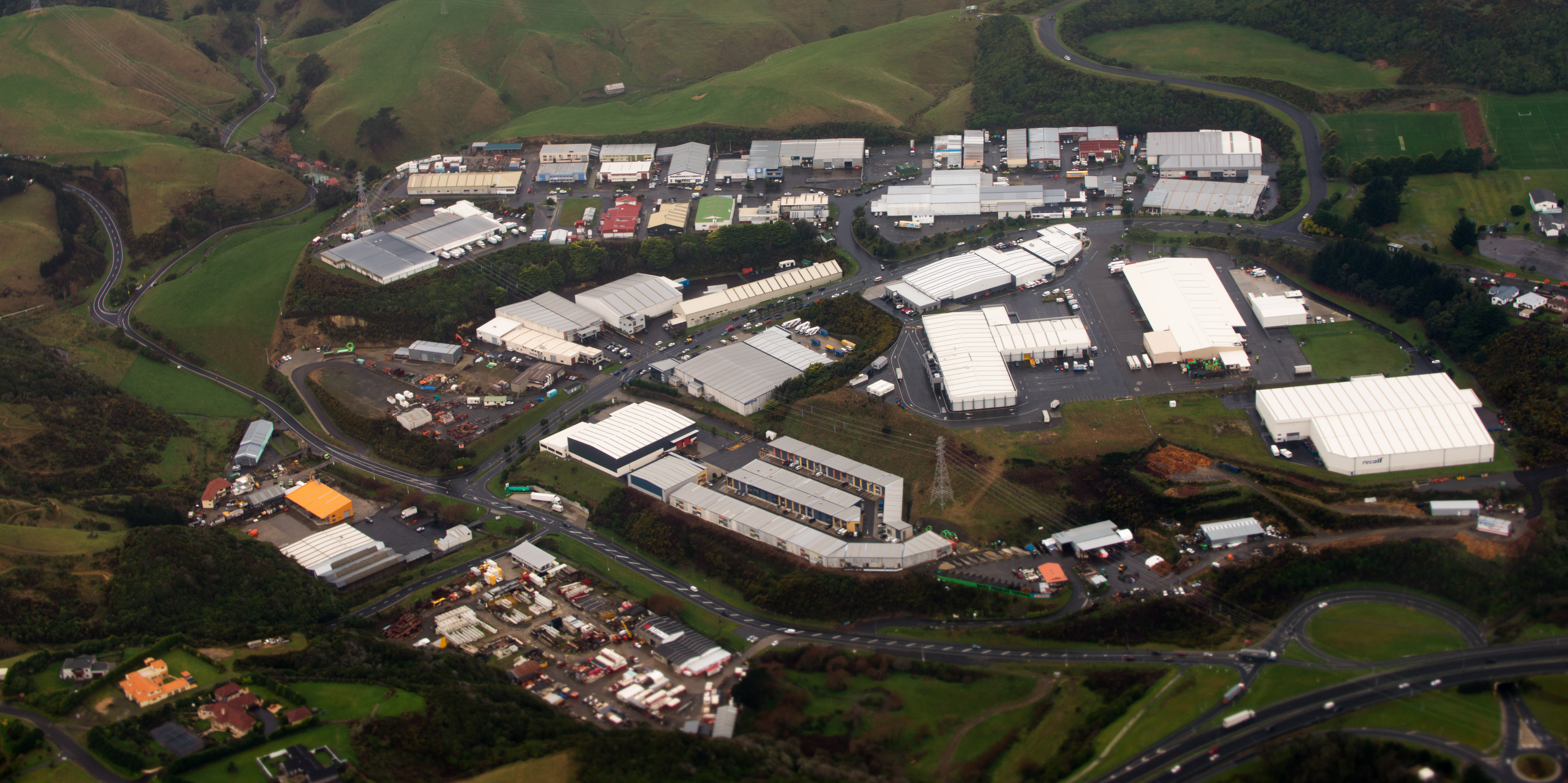
Commercial and industrial part of Grenada North, in northwest corner, facing southeast

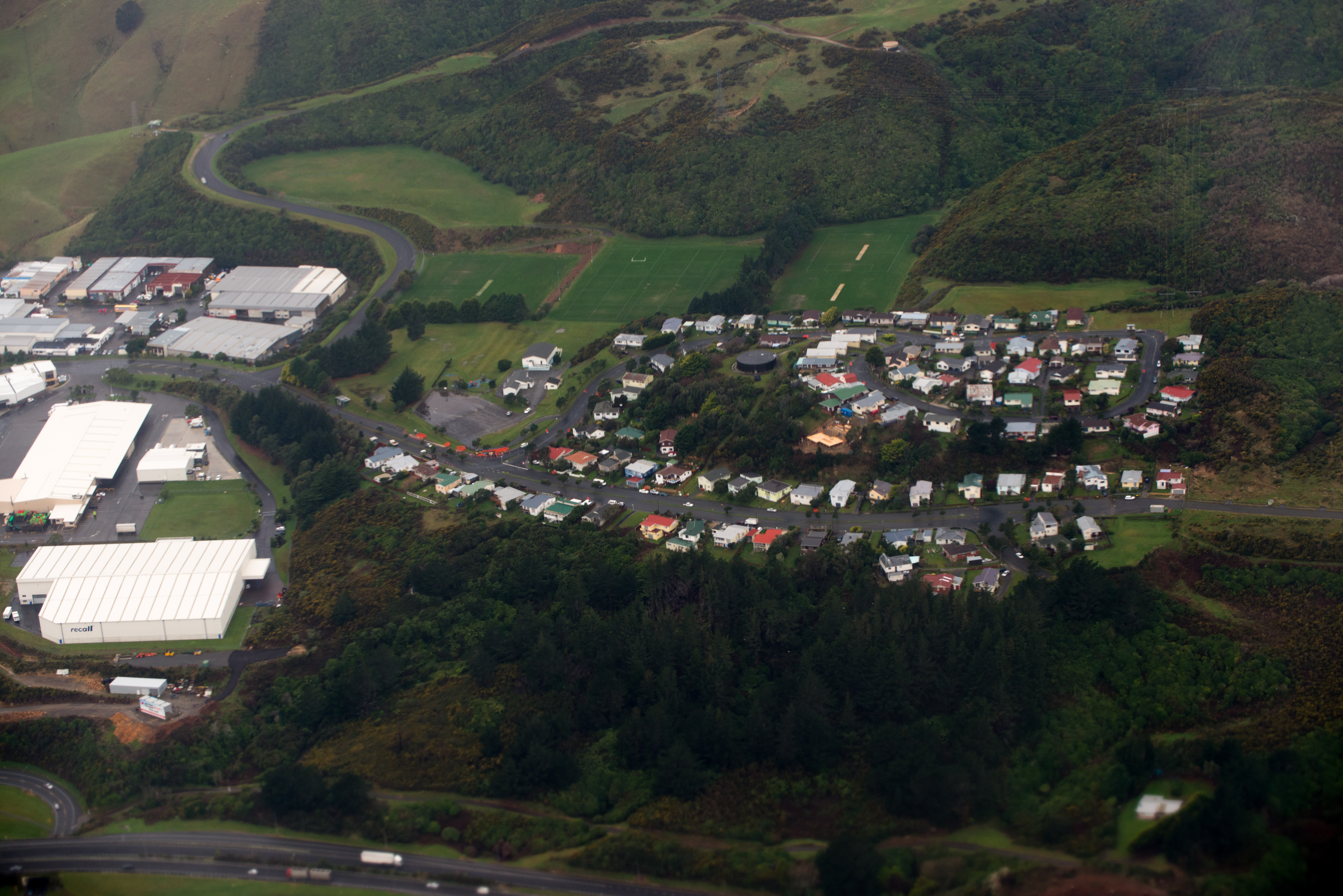
Residential part of Grenada North, just south of commercial/industrial part, facing east
