= Takapu Valley =

Suburb of Wellington City, New Zealand

- Suburb
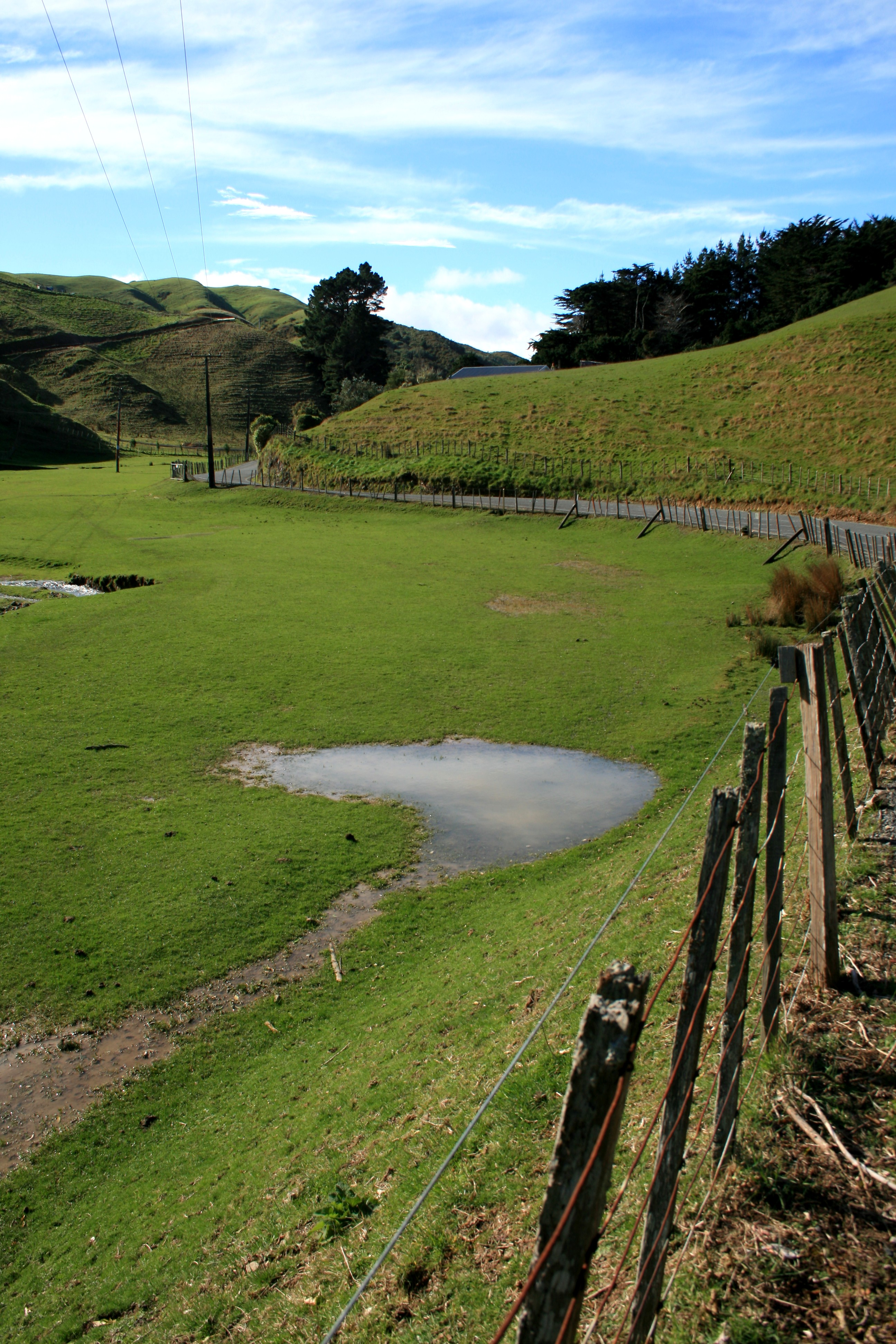
- Takapu Valley looking NE on a clear winters afternoon
- Interactive map of Takapu Valley
- Coordinates: 41°09′50″S 174°51′22″E
- Country: New Zealand
- City: Wellington
- Local authority: Wellington City Council
- Electoral ward: Takapū/Northern Ward; Te Whanganui-a-Tara Māori Ward
- Community board: Tawa Community Board

Area
  - Land: 1,177 ha (2,910 acres)

Population (2023 census)
  - Total: 81
  - Density: 6.9/km^{2} (18/sq mi)
- Postcode: 5028
- Train stations: Takapu Road railway station

	Ranui Heights, Cannons Creek
Tawa	Takapu Valley	Belmont
	Grenada North, Horokiwi

Takapu Valley, one of the northern suburbs of Wellington, New Zealand, is a rural area. The only road, Takapu Road, which runs by the Takapu Stream, goes down past Grenada North to the intersection with the Johnsonville-Porirua Motorway, and to Tawa where most facilities are. There is a supermarket and the Takapu Road railway station near the motorway intersection, but neither is in the valley itself.

== History ==
The valley was settled in the 19th century, when country sections were sold by the New Zealand Company, many to absentee landowners. An early farmer was John Edwards who arrived in Wellington on the ‘’Catherine Stewart Forbes’’with his wife Phoebe and eight children in 1841. Three of their sons Edward, Thomas and William farmed in the valley.

Access was via the Old Porirua Road which passed the entrance to Takapu Valley.

The Takapu Road School operated from the 1890s to the 1920s.

James and Lionel Nairn transferred their dairy herd to Takapu Road in the 1920s, as in Khandallah (and Ngaio) houses were replacing the remaining farms.

In 2017 the Woodman Farm in Takapu Valley which had been in the same family for 150 years was up for sale.

== Demographics ==
=== Takapu Valley ===
Takapu Valley has an area of 11.77 km^{2} (4.54 sq mi) It is part of the larger Takapu-Horokiwi statistical area.

Historical population for Takapu Valley
Year	Pop.	±% p.a.
2006	84	—
2013	72	−2.18%
2018	87	+3.86%
2023	81	−1.42%

Takapu Valley had a population of 81 in the 2023 New Zealand census, a decrease of 6 people (−6.9%) since the 2018 census, and an increase of 9 people (12.5%) since the 2013 census. There were 42 males and 39 females in 30 dwellings. 3.7% of people identified as LGBTIQ+. The median age was 49.8 years (compared with 38.1 years nationally). There were 12 people (14.8%) aged under 15 years, 12 (14.8%) aged 15 to 29, 51 (63.0%) aged 30 to 64, and 6 (7.4%) aged 65 or older.

People could identify as more than one ethnicity. The results were 88.9% European (Pākehā); 3.7% Māori; 3.7% Asian; 3.7% Middle Eastern, Latin American and African New Zealanders (MELAA); and 7.4% other, which includes people giving their ethnicity as "New Zealander". English was spoken by 100.0%, Māori by 3.7%, and other languages by 7.4%. The percentage of people born overseas was 29.6, compared with 28.8% nationally.

Religious affiliations were 33.3% Christian, and 3.7% other religions. People who answered that they had no religion were 51.9%, and 7.4% of people did not answer the census question.

Of those at least 15 years old, 18 (26.1%) people had a bachelor's or higher degree, 42 (60.9%) had a post-high school certificate or diploma, and 6 (8.7%) people exclusively held high school qualifications. The median income was $54,600, compared with $41,500 nationally. 15 people (21.7%) earned over $100,000 compared to 12.1% nationally. The employment status of those at least 15 was 51 (73.9%) full-time and 6 (8.7%) part-time.

=== Takapu-Horokiwi ===
Takapu-Horokiwi statistical area includes Horokiwi and covers 19.10 km^{2} (7.37 sq mi). It had an estimated population of 260 as of June 2025, with a population density of 14 people per km^{2}.

Historical population for Takapu-Horokiwi
Year	Pop.	±% p.a.
2006	258	—
2013	246	−0.68%
2018	273	+2.10%
2023	264	−0.67%

Takapu-Horokiwi had a population of 264 in the 2023 New Zealand census, a decrease of 9 people (−3.3%) since the 2018 census, and an increase of 18 people (7.3%) since the 2013 census. There were 141 males and 120 females in 102 dwellings. 3.4% of people identified as LGBTIQ+. The median age was 50.6 years (compared with 38.1 years nationally). There were 42 people (15.9%) aged under 15 years, 30 (11.4%) aged 15 to 29, 156 (59.1%) aged 30 to 64, and 33 (12.5%) aged 65 or older.

People could identify as more than one ethnicity. The results were 87.5% European (Pākehā); 8.0% Māori; 8.0% Asian; 3.4% Middle Eastern, Latin American and African New Zealanders (MELAA); and 2.3% other, which includes people giving their ethnicity as "New Zealander". English was spoken by 98.9%, Māori by 2.3%, and other languages by 17.0%. No language could be spoken by 1.1% (e.g. too young to talk). The percentage of people born overseas was 26.1, compared with 28.8% nationally.

Religious affiliations were 27.3% Christian, 1.1% Hindu, 2.3% Islam, 1.1% Buddhist, 1.1% New Age, and 1.1% other religions. People who answered that they had no religion were 59.1%, and 8.0% of people did not answer the census question.

Of those at least 15 years old, 72 (32.4%) people had a bachelor's or higher degree, 117 (52.7%) had a post-high school certificate or diploma, and 33 (14.9%) people exclusively held high school qualifications. The median income was $63,400, compared with $41,500 nationally. 66 people (29.7%) earned over $100,000 compared to 12.1% nationally. The employment status of those at least 15 was 150 (67.6%) full-time, 24 (10.8%) part-time, and 6 (2.7%) unemployed.
