= Newlands College =

Location
- 68 Bracken Road; Newlands; Wellington 6037; New Zealand; 41°13′5.59″S 174°49′25.83″E

Information
- Type: State secondary co-educational Years 9–13
- Motto: Me Whakamātau "We Work Hard To Achieve Together"
- Established: February 1970
- Ministry of Education Institution no.: 268
- Principal: Deb King
- Enrolment: 1,235 (July 2026)
- Socio-economic decile: 9
- Website: www.newlands.school.nz

Newlands College is a state coeducational secondary school located in the Wellington, New Zealand, suburb of Newlands. Opened in February 1970, the school has a roll of 1,235 students as of July 2026.

The current principal is Deb King. The school colours are white, red and blue. The school offers several art, sport and recreation options, along with each student belonging to a house.

== History ==
Newlands College opened on 3 February 1970 with a starting school roll of 68 students. The land had been owned at different times by the Hogg, Moore and Tunley families, and had been farmed by Bill Hunter. The foundation principal was Rex Sage, who was also the foundation deputy principal of Tawa College, followed by Paul Richardson and, since 2002, Grant Jones who had been a deputy principal and geography teacher at Orewa College in Auckland. However, the school was not complete yet, with the site land causing problems. The first term classes took place in two classrooms at Raroa Normal Intermediate School (which was being built at the same time). The site itself was finished by April, and on 27 April 1970, students and staff shifted to the modern day Newlands College site at Bracken Road. A- block, the first and only permanent building was unfinished at the time. The hall was finished in 1973, and the Recreation Centre in 1985.

In later years, a fully equipped gymnasium with squash courts, a mezzanine classroom and a multi-function room was built co-funded by the local community, a new permanent B- block was added, several pre-fabricated buildings were installed, and a technology and learning support suite were built. Since 2000, Newlands College has also refurbished the library, media and administration areas, built a sports pavilion, a languages block, and a wharekura dedicated to the study of Te Reo and Te Ao Maori. In coordination with neighbouring Newlands Intermediate School, Newlands College has also added artificial turf to several of its outdoor sports surfaces and has announced further expansion and re-modelling plans as a result of a growing roll (with additional pre-fabricated buildings to be installed) and improved weather tightness for some of the buildings housing the administration and staff facilities. The school previously offered community education to adults, although this service has ceased and is no longer listed on their website.

== Campus ==
The language and visual art block

Newlands College of the Nelson 2H design, like most New Zealand state secondary schools built between 1960 and 1970. The Nelson 2H is distinguished by its two-storey H-shaped classroom blocks, with stairwells at each end of the block and a large ground floor toilet and cloak area on one side. The college has two of these blocks: A block and B block.

Throughout the years, the college has grown substantially, having 1000 students in 2010. B block was built with similar architecture to A block. C block was substantially smaller, with only two classrooms and a storage room, however as of May 2023, the original C block has been demolished as part of long term building plans; there is a temporary C block consisting of four prefab classrooms.

H block had the school hall and a classroom primarily for drama, however, this has been demolished as part of the school's building plan, with only the school hall and foyer remaining. A new neighbouring senior leadership team corridor and office was later established. As of 2023, a new staffroom, containing the dean's office and guidance counselors, was opened in place of the old drama classrooms. A new senior leadership team corridor and office was later established.

D block was also built to accommodate the learning support programme. However, in 2009, the building was demolished and rebuilt, while being renamed to the Learning Support Centre. L Block was built in 2006 for languages and visual arts. The Te Ao Marama is a Whare Kura, primarily for teaching Maori and hosting meetings. There is a large P.E. department building, hosting the largest gymnasium in North Wellington, a mezzanine classroom, a room for meetings and drama performances (formerly the cafeteria), and a cafeteria. The college also has a large administration area and staffroom. There is a pavilion that overlooks the sports fields for classes, meetings and seating for sports events.

As part of the school building programme, working to accommodate school roll growth, the recently refurbished library and part of A block was demolished after the discovery of asbestos. The library has been relocated to the L block since 2022, with languages (excl. Maori) being relocated to the pavilion. There has been a new prefab classroom installed in the quad to accommodate for roll growth.

== Ethnic composition ==
The New Zealand Education Review Office (ERO) provided the following statistics for the month June 2010: European 47%, Asian 23%, Māori 12%, Pasifika 5%, Other 13%. On the International Languages Week of 2009, it was reported that the school was composed of 42 different backgrounds.

== Houses ==
The school has four houses, which form classes are assigned to. They are Kowhai, Matai, Rimu, and Totara which are named after native New Zealand trees. Each house can earn points in inter-house events such as the annual Tabloids sports day, and the House that has accumulated the highest number of points is awarded the Inter-house Cup at the end of the year. The house emblems are placed in order from left to right (first to fourth place) in the school hall for the current status of the standings. Each Tabloids sports day is generally on the last Friday of February.

In 2024, each House decided to create new emblems and flags to brand each house. Flags are planned to be voted on for each house during the third term of the school year, while each emblem was decided beforehand.

Name of House	Colour	Tree	Emblem	Flag
Kōwhai	Yellow	Sophora microphylla		TBD
Mataī	Blue	Prumnopitys taxifolia		TBD
Rimu	Red	Dacrydium cupressinum		TBD
Tōtara	Green	Podocarpus totara		TBD

== Arts ==
The school annual Variety Show consists of a variety of performances (as the name suggests) such as Kapa haka, solo singing and drama performances. Almost every year, the school is involved in a production which students and teachers alike can sign up for. Examples are Guys and Dolls (2007), Les Misérables (2009), Grease (2010), The Wizard of Oz (2013), Spamalot (2014), All Shook Up (2015), Hairspray (2016), Rock of Ages (2017), Catch Me If You Can (2018), and Beauty and the Beast (2019). Along with the school production, the Year 12 and 13 Drama classes must produce a production separately. The school also partakes in a competition known as the Sheilah Winn Shakespeare Competition. The senior school balls for year 12 and 13 happens in June and the Semi formal for year 11s happens in September.

The school has a building specifically for the Visual Arts and languages, the Language and Art Block. This was available at the start of 2006. The school also has a Whare Kura which was named the Te Ao Marama. This was opened on 10 May 2007.

Each year, Media Studies classes participate in the production of short films. These short films are edited with Final Cut Pro X and the most appropriate (with Excellence or high Merit marks) are submitted for the NOSCARS (the Newlands College Oscars) after being classified by the OFLC. If the Office gives a restricted rating, it cannot be screened at the NOSCARS. The NOSCARS were previously held at the Wellington Paramount Theatre and are now held at the Embassy Theatre. The NOSCARS are now held annually, with awards available for viewers choice, overall best and other filmmaking categories.

== Sport ==
Newlands offers a wide range of sporting options to its pupils, 22 in total, with summer, winter and all-year-round sports. Sports that are available include badminton, cricket, soccer, hockey, golf, rugby, netball, orienteering, smallbore rifle shooting, softball, squash, and underwater hockey. The uniform code for sport is also present, with most sports needing standard Newlands College P.E. gear.

In 2010, the Newlands College Boys' softball team won the National Secondary School Softball Championships without conceding a defeat.

In 2015, the Newlands College Boys' basketball team reached the finals of the College Sport Wellington Pohlen Cup. The team ended up being defeated by Onslow College 78–65.

Newlands College has presence annually at the National School Orienteering Championship, although the future for its participation seems uncertain with head coach Andrew Riddle taking leave as of 2024.

== Recreation ==
The 2009 Peer Support camp

The school has an annual Peer Support camp at El Rancho (Waikanae Christian holiday park), which was first held in 1975. The camp is for newcomers to the school, along with final year students. Students are involved in a variety of activities including kayaking, rock climbing, go karts, and team initiative activities. Peer support training is held for year 12s after the NCEA examinations, and the actual camp is held in early February, usually near Waitangi Day. The annual tradition however, was broken for the first time in 2011, but resumed in 2012.

Other camps include the year 12 and 13 Geography trips to the St. Arnaud/Lake Rotoiti region and Tongariro National Park.

=== Recreation Centre ===
The Recreation Centre was founded as the Newlands Recreation Centre for the community, as a joint venture between Newlands College and the Wellington City Council. The school now has full ownership over it. The facility contains a gymnasium, one set of male and female changing rooms, a large foyer area, P.E equipment sheds, a reception area, P.E department offices, a kitchen, squash courts (known as the GFIT, used to teach junior PE classes) and a classroom.

== Notable alumni ==
- Te Amo Amaru-Tibble – netball and basketball player
- Jodi Brown – netball player
- Phil Burrows – field hockey player
- Vaughan Coveny – association football player
- Jenny Duck – field hockey player
- Jake Gleeson – association football player
- Nick Grigg – rugby union player
- Kyle Pontifex – field hockey player
- Michel Tuffery – artist
- Ross Verry – cricketer
- Luke Woodcock – cricketer
