= Wellington City Council =

Territorial authority in the Wellington urban area of New Zealand

Coordinates: 41°17′44″S 174°46′50″E

Wellington City Council Te Kaunihera o Pōneke
- Coat of arms

- Brand logo

Type
- Type: Territorial authority of Wellington
- Term limits: None

History
- Established: 1 November 1989; 36 years ago
- Preceded by: Wellington City Council; Tawa Borough Council
- New session started: 17 October 2025

Leadership
- Mayor: Andrew Little, Labour since 17 October 2025
- Deputy: Ben McNulty, Labour since 29 October 2025
- CEO: Matt Prosser since 5 December 2024

Structure
- Seats: 16 (including mayor)
- Political groups: Labour (6); Independent (5); Green (4); Independent Together (1)

Elections
- Voting system: Single transferable vote
- First election: 14 October 1989
- Last election: 11 October 2025
- Next election: 14 October 2028

Motto
- Suprema a situ

Meeting place
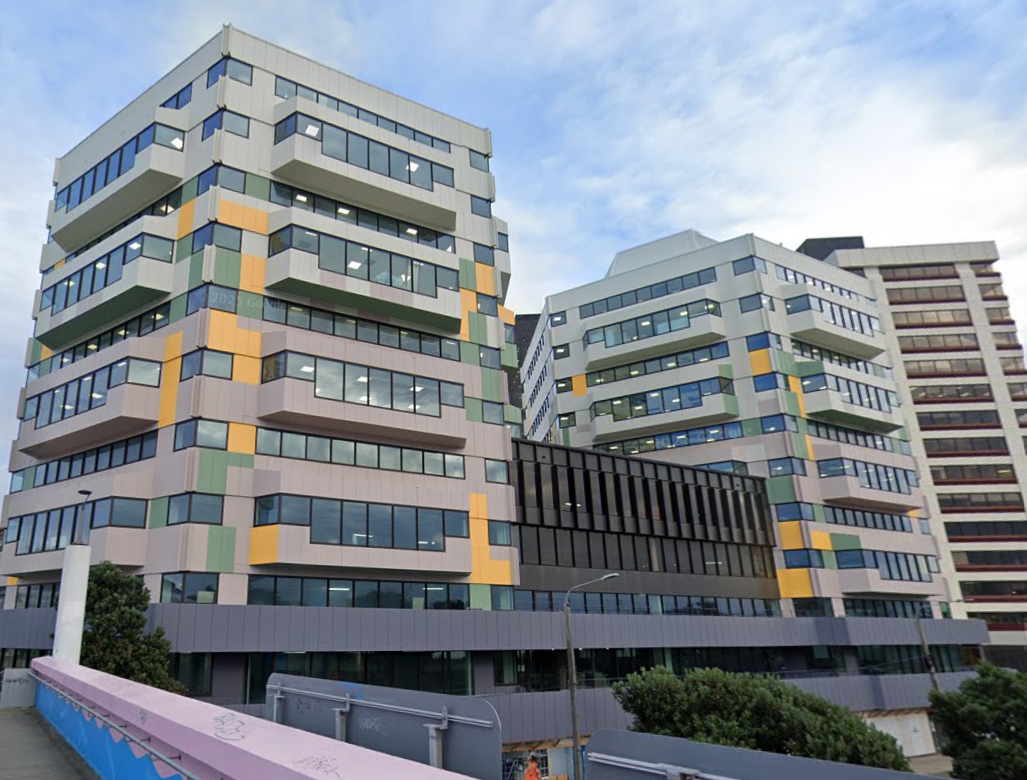
- 2 Harris Street

Website
- wellington.govt.nz/

Wellington City Council (abbr. WCC; Māori: Te Kaunihera o Pōneke) is the territorial authority for the city of Wellington, New Zealand (the country's capital). It serves as the city's local government alongside the Greater Wellington Regional Council as the regional council.

A city council for the city was first formed in 1870, replacing the former town board which had existed since 1863. Following the 1989 reforms to local government, that city council was dissolved and the current authority was established under the same name.

The governing body of the council has 15 councillors and is chaired by the mayor of Wellington (currently Andrew Little since October 2025). There are also two community boards.

== History ==
=== Predecessors ===
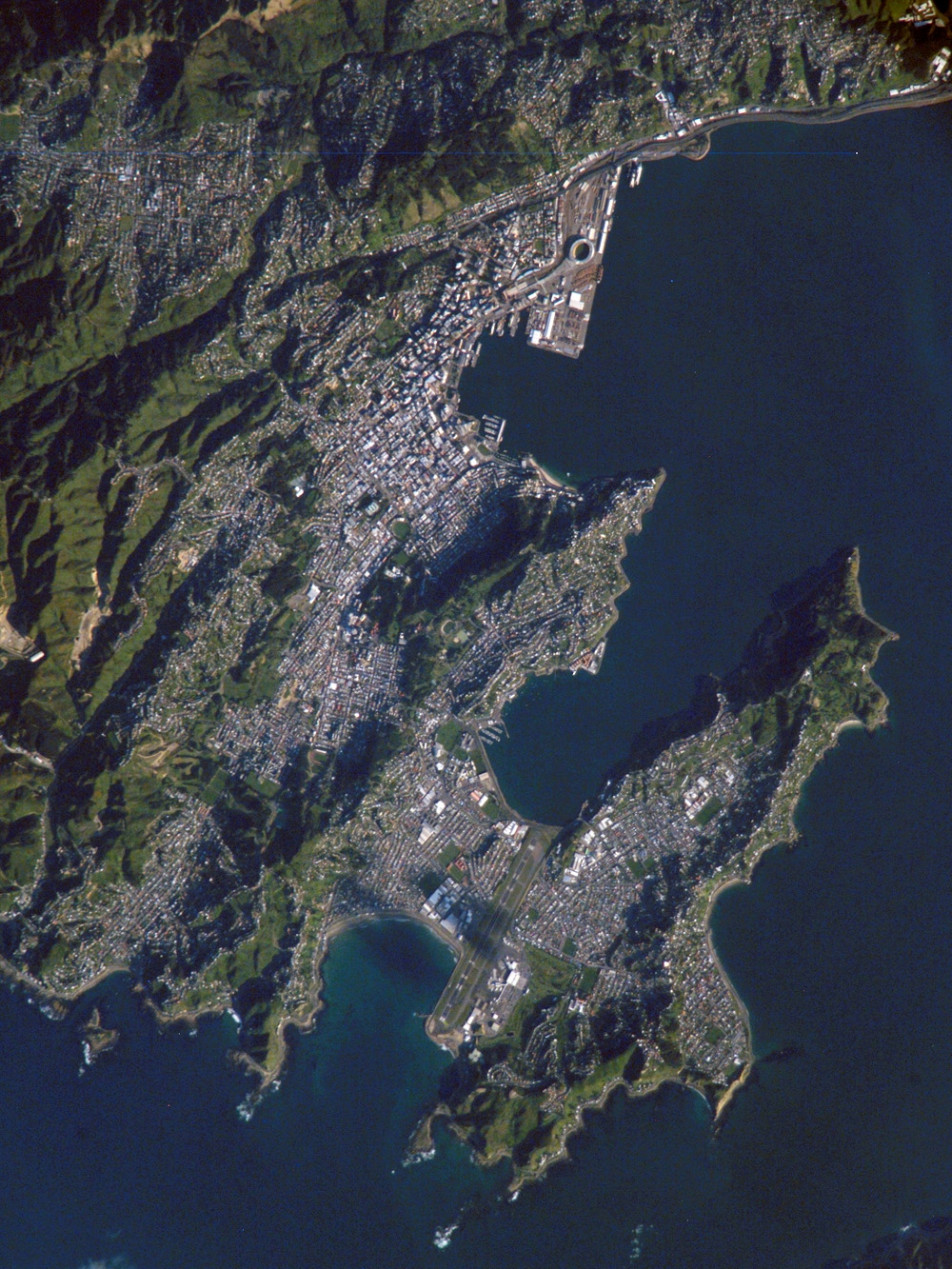
Satellite photo of central Wellington (south at bottom left)

In 1870, the Wellington City Corporation was formed, with former town board chairman Joe Dransfield being elected as its mayor. Wellington formally attained city status in 1881 when its non-Māori population surpassed 20,000. The Municipal Corporations Act 1886 further ratified Wellington's status as a city, alongside Auckland, Dunedin, Christchurch and Nelson, retroactively recognising it to have been such since 16 September 1870.

The City of Wellington has subsumed many neighbouring boroughs including:

- Melrose (established 1888) in 1903
- Onslow (Khandallah/Ngaio) (established 1890) in 1919 (Wadestown had joined the city in 1906)
- Karori (established 1891) in 1920
- Miramar (established 1904) in 1921
- Johnsonville (a Town Board from 1908), in 1953
- Tawa (a Town district from 1951, then the Tawa Flat Borough Council from 1953) in 1989

=== Crown observer ===
On 22 October 2024 the New Zealand government appointed Lindsay McKenzie as a Crown Observer to the council after the Council was forced to revise its 2023–2024 Long Term Plan in response to a failed attempt to sell its airport shares. MP and former Wellington City councillor Tamatha Paul accused the government of being politically motivated in their decision to appoint the Crown Observer.

== Governing body ==
=== Mayor ===
One mayor is elected at large from the entire Wellington City district.

=== Current composition ===
As of October 2026, the members of the governing body of council are:

Role	Portrait	Name	Affiliation	First elected	Ward
Mayor		Andrew Little	Labour	2025	Elected at-large
Deputy		Ben McNulty	Labour	2022	Takapū/Northern
Councillor		Greg O'Connor	Independent	2026 (Note: Sworn in on 22 October 2026, having been elected in a by-election following the death of councillor Tony Randle in August 2026.)	Takapū/Northern
Councillor		Andrea Compton	Independent	2025	Takapū/Northern
Councillor		Diane Calvert	Independent	2016	Wharangi/Onslow-Western
Councillor		Rebecca Matthews	Green	2019	Wharangi/Onslow-Western
Councillor		Ray Chung	Independent Together	2022	Wharangi/Onslow-Western
Councillor		Geordie Rogers	Green	2024	Pukehīnau/Lambton
Councillor		Afnan Al-Rubayee	Labour	2025	Pukehīnau/Lambton
Councillor		Nicola Young	Independent	2013	Pukehīnau/Lambton
Councillor		Karl Tiefenbacher	Independent	2025	Motukairangi/Eastern
Councillor		Sam O'Brien	Labour	2025	Motukairangi/Eastern
Councillor		Jonny Osborne	Green	2025	Motukairangi/Eastern
Councillor		Nureddin Abdurahman	Labour	2022	Paekawakawa/Southern
Councillor		Laurie Foon	Green	2019	Paekawakawa/Southern
Councillor		Matthew Reweti	Labour	2025	Te Whanganui-a-Tara Māori

== Committees ==
Following a review in 2021 by former Local Government New Zealand chief executive Peter Winder, the council adopted a new committee structure. All committees apart from Te Kaunihera o Pōneke Council and Unaunahi Ngaio Chief Executive Performance Review Committee include two mana whenua representatives (pouiwi), who are paid and have voting rights.

Committees and subcommittees of the Wellington City Council
Committee	Chair	Deputy Chair	Membership
Committees
Te Hoe Matua – City Strategy and Delivery	Cr Abdurahman	Cr Compton	Mayor, all councillors, both pouiwi
Te Taurapa – Council Planning and Finance	Cr Calvert	Cr O’Brien	Mayor, all councillors, both pouiwi
Te Rauawa – Social, Cultural, and Environment	Cr Foon	Cr Al-Rubayee	Mayor, all councillors, both pouiwi
Te Takere – Regulatory Processes	Cr Rogers	Cr Abdurahman	Mayor Little, Cr Calvert, Cr Tiefenbacher, Cr Reweti, Cr Matthews, Cr O’Brien, Cr O’Connor, PI Hohaia
Te Kura o te Waka – Audit and Risk	Paul Connell	Cr Matthews	Mayor Little, Cr Osborne, Cr Reweti, Cr Chung, Cr O’Brien, Cr Compton, PI Kelly, Rachael Dean
Tumu Whakatere – Chief Executive Performance Review	Mayor Little	Dpty McNulty	Cr Calvert, Cr Tiefenbacher, Cr Abdurahman Cr Matthews
District Licensing	Kate Thomson, Bill Acton, Saar Cohen-Ronen		Clare Needham, Joanne Nicoll, Juliet Philpott, Leaha North, Madeline Kirk-Wilson, Mark Boyce, Simon Tendeter
Subcommittees
Te Urungi Whakatupu Ōhanga – Economic Growth and Development	Cr Tiefenbacher	Cr Reweti	Mayor Little, Dpty McNulty, Cr Calvert, Cr Foon, Cr Young, Cr Abdurahman, PI Kelly
Ngā Toki Whakahaere – CCO Review and Appointments	Cr Matthews	Cr O’Connor	Mayor Little, Cr Al-Rubayee, Cr Compton, Cr Osborne, Cr Abdurahman, PI Hohaia
Te Mataaho o te Hapori – Grants	Cr Young	Cr Al-Rubayee	Mayor Little, Cr Compton, Cr Osborne, Cr Foon, Cr Abdurahman, Cr Chung, PI Hohaia

=== Pouiwi ===
Two pouiwi (tribal representatives) were appointed in 2023 by the Council's Tākai Here partners, Taranaki Whānui ki te Upoko o te Ika and Ngāti Toa Rangatira. They have voting rights on Council committees, including committees of the whole, but not on the full Council. Since 2023 the pouiwi are:

Photo	Name	Appointed by	Responsibilities
	Holden Hohaia	Taranaki Whānui ki te Upoko o te Ika	Member, Kōrau Tōtōpū | Long-term Plan, Finance, and Performance Committee; Member, Pītau Pūmanawa | Grants Subcommittee; Member, Kōrau Tūāpapa | Environment and Infrastructure Committee; Member, Kōrau Mātinitini | Social, Cultural, and Economic Committee
	Liz Kelly	Ngāti Toa Rangatira	Member, Kōrau Tōtōpū | Long-term Plan, Finance, and Performance Committee; Member, Koata Hātepe | Regulatory Processes Committee; Member, Kōrau Tūāpapa | Environment and Infrastructure Committee; Member, Kōrau Mātinitini | Social, Cultural, and Economic Committee; Member, Unaunahi Māhirahira | Audit and Risk Committee

== Community boards ==
The council has created two local community boards under the provisions of Part 4 of the Local Government Act 2002, with members elected using a single transferable vote (STV) system or appointed by the council.

These are:

- Tawa Community Board, having six elected members and two appointed members, representing the northern suburbs of Tawa, Grenada North and Takapū Valley; and
- Mākara/Ōhāriu Community Board, having six elected members, representing the rural suburbs of Ohariu, Mākara and Mākara Beach.

Wellington City Council community boards
Community board	Elected members			Council appointees
Community board	Chair	Deputy chair	Board members	Council appointees
Mākara/Ōhāriu Community Board	Darren Hoskins	Hamish Todd	Chris Renner, Wayne Rudd, Robert O'Brien, (Note: O'Brien was elected unopposed in a by-election held due to the number of candidates being less than the number of vacancies for the Mākara/Ōhāriu Community Board at the 2025 local elections.); Brett Marley (Note: As the number of candidates was less than the number of vacancies for the Mākara/Ōhāriu Community Board at the 2025 local elections, a by-election was to be held to fill the remaining vacancies. However, the number of candidates for the by-election was again less than the number of vacancies, leaving a seat vacant. At their 26 February 2026 ordinary meeting, the board resolved to fill this remaining extraordinary vacancy by appointing Brett Marley to the board.)	
Tawa Community Board	Jill Day	Tim Davin	Carla Bates, Michael Hill, Miriam Moore, Rob Suisted	Cr Greg O’Connor, Cr Andrea Compton

== Chief executive ==
Chief executive of Wellington City Council
- Incumbent; Matt Prosser
- Inaugural holder: David Niven
- Formation: 1 November 1989; 36 years ago
- Website: wellington.govt.nz

The professional head of the civil service is the chief executive, who is appointed by the council.

Chief executives of Wellington City Council
Name	Years
David Niven	1984–1991
Doug Matheson (acting)	1991
Angela C. Griffin	1991–1997
Garry Poole	1998–2013
Kevin Lavery	2013–2019
Barbara McKerrow	2019–2025
Matt Prosser	2025–present

== Council-owned organisations ==
The Wellington City Council owns or directly operates several companies.

The council is a part-owner of Wellington Airport, and has two representatives on the airport's board. Former Mayor Andy Foster was a member of the board from 2016 to 2022 and was criticised for poor attendance at board meetings. In 2022 he was replaced by incoming mayor Tory Whanau, who was also criticised for poor attendance.

The seven council-controlled organisations (CCOs) are

- Basin Reserve Trust
- Karori Sanctuary Trust (Zealandia Te Māra a Tāne)
- Wellington Cable Car Ltd
- Wellington Museums Trust (ExperienceWellington), which operates City Gallery Wellington and the Museum of Wellington City & Sea
- Wellington Regional Economic Development Agency Ltd (WREDA)
- Tiaki Wai manages all three water services for Hutt, Porirua, Upper Hutt and Wellington city councils.
- Wellington Zoo Trust

The council has a similar interest in the Wellington Regional Stadium Trust.

== Elections ==
=== List ===
==== Council ====
- 1989
- (1991)
- 1992
- (1994)
- 1995
- (1996)
- (1997)
- 1998
- (2000)
- 2001
- 2004
- 2007
- 2010
- 2013
- 2016
- (2017)
- 2019
- 2022
- (2024)
- 2025
- (2026)

==== Mayoral ====
- 1989
- 1992
- 1995
- 1998
- 2001
- 2004
- 2007
- 2010
- 2013
- 2016
- 2019
- 2022
- 2025

== Wards ==
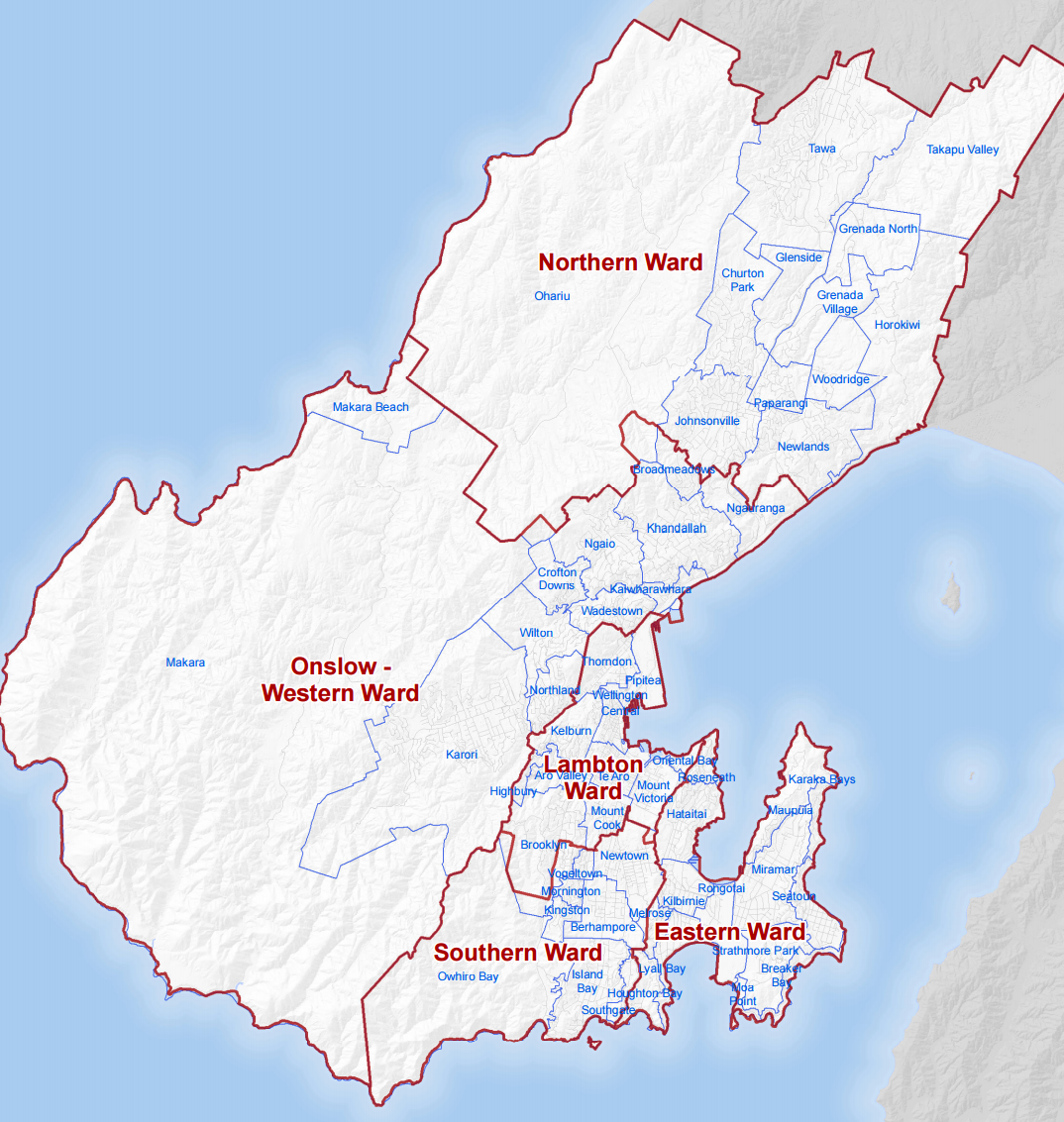
Map of the wards of Wellington City Council

The city is divided into six local electoral wards. The wards were given Māori names in 2018, after consultation with mana whenua.

=== Takapū / Northern general ward ===
The Takapū / Northern general ward is represented on the council by 3 councillors, and covers the suburbs of Churton Park, Glenside, Grenada North, Grenada Village, Horokiwi, Johnsonville, Newlands, Ōhāriu, Paparangi, Takapu Valley, Tawa and Woodridge.

=== Wharangi / Onslow-Western general ward ===
The Wharangi / Onslow-Western general ward is represented on the council by 3 councillors, and covers the suburbs of Broadmeadows, Crofton Downs, Kaiwharawhara, Karori, Khandallah, Mākara, Mākara Beach, Ngaio, Ngauranga, Northland, Wadestown and Wilton.

=== Pukehīnau / Lambton general ward ===
The Pukehīnau / Lambton general ward is represented on the council by 3 councillors, and covers the suburbs of Aro Valley, Highbury, Kelburn, Mount Cook, Mount Victoria, Oriental Bay, Pipitea, Te Aro, Thorndon and Wellington Central.

=== Motukairangi / Eastern general ward ===
The Motukairangi / Eastern general ward is represented on the council by 3 councillors, and covers the suburbs of Breaker Bay, Hataitai, Houghton Bay, Karaka Bays, Kilbirnie, Lyall Bay, Maupuia, Melrose, Miramar, Moa Point, Rongotai, Roseneath, Seatoun and Strathmore Park.

=== Paekawakawa / Southern general ward ===
The Paekawakawa / Southern general ward is represented on the council by 2 councillors, and covers the suburbs of Berhampore, Brooklyn, Island Bay, Kingston, Mornington, Newtown, Ōwhiro Bay, Southgate and Vogeltown.

=== Te Whanganui-a-Tara Māori ward ===
In May 2021, the Wellington City Council voted 13–2 to establish a Māori ward, with the Te Whanganui-a-Tara Māori ward first contested in the 2022 elections.

Te Whanganui-a-Tara Māori ward is represented on the council by 1 councillor, and covers the entire city.

In July 2024, the National-led coalition government passed the Local Government (Electoral Legislation and Māori Wards and Māori Constituencies) Amendment Act 2024 which reinstated the requirement that councils must hold a referendum before establishing Māori wards or constituencies. In September 2024, the council voted 13–3 to affirm their decision to establish the Māori ward, thereby triggering a referendum on the ward to be held alongside the 2025 local elections. Wellington voters elected to retain the Māori ward.

== Offices ==
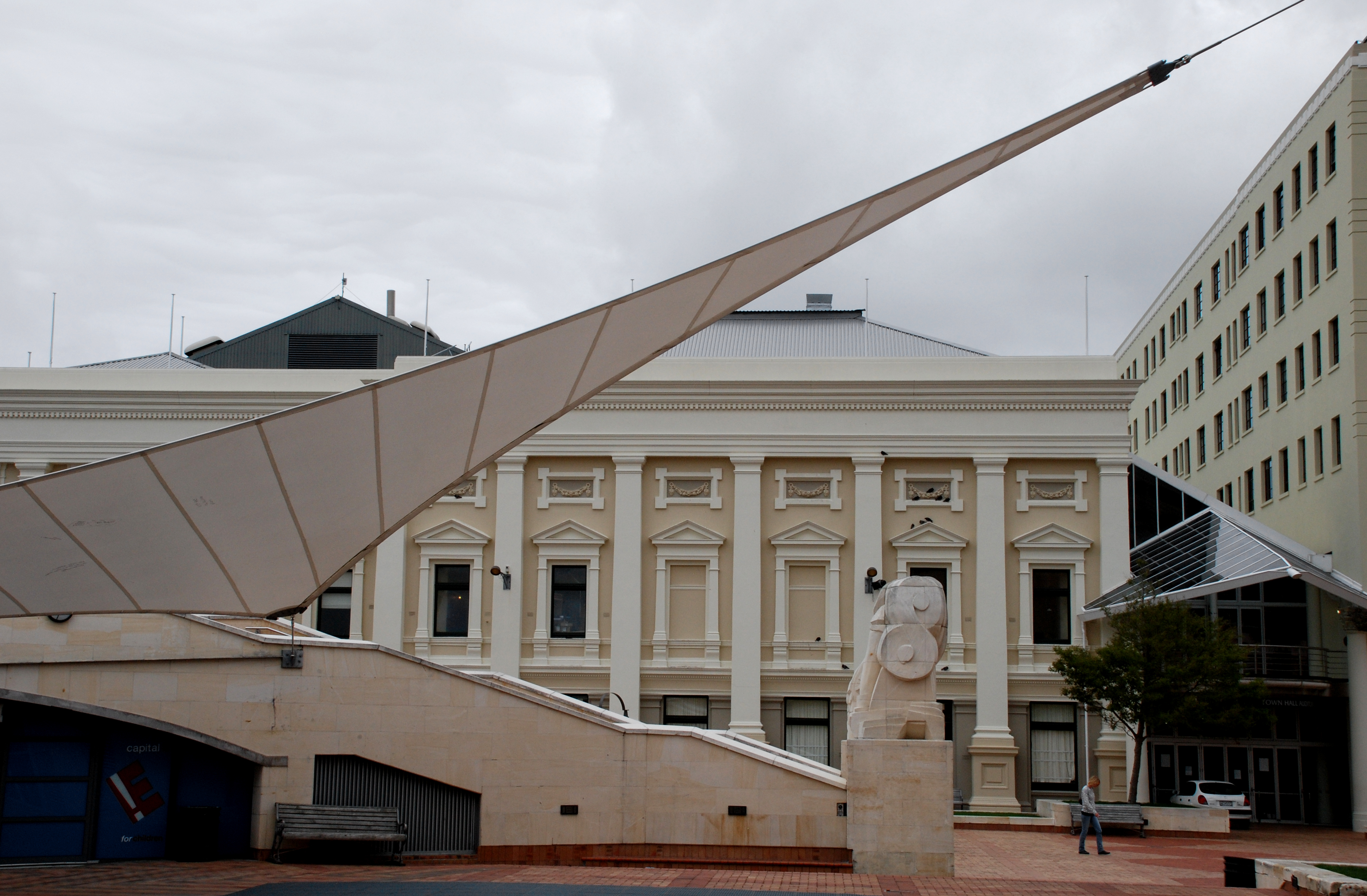
Wellington Town Hall, incorporating the Mayor's Office and Council Chambers

The Wellington City Council owned and until May 2019 operated from a complex on Wakefield Street, with various extensions each representing a distinctive architectural period. The complex incorporated the Wellington Town Hall which opened in 1904, with the most recent extension completed in 1991 alongside the Wellington Central Library.

The Wakefield Street complex was cleared of back office functions, and from 28 May 2019 onwards was closed completely, after which it was demolished. Most of the council's central office staff were located in commercial premises at 113 The Terrace until 2026, when they moved to Harris Street..

Due to repairs also being needed to the Wellington Central Library, and Capital E, all of the civic buildings on Civic Square except for the City Gallery were closed until June 2026, when Te Matapihi (Wellington Central Library) reopened. While the Library was closed, the council operated two public service desks out of Johnsonville Library and Te Awe Library in the CBD.

== Civic symbols ==
=== Coat of arms ===
The Wellington City Council first adopted a coat of arms in 1878. This coat of arms had the description:

Coat of arms of the City of Wellington (former)
Crest Mural crown or surmounted by a dolphin embowed azure (supremacy by naval position). Mantle, azure and gules. Escutcheon Quarterly 1st azure out of a ducal crown or a demi-lion rampant gules holding in the paws a forked pennon flowing to the sinister, charged with the cross of St. George the ends gules (crest of the Duke of Wellington). 2nd argent. A galley with sails furled and oars and pennons sable (the commerce of the city). 3rd gules. A garb (a wheat or wheat sheaf) proper (the agricultural interests). 4th azure. A Golden Fleece proper cinctured gules (the pastoral interests). Supporters Dexter. The British lion. Sinister a moa but proper. Motto Suprema a Situ (Supreme by position) Other elements Under the motto "1840" (date of the foundation of the City and Colony).

The Wellington City Corporation was granted an official coat of arms by the College of Arms in 1951, the blazon for which is:

Coat of arms of the City of Wellington
Crest On a Mural Crown Argent a Dolphin Naiant Azure, Mantled Gules. Escutcheon Quarterly Gules and Azure, a Cross Or between; In the first quarter a Fleece Or; in the second quarter on Water barry wavy proper in base a Lymphad sail furled pennon and flags flying Argent; in the third quarter a Garb Or; in the fourth quarter five Plates in Saltire Argent. Supporters On the dexter side a Lion gorged with a Collar and Chain reflexed over the back Or, and on the sinister side a Moa proper. Motto Suprema a Situ (Supreme by position) Symbolism The shield is divided vertically and horizontally, quarter of which the first and fourth are red and the remaining pair are blue. A golden cross is placed over the entire shield centrally between these quarters. The top left quarter contains a golden fleece (usually depicted as a whole sheep with a band around its middle). The second quarter is depicted as a silver sailing ship (lymphad) with its sails furled as it would be in port but with its flags flying, placed on waves in their natural colour. The third quarter contains a golden wheat sheaf, and the fourth has five silver discs arranged in a saltire. The mural crown (a crown depicted as if made of stonewalling) is common as a crest in city coats of arms. It is coloured silver, and from its top comes a swimming dolphin. Around the crest is mantling in red. The supporters on either side of the shield are a golden heraldic lion with a chained collar around its neck to the left, and a moa in its natural colouring on the right (the terms "sinister" and "dexter" relate to the shield from the holder's point of view, not the viewer's, thus dexter is the viewer's left and sinister is the viewer's right). The base on which the supporters stand is normally not emblazoned but is left to the artist to decide. The Motto may be translated as "Supreme by position".

=== Badge and flag ===
The flag of Wellington

Wellington City Council was also granted a badge by the College of Arms in 1963, with the heraldic description:

A Roundel Azure thereon a Lymphad Or the sail argent charged with a Dolphin naiant Azure pennon and flags flying Argent each charged with a Cross Gules.

The flag of Wellington, adopted on 12 December 1962, incorporates the city's badge over a black cross on a gold field.

== Sister-city relationships ==
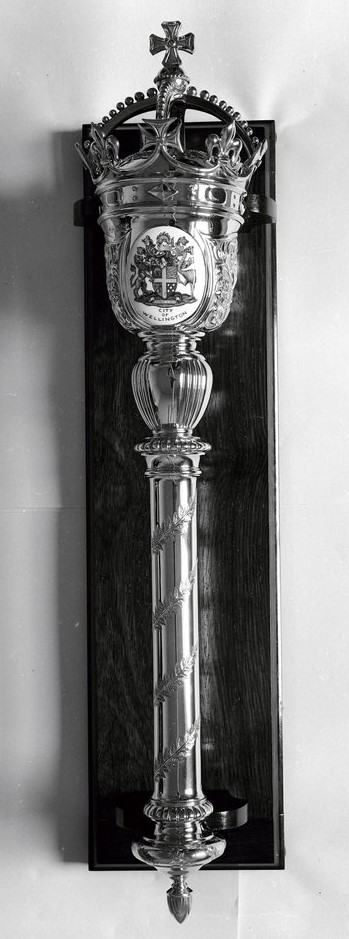
The ceremonial mace of Wellington City Council, gifted to the city by Harrogate in 1954

Wellington City Council has established international partnerships with the following cities:

=== Sister cities ===
- Sydney, Australia
- Canberra, Australia
- Beijing, China
- Xiamen, China
- Sakai, Japan
- Harrogate, United Kingdom
- Hania, Greece
- Çanakkale, Turkey

=== Friendly cities ===
- Tianjin, China

=== Proposed future sister cities ===
- Ramallah, Palestine

== See also ==
Territorial authorities bordering Wellington City Council:

- Hutt City Council
- Porirua City Council

== Sources ==
- Betts, George (1970). Betts on Wellington: a city and its politics. Wellington: A. H. & A. W. Reed Ltd. ISBN 0 589 00469 7.
- A Complete Guide To Heraldry by A.C. Fox-Davies 1909.
- Yska, Redmer (2006). Wellington: Biography of a city. Auckland: Reed. ISBN 0-7900-1117-4.
