= Newlands, Wellington =

Suburb of Wellington City, New Zealand

Newlands
- Suburb
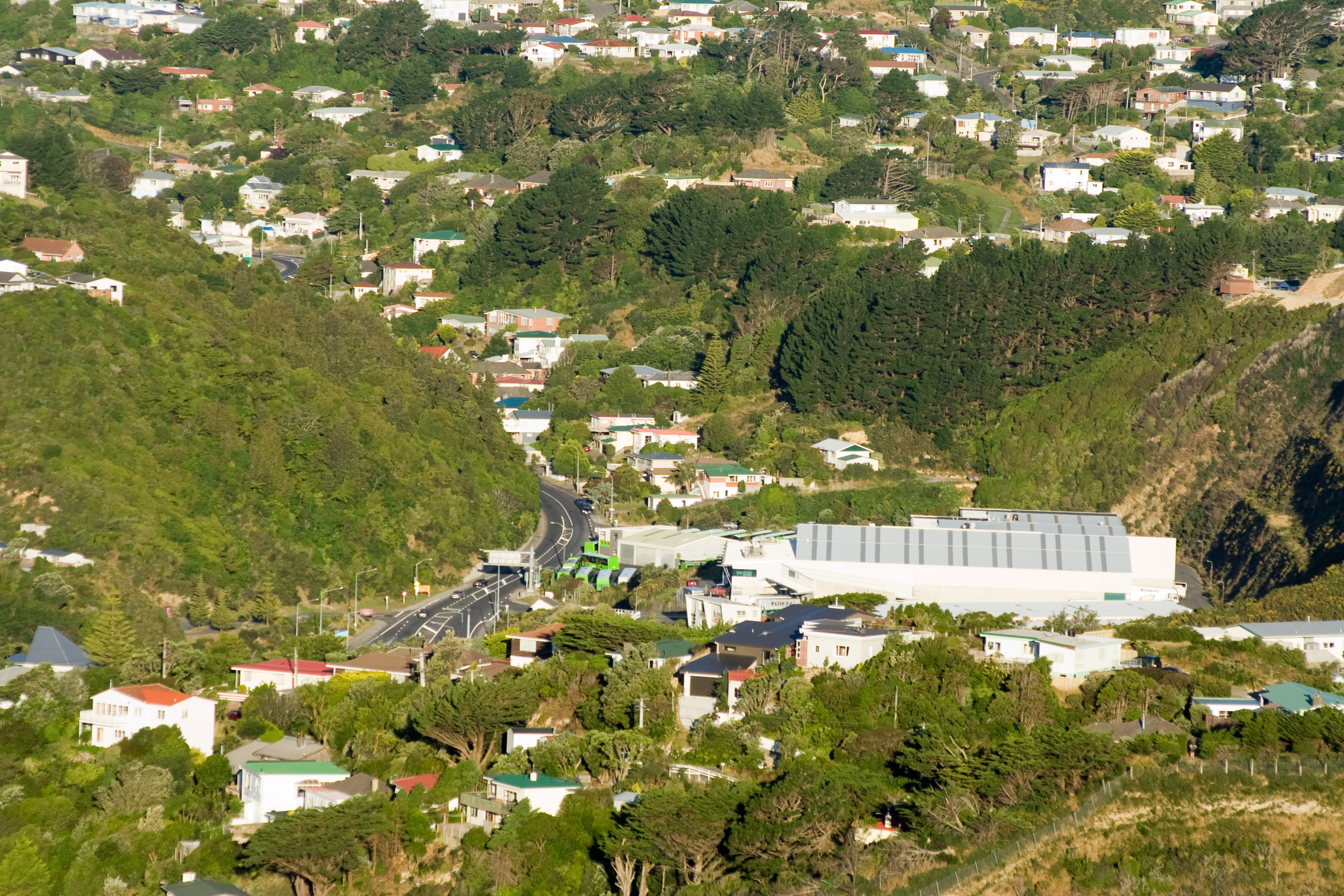
- Newlands Road with Newlands Bus Depot in the foreground
- Interactive map of Newlands
- Coordinates: 41°13′26″S 174°49′23″E
- Country: New Zealand
- City: Wellington City
- Local authority: Wellington City Council
- Electoral ward: Takapū/Northern Ward; Wharangi/Onslow-Western Ward; Te Whanganui-a-Tara Māori Ward

Area
  - Land: 687 ha (1,700 acres)

Population (June 2025)
  - Total: 8,940
  - Density: 1,300/km^{2} (3,370/sq mi)
- Postcode: 6037

	Paparangi, Woodridge, Grenada	Horokiwi
Johnsonville	Newlands	Wellington Harbour
	Ngauranga

Newlands is one of the northern suburbs of Wellington, New Zealand. It lies approximately 8.1 km north of the city centre and to the east of its nearest neighbour Johnsonville. It has a long history of early settlement and originally was farmed including being the early source of Wellington's milk. Newlands is located in a valley and covers two ridgelines, the side of one of which overlooks Wellington Harbour and up to the Hutt Valley.

== History ==
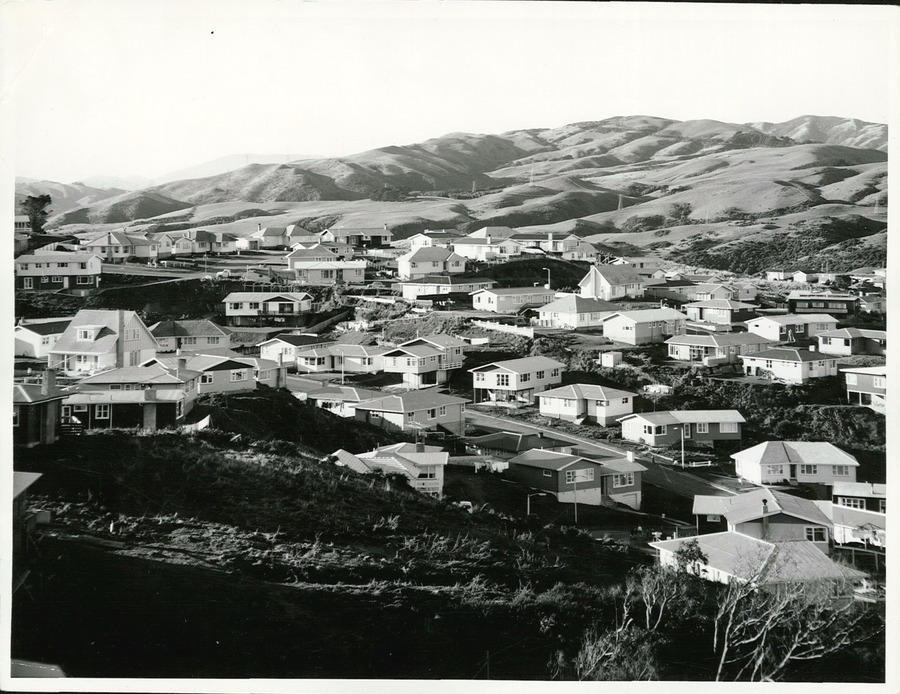
Newlands in 1969

The area that modern Newlands occupies was originally known as Papararangi which is te reo Māori for "cluster of hills". A 40 ha area was sold during the 1840–41 land ballots run by the New Zealand Company. There are two theories to the suburb's name. The first is that it was named after Thomas Newland, who arrived in New Zealand from London in 1875 aboard the ship Avalanche and ran a business making glue and oil in neighbouring Johnsonville before becoming manager of the manure department of the Wellington Meat Export Company's works in 1892. Thomas Newland was close friends of Walter Futter who owned land in Newlands. The second theory is that it was simply the "New Land" near Johnsonville.

The area was mostly used as a pig and dairy farm, providing Wellington most of their town milk supply from the 1920s to the 1950s. Dairy farms were run by Bill Miles of Newlands Dairy Limited who purchased James Purchase’s farm in Glanmire Rd and ran 100 cows, also Pearce and Tristram. After the Second World War Miles subdivided for housing; initially in Wakely Road, then in Miles Crescent, Lyndfield Lane, Black Rock Road and Glanmire Road. Ernest Hoskings grazed his dairy herd in Johnsonville, Newlands and Horokiwi.

Newlands was the location of the 1923 "Newlands Baby Farmers", where Daniel Cooper was found guilty and executed for murder, performing illegal abortions and baby farming.

Brandon's Rock, the highest point in Newlands, has a history of its own. Brandon's Rock was named after distinguished lawyer and politician Alfred de Bathe Brandon. Brandon also happened to be the father of the mayor of Wellington, also named Alfred Brandon, who held the position from 1893 till 1894. Traces of gold were discovered on Brandon's Rock by prospectors in 1870, but tests showed that the gold was not pure enough and the search for the metal halted for many years. Although another group sought after gold on Brandon's Rock a decade later, this too proved unprofitable. It is thought by some that Gold could still be discovered in the area. Brandon's Rock was nicknamed Nun's Cap by sailors and those familiar with the harbour before the existence of harbour beacons. Sailors learned to use Brandon's Rock as a navigational point and also to avoid Barrett Reef by staying east of the imaginary line between it and Point Gordon.

A war memorial was erected after World War I at the crossroads of the gorge road; the original memorial was replaced after World War II because of road widening. Listing local dead from both world wars, it is now located on the corner of Newlands and Wakely road

== Demographics ==
Newlands, comprising the statistical areas of Newlands North, Newlands East and Newlands South, covers 6.87 km^{2} (2.65 sq mi). It had an estimated population of 8,940 as of June 2025, with a population density of 1,301 people per km^{2}.

Historical population
Year	Pop.	±% p.a.
2006	6,756	—
2013	7,497	+1.50%
2018	8,082	+1.51%
2023	8,340	+0.63%
The 2006 population is for a smaller area of 6.82 km^{2}. Source:

Newlands had a population of 8,340 in the 2023 New Zealand census, an increase of 258 people (3.2%) since the 2018 census, and an increase of 843 people (11.2%) since the 2013 census. There were 4,128 males, 4,161 females, and 54 people of other genders in 2,982 dwellings. 5.1% of people identified as LGBTIQ+. The median age was 35.0 years (compared with 38.1 years nationally). There were 1,542 people (18.5%) aged under 15 years, 1,782 (21.4%) aged 15 to 29, 4,221 (50.6%) aged 30 to 64, and 795 (9.5%) aged 65 or older.

People could identify as more than one ethnicity. The results were 57.4% European (Pākehā); 12.1% Māori; 7.9% Pasifika; 32.7% Asian; 3.7% Middle Eastern, Latin American and African New Zealanders (MELAA); and 1.9% other, which includes people giving their ethnicity as "New Zealander". English was spoken by 94.6%, Māori by 3.1%, Samoan by 2.1%, and other languages by 27.3%. No language could be spoken by 2.6% (e.g. too young to talk). New Zealand Sign Language was known by 0.7%. The percentage of people born overseas was 36.9, compared with 28.8% nationally.

Religious affiliations were 28.3% Christian, 8.1% Hindu, 3.5% Islam, 0.6% Māori religious beliefs, 2.3% Buddhist, 0.4% New Age, 0.2% Jewish, and 2.1% other religions. People who answered that they had no religion were 48.6%, and 6.0% of people did not answer the census question.

Of those at least 15 years old, 2,616 (38.5%) people had a bachelor's or higher degree, 2,952 (43.4%) had a post-high school certificate or diploma, and 1,236 (18.2%) people exclusively held high school qualifications. The median income was $56,500, compared with $41,500 nationally. 1,347 people (19.8%) earned over $100,000 compared to 12.1% nationally. The employment status of those at least 15 was 4,239 (62.4%) full-time, 783 (11.5%) part-time, and 165 (2.4%) unemployed.

Individual statistical areas
Name	Area (km^{2})	Population	Density (per km^{2})	Dwellings	Median age	Median income
Newlands North	0.89	3,018	3,391	1,137	35.3 years	$54,400
Newlands South	4.00	2,451	613	861	33.8 years	$59,300
Newlands East	1.99	2,877	1,446	984	35.9 years	$56,500
New Zealand					38.1 years	$41,500

== Geography ==
Newlands is approximately 138 m above sea level, with its highest point being Brandon's Rock, which lies along the Paparangi Ridge. The Paparangi Ridge runs along the harbour and stretches from Ngauranga Gorge to Horokiwi. Gilberd Bush Reserve lies to the east of Newlands, towards State Highway 2, and is located where the topography is too steep and hilly for use. Newlands is situated not far from the Wellington Fault, which is capable of producing earthquakes of magnitude 8.

=== Weather ===
The warmest month of the year for Newlands is February, while the coldest month is July. The average high temperature is 14.66 °C and the average low temperature is 11.95 °C, making the climate fairly moderate throughout the year without major fluctuations.

== Facilities ==
Newlands town centre contains a New World supermarket, a community centre and medical services along with several other stores. Johnsonville mall and nearby public facilities are also a short distance away.

=== Community centre ===
The Newlands Community Centre was opened in 2009 and is home to a drop in centre, Newlands Toy Library and many community groups.

=== Volunteer fire brigade ===
Newlands Volunteer Fire Brigade was established in 1965 on Newlands Road and has 22 members and one appliance; a 2020 Iveco type 1 pumping appliance.

=== Parks and reserves ===
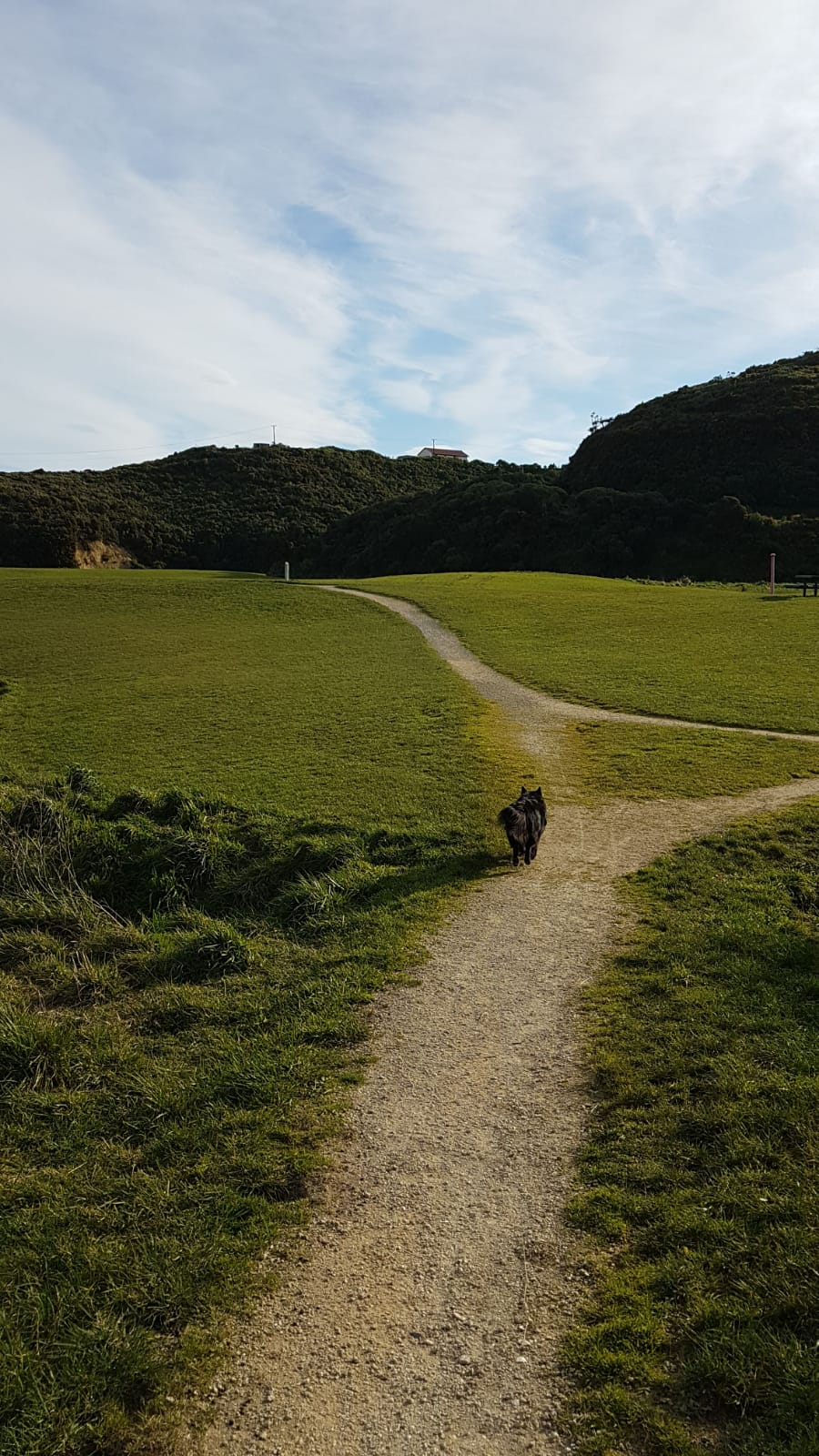
Waihinahina Park in 2006

Newlands has a number of parks and reserves, including:

- Newlands Park and Pukehuia playground
- Pinkerton Park
- Seton Nossiter Park
- Waihinahina park
- Gilberd Bush Reserve
- Edgecombe Street play area
- Kenmore Street Play Area
- Lyndfield Lane play area
- Cheyne Walk play area
- Salford Street Play Area

=== Religious sites ===
- St. Michael and All Angels Anglican Church
- St. Andrews Catholic Church
- Newlands Baptist Church
- Newlands Christian Assembly
- Kingdom Hall of Jehovahs Witnesses
- Kurinchi Kumaran Temple
- Hare Krishna (ISKCON) Temple
- Newlands Mosque

== Transport ==
=== Roads ===
Newlands is connected to Ngauranga, and further Wellington via the Ngauranga Gorge towards the South, and through Stewart Drive and Johnsonville to Porirua to the North via State Highway 1, constructed in the 1960s.

=== Bus services ===
Newlands is served by several bus services which link it to the wider Wellington area, operated by Newlands Coach Services on behalf of Metlink Wellington. Several of these services link Newlands with the nearby Johnsonville, where further transport options are available.

Newlands Coach Services operates a bus depot next to the State Highway 1 overbridge.

== Education ==
=== School enrolment zones ===
Newlands is within the enrolment zones for Newlands College, Newlands School and St Oran's College.

=== Secondary education ===
Newlands College is a state coeducational secondary school located on Bracken Road in Newlands. It has a roll of 1,263 as of March 2026. It opened in 1970.

=== Primary and intermediate education ===
Newlands has three primary schools and one intermediate school:

- Newlands Intermediate is located on Bracken road, next to Newlands College, with a roll of 519 as of March 2026. It was open by 1979.
- Newlands School is a contributing primary school located on Newlands Road with a roll of 287. It opened in 1906, and gained its first permanent classroom in 1920.
- Rewa Rewa School is a contributing primary school located on Padnell Crescent with a roll of 128. It was open by 1981.
- Bellevue School is a contributing primary school located on Bancroft Terrace with a roll of 230. It opened in 1967.
