= Grenada Village =

Suburb of Wellington City, New Zealand

Grenada
- Suburb
- Interactive map of Grenada
- Coordinates: 41°12′00″S 174°49′48″E
- Country: New Zealand
- City: Wellington
- Local authority: Wellington City Council
- Electoral ward: Takapū/Northern Ward; Te Whanganui-a-Tara Māori Ward

Area
  - Land: 145 ha (360 acres)

Population (June 2025)
  - Total: 1,900
  - Density: 1,300/km^{2} (3,400/sq mi)
- Postcode: 6037

Redwood	Grenada North
Glenside	Grenada Village	Horokiwi
	Paparangi

Grenada Village is one of the northern suburbs of Wellington, New Zealand, between Paparangi and Grenada North.

In 1991, a new landfill was opened in Grenada, with direct access via an overbridge to the adjacent motorway. A road extension would give Newlands and Paparangi access to the motorway, but the Grenada Village Progressive Association was concerned about any increase in traffic and car speeds. From 1994, the Wellington City Council (WCC) consulted with residents, and in 2009, the "Mark Avenue Extension" connecting the two roads was opened by the mayor. The new subdivision was called Hunter Hills, and future roads would give access to the Lincolnshire Farms development.

== History ==
Grenada, originally known as the McMillan Block and then as Grenada Village, was initially planned by Paparangi Properties in 1975. It was then taken over by Grenada Estates, who started development in 1977, with large scale developments including a school and shopping centre planned. Development slowed in the 1980s with the rise in oil prices, but continued steadily over the next twenty years. The suburb was named after Grenada in the Caribbean, and many streets are named after Caribbean islands.

== Demographics ==
Grenada Village statistical area covers 1.45 km^{2} (0.56 sq mi). It had an estimated population of 1,900 as of June 2025, with a population density of 1,310 people per km^{2}.

Historical population
Year	Pop.	±% p.a.
2006	981	—
2013	1,248	+3.50%
2018	1,704	+6.43%
2023	1,830	+1.44%

Grenada Village had a population of 1,830 in the 2023 New Zealand census, an increase of 126 people (7.4%) since the 2018 census, and an increase of 582 people (46.6%) since the 2013 census. There were 930 males, 897 females, and 6 people of other genders in 600 dwellings. 2.8% of people identified as LGBTIQ+. The median age was 37.1 years (compared with 38.1 years nationally). There were 423 people (23.1%) aged under 15 years, 288 (15.7%) aged 15 to 29, 951 (52.0%) aged 30 to 64, and 168 (9.2%) aged 65 or older.

People could identify as more than one ethnicity. The results were 56.9% European (Pākehā); 9.0% Māori; 5.4% Pasifika; 37.2% Asian; 3.6% Middle Eastern, Latin American and African New Zealanders (MELAA); and 1.6% other, which includes people giving their ethnicity as "New Zealander". English was spoken by 94.1%, Māori by 1.3%, Samoan by 1.0%, and other languages by 31.8%. No language could be spoken by 3.0% (e.g. too young to talk). New Zealand Sign Language was known by 1.0%. The percentage of people born overseas was 39.5, compared with 28.8% nationally.

Religious affiliations were 33.8% Christian, 7.2% Hindu, 1.3% Islam, 0.2% Māori religious beliefs, 2.8% Buddhist, 0.2% New Age, and 2.3% other religions. People who answered that they had no religion were 47.7%, and 4.6% of people did not answer the census question.

Of those at least 15 years old, 540 (38.4%) people had a bachelor's or higher degree, 621 (44.1%) had a post-high school certificate or diploma, and 243 (17.3%) people exclusively held high school qualifications. The median income was $62,500, compared with $41,500 nationally. 342 people (24.3%) earned over $100,000 compared to 12.1% nationally. The employment status of those at least 15 was 930 (66.1%) full-time, 156 (11.1%) part-time, and 24 (1.7%) unemployed.
