= Horokiwi =

Suburb of Wellington City, New Zealand

- Suburb
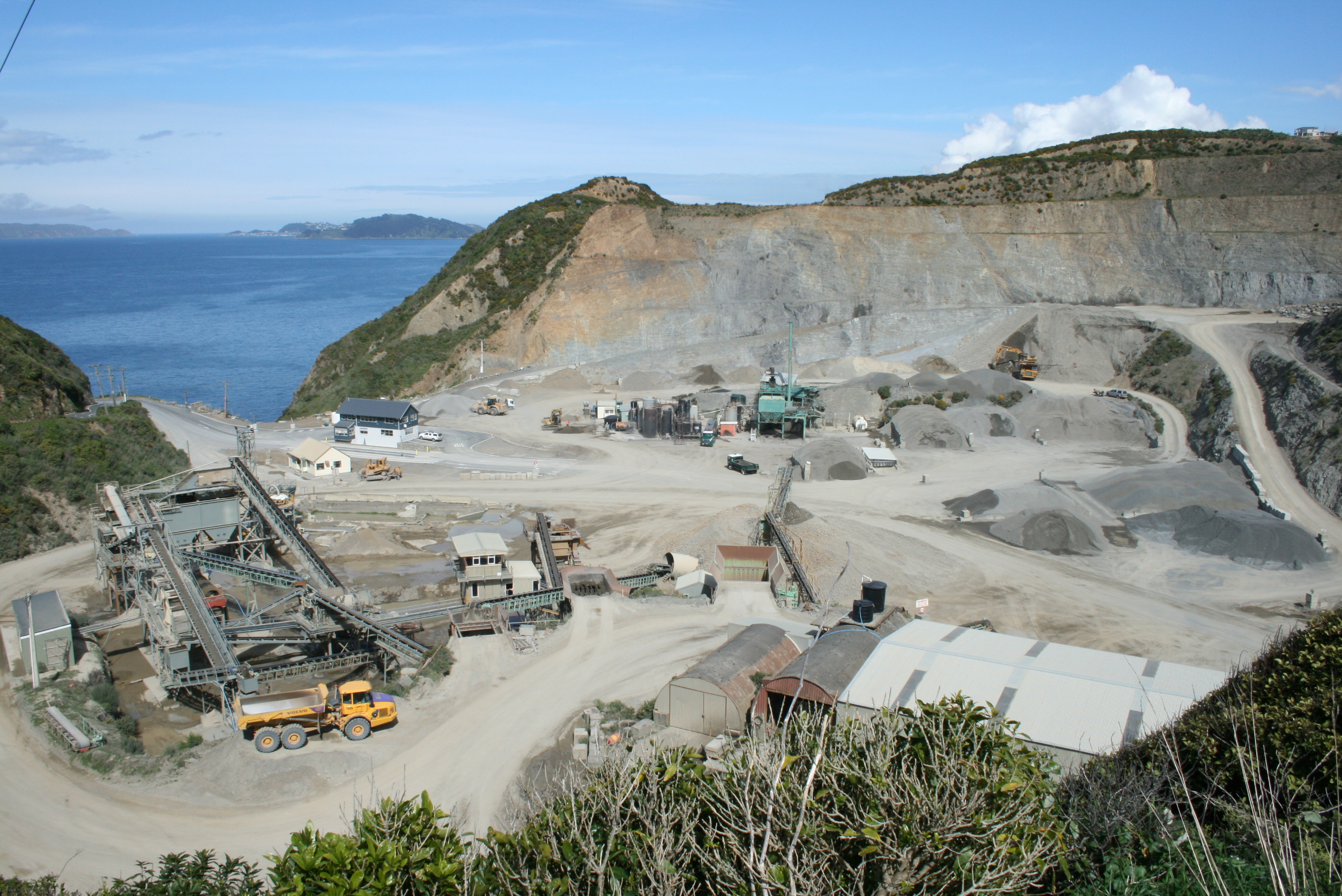
- Horokiwi Quarry
- Interactive map of Horokiwi
- Coordinates: 41°12′25″S 174°50′56″E
- Country: New Zealand
- City: Wellington
- Local authority: Wellington City Council
- Electoral ward: Takapū/Northern; Te Whanganui-a-Tara Māori Ward

Area
  - Land: 726 ha (1,790 acres)

Population (2023 census)
  - Total: 183
  - Density: 25.2/km^{2} (65.3/sq mi)

	Takapu Valley
Grenada North, Woodridge, Newlands	Horokiwi	Lower Hutt
	Wellington Harbour

Horokiwi is an outer northern suburb of Wellington. The area is semi-rural and there are no schools; most children attend schools in nearby Lower Hutt, and Primary School zoning is for Korokoro. The only feature other than houses and farms is Horokiwi Quarry.

== Access and roads ==
The only access to Horokiwi is via Horokiwi Road, a road that climbs up a hill and branches off the Petone-Wellington motorway. There are only five streets/roads; Horokiwi Road, Hillcroft Road, Lincolnshire Road, Woollaston Way and Van Der Velden Way. The former runs for approximately 6.5 km, and the final kilometre eventually reaches Belmont Regional Park and becomes much more narrow. It also provides scenic views of Lower Hutt, Wellington Harbour, and other northern suburbs of Wellington such as Tawa and Grenada North.

Since 2010 the only access to Horokiwi is from the northbound lane of the State Highway (SH2), causing around 8 km detours for residents travelling from North.

The Caribbean Avenue Reserve can be accessed from Horokiwi Road.

== Earliest history of Horokiwi ==
The Horokiwi/Korokoro area has historically been used for travel between the Hutt Valley and Porirua. European settlers in the district in the early part of the 19th century travelled for the most part on well-used old Maori tracks. In the 1880s, prominent Wellington settler James Coutts Crawford wrote about his journey from the Kapiti Coast to Port Nicholson following his arrival in New Zealand in late 1839:

"Passing Titahi Bay, and the pretty shores of Porirua, we entered the main bush, and travelled up the stream, in a line with whose course the present road stretches. We crossed and recrossed the stream about seventy times, until at length the path ascended and led us over the summit of the range overlooking Korokoro. The whole distance traversed, with the exception of some few patches of cultivation at Porirua, was through dense and uncleared forest. The Hutt Valley presented a dense forest of gigantic trees, and a large pa was visible at Pitone. As we descended the hill, our advance was hindered by a mass of newly-felled forest, which was cleared and ready for burning off. Our escort now commenced firing guns to attract the attention of the fishermen; and as we descended the hill the canoes approached the shore, so that when we reached it, they were there to meet us" (Coutts 1880: pp 27–28).

After the Petone settlement was removed and relocated to its current site of Wellington City, the track from Kaiwharawhara across Paerau hill was used more. This track joined with the Korokoro track at Takapu and then carried on to Porirua.

== Demographics ==
Horokiwi covers an area of 7.26 km^{2} (2.80 sq mi) It is part of the larger Takapu-Horokiwi statistical area.

Historical population
Year	Pop.	±% p.a.
2006	177	—
2013	174	−0.24%
2018	183	+1.01%
2023	183	+0.00%

Horokiwi had a population of 183 in the 2023 New Zealand census, unchanged since the 2018 census, and an increase of 9 people (5.2%) since the 2013 census. There were 96 males and 84 females in 72 dwellings. 3.3% of people identified as LGBTIQ+. The median age was 50.7 years (compared with 38.1 years nationally). There were 30 people (16.4%) aged under 15 years, 21 (11.5%) aged 15 to 29, 105 (57.4%) aged 30 to 64, and 27 (14.8%) aged 65 or older.

People could identify as more than one ethnicity. The results were 86.9% European (Pākehā); 9.8% Māori; 8.2% Asian; and 1.6% Middle Eastern, Latin American and African New Zealanders (MELAA). English was spoken by 98.4%, Māori by 1.6%, and other languages by 19.7%. No language could be spoken by 1.6% (e.g. too young to talk). The percentage of people born overseas was 26.2, compared with 28.8% nationally.

Religious affiliations were 21.3% Christian, 1.6% Hindu, 3.3% Islam, 1.6% New Age, and 1.6% other religions. People who answered that they had no religion were 62.3%, and 6.6% of people did not answer the census question.

Of those at least 15 years old, 51 (33.3%) people had a bachelor's or higher degree, 75 (49.0%) had a post-high school certificate or diploma, and 21 (13.7%) people exclusively held high school qualifications. The median income was $68,200, compared with $41,500 nationally. 51 people (33.3%) earned over $100,000 compared to 12.1% nationally. The employment status of those at least 15 was 99 (64.7%) full-time, 18 (11.8%) part-time, and 3 (2.0%) unemployed.
