= Glenside, New Zealand =

Suburb of Wellington, New Zealand

Glenside
- Suburb
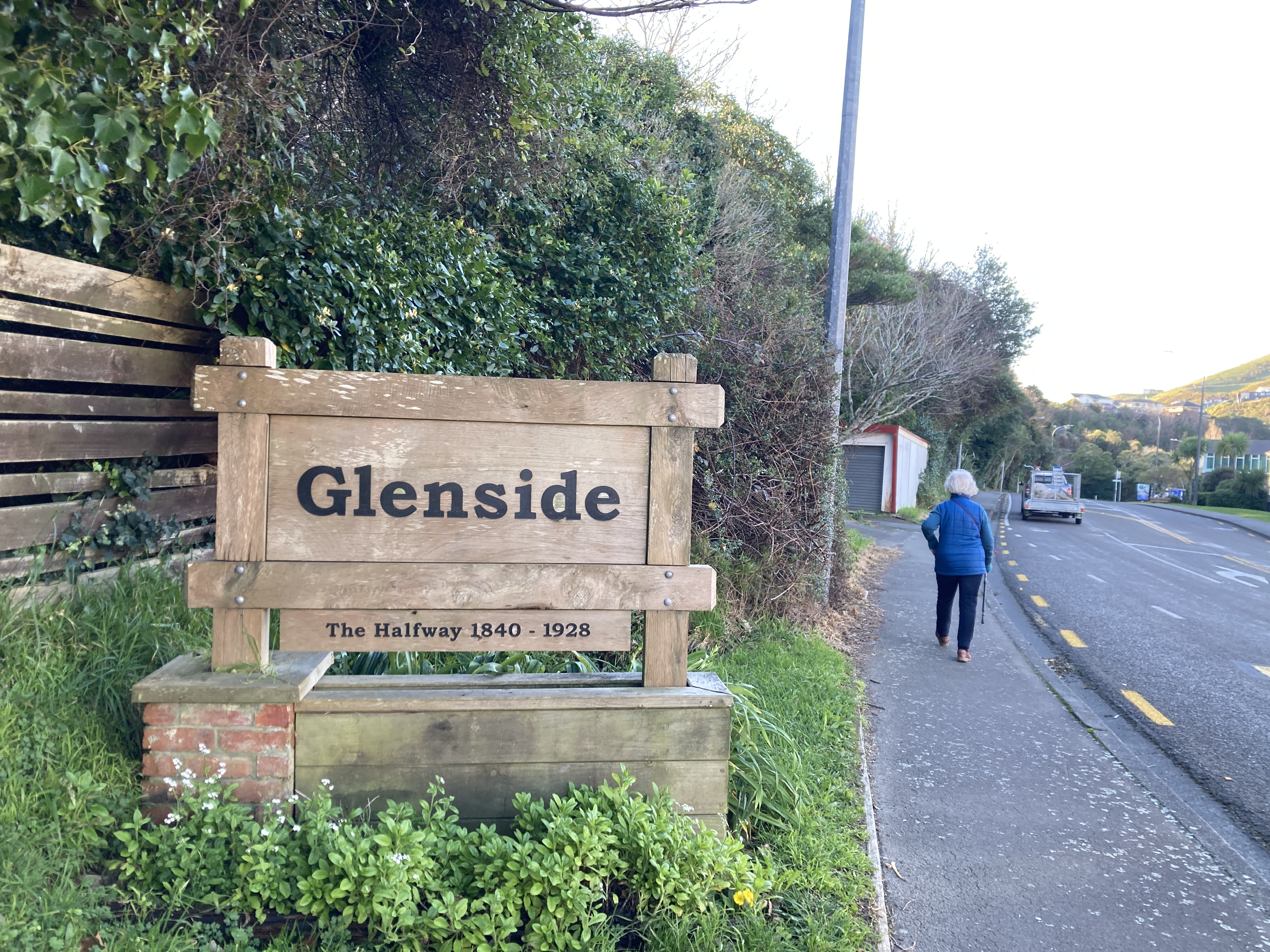

- Location within New Zealand Wellington
- Coordinates: 41°12′21″S 174°48′42″E
- Country: New Zealand
- City: Wellington City Council
- Electoral ward: Northern Ward

Area
  - Land: 248 ha (610 acres)

Population (June 2025)
  - Total: 610
  - Density: 250/km^{2} (640/sq mi)

	Tawa
Ohariu	Glenside	Grenada, Horokiwi
	Johnsonville

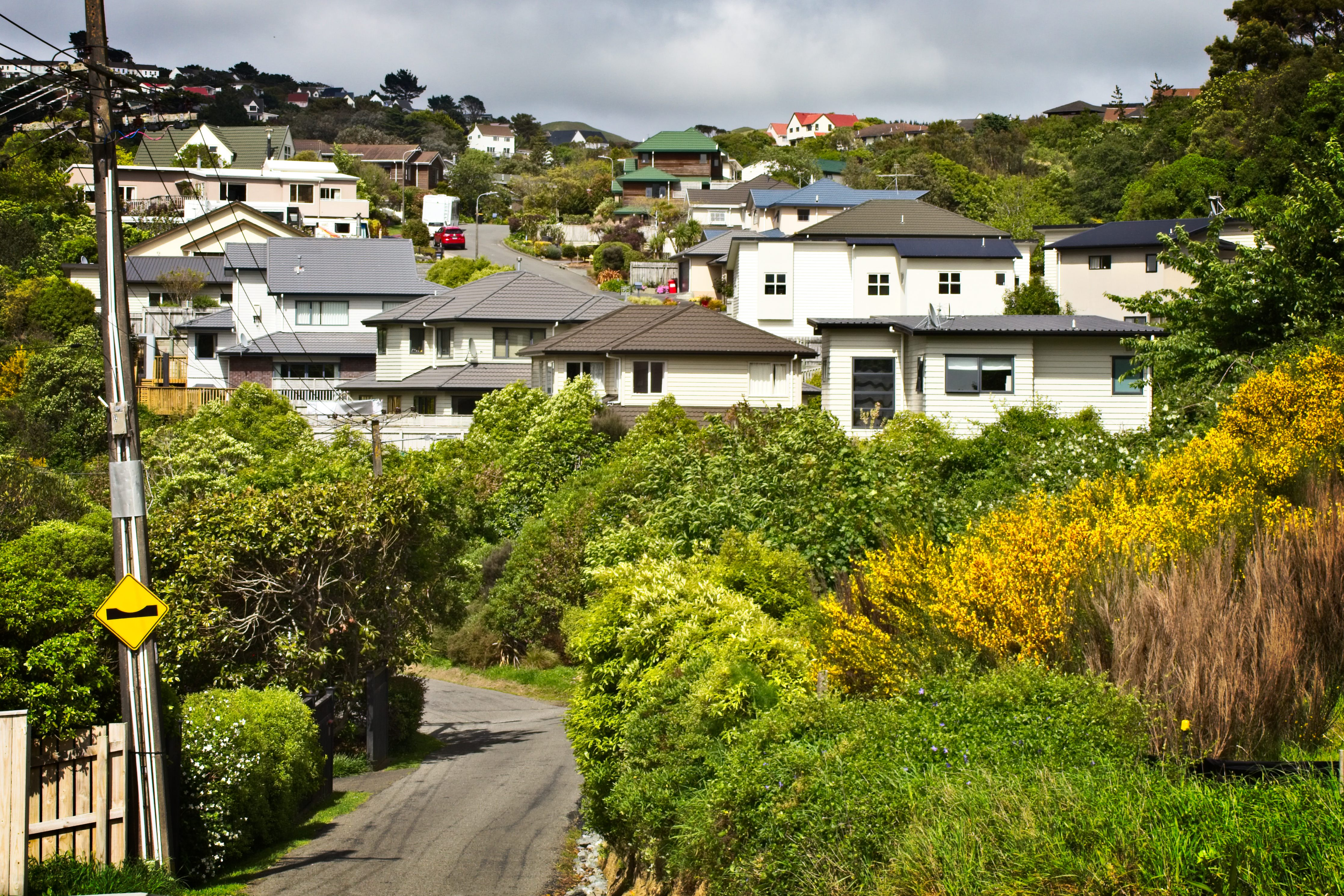
Glenside, Wellington

Glenside is a suburb of Wellington, New Zealand. It is bounded by Tawa to the North, Churton Park to the West/South and Grenada across the motorway to the East.

Glenside was first settled in 1840. Ngāti Toa are the mana whenua. The area was known as "The Halfway" from 1840 until 1928.

== Transport ==
Middleton Road was part of the 19th-century Old Porirua Road north from Wellington.

Public transport is provided by No 60 and No 60e Metlink buses from Wellington via Johnsonville which run down Middleton Road to Tawa and Porirua.

A 2017 report said that a proposed commuter railway station near Churton Park on the Kāpiti Line (and actually in Glenside) was too expensive.

== Renaming ==
A competition was held to rename the suburb in 1928, to coincide with the opening of the Post Office. Local landowner Mrs P.C. Watts' suggestion of Glenside was selected. She felt the area was reminiscent of a Scottish glen.

== The Halfway House ==
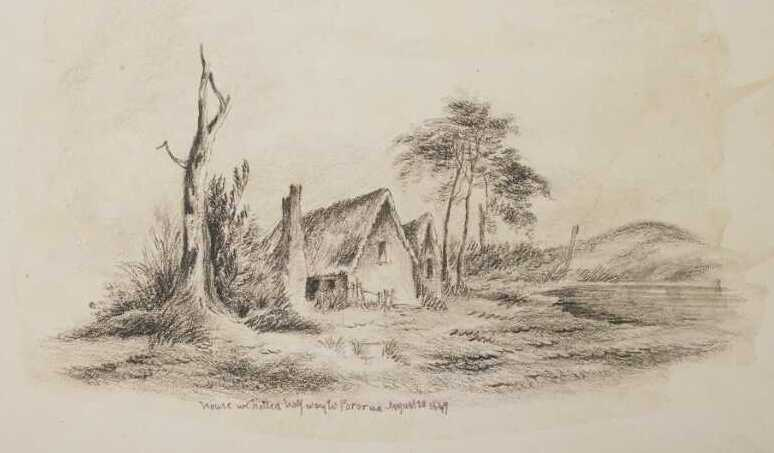
The Halfway House in 1849 by Martha King

A halfway house is a place for travellers to rest, usually halfway between two settlements. A Halfway house was built in 1841 by Anthony and Susannah Wall. The Halfway was the halfway resting-place for travellers journeying between Wellington and Porirua along a Maori trail. The route this trail traversed from Kaiwharawhara to Porirua was to be modified and enlarged and become known as the Porirua Road.

== Maori trail and Old Porirua Road ==
The development of the Old Porirua Road north of The Halfway halted at The Halfway due to tension between the Government Administrators and Ngāti Toa. The issues for Ngāti Toa involved questionable land purchases by Colonel Wakefield of the New Zealand Company before the signing of the Treaty of Waitangi in 1840. This resulted in the Wairau Affray (1843), the Boulcott Farm hostilities in the Hutt Valley (1846) and the skirmish at Battle Hill (1846).

== World War II Anti-tank trap ==
There are remains of a WW2 Tank trap, on private land near Middleton Road. At the time of building this trap the road was known as "Porirua Road". This road was the only road between Wellington and Porirua. Remnants of the tank traps were rediscovered by railway workers in 2008.

== Public works camp and construction plant ==
A public works camp was built at Glenside to house workers building the Tawa Flat deviation of the North Island Main Trunk railway, constructed from 1924 to 1937. The northern portal of the long No 2 tunnel is at Glenside.

The remains of a rock crusher remain in Rowells Road, Glenside, and can be seen from Middleton Road. Crushed rock from the crusher was used for the foundations of the railway deviation, and remains of the rock crusher form part of Rowells Road.

== Demographics ==
Glenside-Churton Park East covers 2.48 km^{2} (0.96 sq mi) and had an estimated population of 610 as of June 2025, with a population density of 246 people per km^{2}. The demographics are included at Churton Park#Demographics.

Historical population
Year	Pop.	±% p.a.
2013	348	—
2018	396	+2.62%
2023	471	+3.53%

Glenside-Churton Park East had a population of 471 in the 2023 New Zealand census, an increase of 75 people (18.9%) since the 2018 census, and an increase of 123 people (35.3%) since the 2013 census. There were 225 males, 243 females, and 3 people of other genders in 198 dwellings. 3.8% of people identified as LGBTIQ+. The median age was 37.1 years (compared with 38.1 years nationally). There were 93 people (19.7%) aged under 15 years, 84 (17.8%) aged 15 to 29, 255 (54.1%) aged 30 to 64, and 39 (8.3%) aged 65 or older.

People could identify as more than one ethnicity. The results were 54.8% European (Pākehā); 5.1% Māori; 5.7% Pasifika; 37.6% Asian; 4.5% Middle Eastern, Latin American and African New Zealanders (MELAA); and 3.8% other, which includes people giving their ethnicity as "New Zealander". English was spoken by 95.5%, Māori by 2.5%, Samoan by 1.3%, and other languages by 29.9%. No language could be spoken by 1.9% (e.g. too young to talk). New Zealand Sign Language was known by 0.6%. The percentage of people born overseas was 40.1, compared with 28.8% nationally.

Religious affiliations were 32.5% Christian, 7.0% Hindu, 0.6% Islam, 3.2% Buddhist, 1.3% New Age, 0.6% Jewish, and 2.5% other religions. People who answered that they had no religion were 45.9%, and 4.5% of people did not answer the census question.

Of those at least 15 years old, 177 (46.8%) people had a bachelor's or higher degree, 156 (41.3%) had a post-high school certificate or diploma, and 51 (13.5%) people exclusively held high school qualifications. The median income was $68,200, compared with $41,500 nationally. 111 people (29.4%) earned over $100,000 compared to 12.1% nationally. The employment status of those at least 15 was 255 (67.5%) full-time, 42 (11.1%) part-time, and 6 (1.6%) unemployed.
