= 2025 Wellington City Council election =

Elections in New Zealand

- 11 October 2025
- Turnout: 81,574 (50.57% ▲5.03 pp)
- Mayor
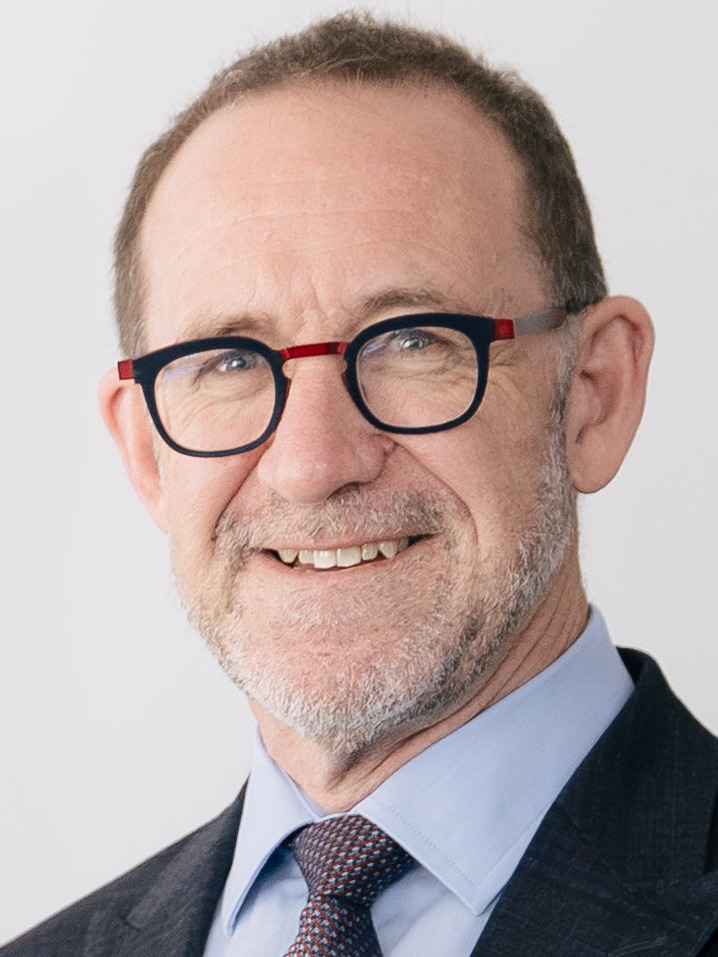

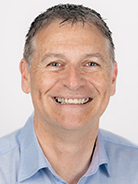

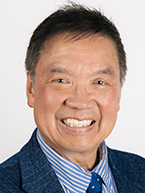

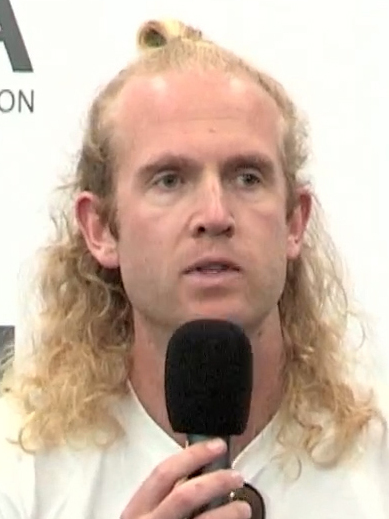

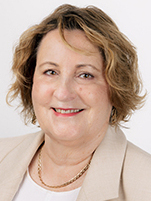
Candidate	Andrew Little	Karl Tiefenbacher	Ray Chung
Party	Labour	Independent	Independent Together
Primary vote	46,016	11,494	8,532
Percentage	56.41%	14.09%	10.46%
Candidate	Alex Baker	Diane Calvert
Party	Independent	Independent
Primary vote	7,506	4,093
Percentage	9.20%	5.02%
Mayor before election
Tory Whanau
Green
Elected mayor
Andrew Little
Labour
- Councillors
- 15 seats on the governing body of Wellington City Council; 8 seats needed for a majority
Party	Vote %	Seats	+/–
Independent	36.68	5	−3
Labour	29.21	5	+1
Green	20.37	4	+1
Independent Together	10.33	1	+1
This lists parties that won seats. See the complete results below.
Control before	Control after
No majority	No majority

The 2025 Wellington City Council election was a local election held from 9 September to 11 October in Wellington, New Zealand, as part of that year's territorial authority elections and other local elections held nation-wide.

Voters elected the mayor of Wellington, 15 city councillors, and other local representatives for the 2025–2028 term of the Wellington City Council. Postal voting and the single transferable vote voting system were used.

Incumbent mayor Tory Whanau ultimately did not run for re-election as mayor, instead running to be the Māori ward councillor. Whanau lost that election to Labour's Matthew Reweti.

Overall turnout was 49.99%, the highest in 30 years, with former Labour leader Andrew Little winning the mayoralty in a landslide.

The council introduced a Māori ward at the 2022 election; in a referendum on its future held at this election (as part of a nation-wide series of referendums) voters elected to keep the Māori ward.

== Key dates ==
- 4 July 2025: Nominations for candidates opened
- 1 August 2025: Nominations for candidates closed at 12 pm
- 9 September 2025: Voting documents were posted and voting opened
- 11 October 2025: Voting closed at 12 pm and progress/preliminary results were published
- 16–19 October 2025: Final results were declared.

== Background ==
=== Positions up for election ===
Voters in the city elected the mayor of Wellington, 15 city councillors in 6 wards, and the members of two community boards (Tawa and Mākara / Ōhāriu). They also elected 8 members of the Greater Wellington Regional Council. (Note: 5 councillors representing the city exclusively.; 2 councillors representing parts of the city and parts of neighbouring Porirua City.; 1 Māori constituency councillor representing the wider region.)

=== Māori wards referendum ===
In May 2021, the Wellington City Council voted 13–2 to establish a Māori ward, with the Te Whanganui-a-Tara Māori ward first contested in the 2022 elections.

In July 2024, the National-led coalition government passed the Local Government (Electoral Legislation and Māori Wards and Māori Constituencies) Amendment Act 2024 which reinstated the requirement that councils must hold a referendum before establishing Māori wards or constituencies. In September 2024, the council voted 13–3 to affirm their decision to establish the Māori constituency, thereby triggering a referendum on the constituency to be held alongside the 2025 local elections.

=== Airport shares ===
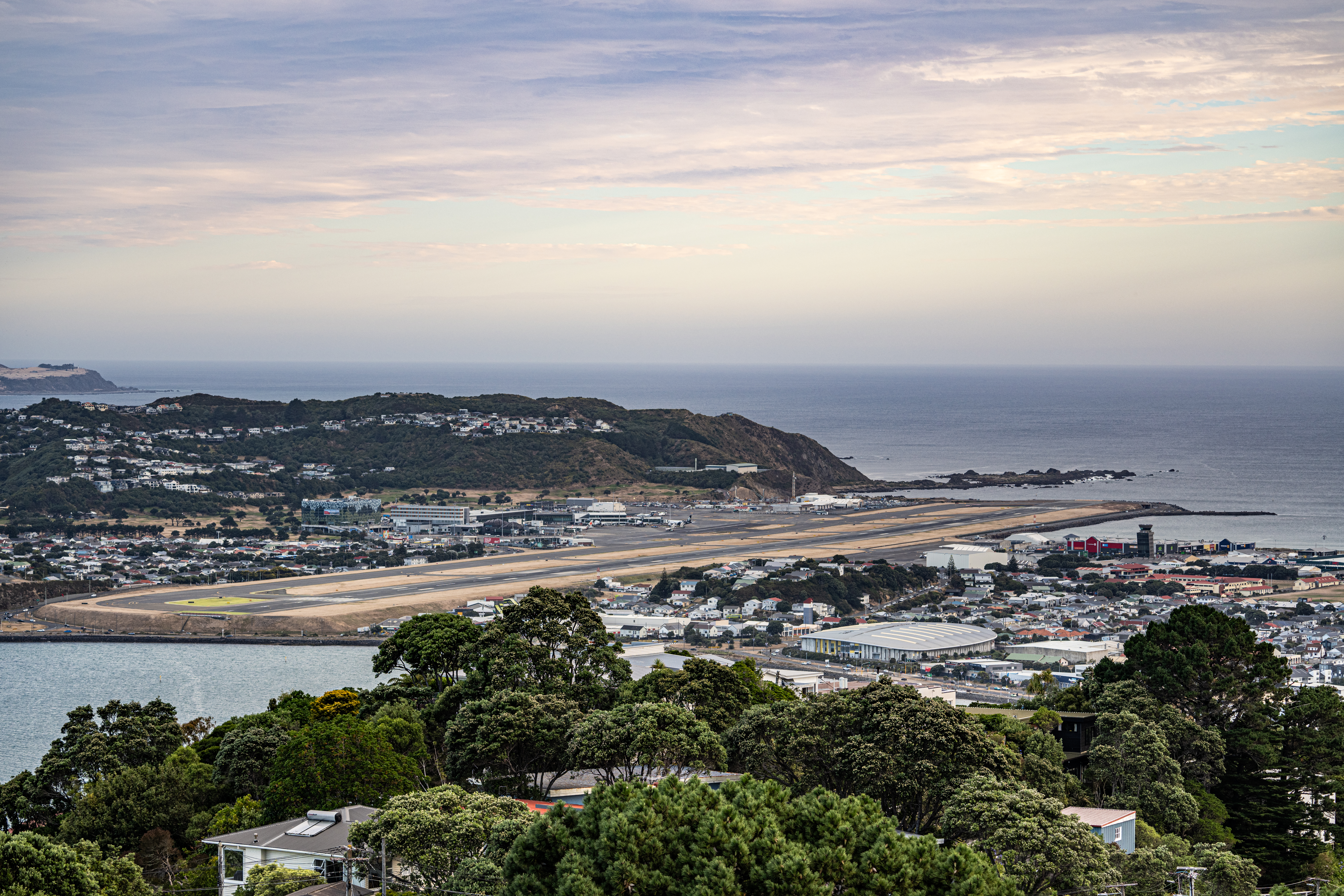
Wellington Airport

In October 2023, the council's Long-term Plan, Finance, and Performance Committee, which comprised all members of the council and was chaired by Labour councillor Rebecca Matthews, proposed a sale of the council's 34% stake in the Wellington Airport as a part of the council's long-term plan. The proceeds of the sale would go on to establish an Investment fund for use in the case of a natural disaster.

On 30 May 2024 the Council voted 8–8, with Mayor Whanau casting the tie-breaking vote, to sell its stake in the airport. Green Mayor and Deputy Mayor, Whanau and Laurie Foon voted in favour of the sale despite the Green Party running on retaining public ownership of the airport shares. The sale was opposed by all of the Labour councillors, independent councillors; Ray Chung and Iona Pannett and Green councillors Geordie Rodgers and Nīkau Wi Neera.

The sale caused a rift in the Green Party with Wi Neera and Rodgers voting against it. Green MP for Wellington Central and former Councillor, Tamatha Paul opposed the sale saying that opposition to privatisation was “fundamental” to Green principles and that any Green councillor who voted in favour of the sale would “undermine the credibility” of the party. The Green Party's 2022 constitution outlined opposition to selling shares and Green MP for Rongotai, Julie Anne Genter stated that she supported public ownership of infrastructure as a “general principle” but that the council was in tricky position. The sale of shares was unpopular with Wellington Unions and the general public. Before the sale occurred, a poll, commissioned by Unions Wellington, found that 74% of respondents opposed the sale, 51.4% of respondents said they would be less likely to vote for a councillor who voted for the sale and that a majority of supporters of all political parties in parliament except ACT opposed the sale.

On 12 August 2024, a majority of councillors signed a notice of revocation, attempting to overturn the vote. The notice was signed by councillors who had previously voted against the sale except for Green councillor Rogers and Labour councillor Matthews. Independent councillors, Diane Calvert, Nicola Young and Tony Randle changed their decision and signed the notice. The notice however was overturned as invalid.

In September, the council's chief executive confirmed another vote would be held on the 10th of October. The vote went 9–7 in favour for holding the shares and was voted for by those who had signed the earlier notice of revocation.

Votes on Sale of Shares
Role	Member	30 May Vote	12 August Notice of Revocation	9 October Vote
Mayor	Tory Whanau	Sell Shares		Sell Shares
Deputy Mayor	Laurie Foon	Sell Shares		Sell Shares
Councillors	Geordie Rodgers	Hold Shares		Sell Shares
Councillors	Nīkau Wi Neera	Hold Shares	Signatory	Hold Shares
Councillors	John Apanowicz	Sell Shares		Sell Shares
Councillors	Tim Brown	Sell Shares		Sell Shares
Councillors	Sarah Free	Sell Shares		Sell Shares
Councillors	Diane Calvert	Sell Shares	Signatory	Hold Shares
Councillors	Nicola Young	Sell Shares	Signatory	Hold Shares
Councillors	Tony Randle	Sell Shares	Signatory	Hold Shares
Councillors	Ray Chung	Hold Shares	Signatory	Hold Shares
Councillors	Iona Pannett	Hold Shares	Signatory	Hold Shares
Councillors	Rebecca Matthews	Hold Shares		Sell Shares
Councillors	Ben McNulty	Hold Shares	Signatory	Hold Shares
Councillors	Teri O'Neill	Hold Shares	Signatory	Hold Shares
Councillors	Nureddin Abdurahman	Hold Shares	Signatory	Hold Shares
Results		(8–8) Sell Shares	(9–7) Hold Shares	(9–7) Hold Shares

Following the failure of the airport shares sale and the council's decision to pay for water infrastructure through up-front rates rather than debt financing, Minister of Local Government, Simeon Brown appointed a crown observer to the council.

== Campaign ==
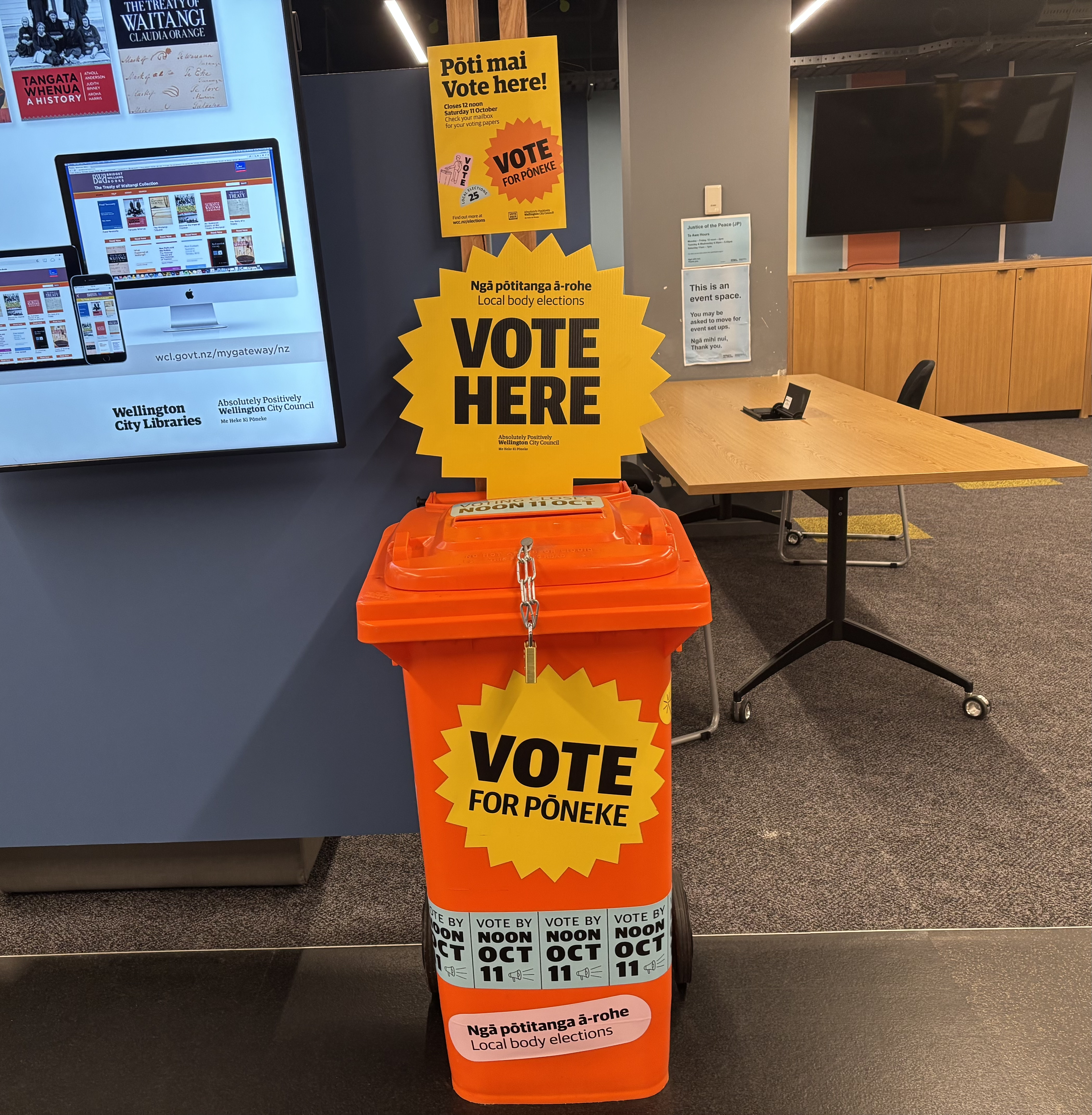
Voting bin used during the election

=== Mayor ===
Incumbent mayor Tory Whanau had announced she would run for a second term, but later changed her mind after Andrew Little entered the race. Ray Chung would contest the election as the candidate from the Independent Together group.

Other candidates looking to contest the mayoralty included business owner Karl Tiefenbacher, former Wellington LIVE media owner Graham Bloxham, conservationist Kelvin Hastie, former city councillor Rob Goulden, and former chartered accountant Alex Baker.

A campaign parodying Independent Together was launched in June 2025, featuring "Pennywize the Rewilding Clown" for mayor, with a campaign website that closely parodied that of the Independent Together website. The parody played on the character from Stephen King's horror franchise It.

=== ACT Local ===
On 18 March, ACT announced they would run candidates in local elections for the first time. ACT's candidates would oppose attempts to manage carbon emissions at the local level.

On 26 July ACT announced three candidates for the Wellington City Council; Ray Bowden, for the Wharangi/Onslow-Western Ward, Mark Flynn for the Takapu/Northern ward and Luke Kuggeleijn for the Motukairangi/Eastern ward.

=== Green ===
On 7 April, the Green Party announced incumbent Mayor Tory Whanau and councillors Laurie Foon and Geordie Rogers would seek re-election and newcomer Jonny Osborne would be running for council in the Motukairangi/Eastern ward. It was not announced whether incumbent councillor for the Māori ward, Nīkau Wi Neera would run again.

On 29 April, after Labour's Andrew Little announced his candidacy for mayor, Whanau announced she would pull out of the mayoral race and would run for council in the Māori ward. Incumbent councillor Wi Neera announced he would not be seeking re-election.

On 6 May incumbent councillor Rebecca Matthews announced she would be seeking re-election as a Green party candidate after leaving the Labour Party.

=== Independent Together ===
Independent together was launched to contest the election on 13 April 2025 with incumbent councilor Ray Chung as their mayoral candidate.The group is fiscally conservative (with their key policy being zero rates increases in the upcoming term) and they oppose party politics on council. Alongside Chung's mayoral candidacy he ran to retain his current seat if not elected to the mayoralty. Eight other candidates ran for councillor positions.

Independent Together has strong ties to right wing group Better Wellington. Internet Data revealed that Independent Together and Chung's campaign websites were hosted on the same server as websites for right wing groups Better Wellington and Resistance Kiwi, and the organisers of an anti-transgender rally, Inflection Point NZ. The websites were set up and managed by right-wing political operative and pro-whaling lobbyist Glenn Inwood. Inwood previously formulated and spread false rumours of the existence of a sexually compromising video of Tory Whanau, incumbent mayor of Wellington. Independent Together's ads were authorised by Better Wellington's Paul Heffernan and Chung's campaign manager was Better Wellington spokesperson Alistair Boyce. Independent Together's policy pillars were formulated by Chung, Inwood, Boyce and Heffernan in consultation with Better Wellington members.

==== Better Wellington dossier on Labour-aligned candidates ====
The Independent Together-linked campaign group Better Wellington was revealed to have compiled a dossier on Labour candidates in July.

==== Chung email scandal ====
An email sent by Chung to three other councillors in which he spread a rumour about a sexual encounter between mayor Whanau and a third party was released in July. The email was broadly condemned by Chung's opponents, as well as Prime Minister Christopher Luxon and Leader of the Opposition Chris Hipkins.

The three councillors that received the email were Tony Randle, Nicola Young and John Apanowicz. Young told the New Zealand Herald that she told Chung the email was "unwise and tawdry" at the time. Randle said, with regards to the rumour in the email, that "people should be held accountable and in the end you stand as a person whose intentions and character are judged every three years", and that he did not believe the email ruled out Chung as a candidate. Apanowicz said he did not recall receiving the email, but that the rumours about mayor Whanau "upset" him.

A campaign event following the scandal erupted into chaos, as opponents of Chung made up a considerable minority of those in attendance at the event hosted in The Grand on Courtenay Place in the city centre.

=== Labour ===
On 16 March, the Labour Party announced that incumbent councillors Ben McNulty and Nureddin Abdurahman would seek re-election and that Afnan Al-Rubayee would run again in the Pukehīnau/Lambton ward. After a party vote on 6 April, the party announced three more candidates; Matthew Reweti would again run for the Māori ward, Joy Gribben for the Wharangi/Onslow-Westernward and Sam O'Brien for the Motukairangi/Eastern ward. Incumbent councillor Rebecca Matthews was not confirmed for nomination and would leave the Labour party and instead run for reelection under the Green party.

Labour was initially unable to find a mayoral candidate and extended the period of nominations for the role. The party's president and former city councillor Jill Day and former mayor Justin Lester were approached for the candidacy but declined, although Lester did not completely rule it out. Former leader of the Labour Party Andrew Little announced in April that he was considering running. On the 16th he announced he was seeking the Labour nomination and he was confirmed on the 28th.

== Candidates ==
=== Incumbents not seeking re-election ===
- Tim Brown, councillor for the Motukairangi/Eastern ward since 2022
- Sarah Free, councillor for the Motukairangi/Eastern ward since 2013, instead stood for the Greater Wellington Regional Council
- Teri O'Neill, councillor for the Motukairangi/Eastern ward since 2019
- Iona Pannett, councillor for the Pukehīnau/Lambton since 2007
- Tory Whanau, not seeking re-election as mayor, but seeking election as a councillor for the Te Whanganui-a-Tara Māori Ward.
- Nīkau Wi Neera, councillor for the Te Whanganui-a-Tara Māori ward since 2022

=== Mayor ===
Tory Whanau was initially the Green candidate but later changed to run for the city's Māori ward instead. Andrew Little would run as the Labour candidate as the main centre-left candidate, against a field of mainly right-of-centre challengers. Ray Chung would run as the mayoral candidate for the Independent Together ticket. From the withdrawal of Whanau until councillor Diane Calvert announced, there were no female candidates announced.

=== Councillors ===
==== Te Whanganui-a-Tara Māori ward ====
Te Whanganui a Tara Māori ward returned one councillor to the city council.

Candidate	Photo	Affiliation (Note: A candidate may leave their affiliation blank, run as an independent, or run with an affiliation to an organisation, local body ticket, political party, whānau, hapū, or iwi.)	Notes
Te Paea Paringatai		None	
Matthew Reweti		Labour	Previously ran in 2022
Tory Whanau		Green	Incumbent mayor since 2022, was seeking election in the Te Whanganui-a-Tara Māori Ward in 2025.

==== Takapū/Northern General ward ====
The Takapū/Northern General ward returned three councillors to the city council.

Candidate	Photo	Affiliation	Notes
John Apanowicz		A Voice for Wellington	Incumbent councillor since 2022
Andrea Compton		Smart spending. Strong future.	Previously an Independent Together candidate
Mark Flynn		ACT Local	IT professional
Michael Hill		Independent	
Ben McNulty		Labour	Incumbent councillor since 2022
Tony Randle		Independent – no party affiliation	Incumbent councillor since 2022
Joan Shi		Independent	Previously ran in the 2024 Pukehīnau/Lambton ward by-election. Also ran for mayor.

==== Wharangi/Onslow-Western General ward ====
The Wharangi/Onslow-Western General ward returned three councillors to the city council.

Candidate	Photo	Affiliation	Notes
Ray Bowden		ACT Local	Senior technology consultant
Lily Brown		Independent: Bring Back the Positivity	2023 ACT candidate for Mana. Previously an Independent Together candidate, left the group to run as an independent.
Diane Calvert		Not Affiliated	Incumbent councillor since 2016 Also ran for mayor.
Ray Chung		Independent Together	Incumbent councillor since 2022. Also ran for mayor.
Joy Gribben		Labour	Former senior press-secretary to Jacinda Ardern
Kelvin Hastie		Independent	Also ran for mayor
Rebecca Matthews		Green	Incumbent councillor since 2019, previously as a Labour candidate
Guy Nunns		Independent Together	

==== Pukehīnau/Lambton General ward ====
The Pukehīnau/Lambton General ward returned three councillors to the city council.

Candidate	Photo	Affiliation	Notes
Afnan Al-Rubayee		Labour	Former refugee. Previously ran for council in 2019.
Rodney Barber		Independent for Public Value	Chartered accountant and former Treasury official
Tony De Lorenzo		Independent	Business owner and manager
Zan Rai Gyaw		Residents-Only Voting	Previously ran in 2022 and in the 2024 Pukehīnau/Lambton ward by-election
David Lee		Let's Get Wellington Working	Former councillor (2013–2019), and incumbent Greater Wellington regional councillor for the Pōneke/Wellington constituency since 2019
Teal Mau		None	Former refugee, hairdresser and former My Kitchen Rules contestant
Dan Milward		Independent – Go Forward with Milward	Video game developer. Previously an Independent Together candidate
Geordie Rogers		Green	Incumbent councillor since 2024 by-election
Tim Ward		None	Founder of music venue San Fran, and other hospitality ventures
Stuart Wong		Independent Together	Business owner
Nicola Young		Independent – for an affordable city	Incumbent councillor since 2013

==== Motukairangi/Eastern General ward ====
The Motukairangi/Eastern General ward returned three councillors to the city council.

Candidate	Photo	Affiliation	Notes
Ken Ah Kuoi		Independent Together	Lawyer and former Education Review Officer
Alex Baker		Independent	Former chartered accountant, also ran for mayor
Chris Calvi-Freeman		Independent – Working for the East	Former councillor (2016–2019)
Trish Given		Independent	Former Wellington City Council employee (2022–24)
Rob Goulden		My Vision for the City 2050	Former councillor. Also ran for mayor.
Luke Kuggeleijn		ACT Local	Biomedical science graduate, triathlete and surf lifeguard
Michelle McGuire		Independent Together	
Thomas Morgan		Very Independent	
Sam O'Brien		Labour	Environmental policy advisor for GWRC
Jonny Osborne		Green	Public policy expert and commentator.
Karl Tiefenbacher		Independent	Businessman and founder of icecream brand Kaffee Eis. Also ran for mayor.

==== Paekawakawa/Southern General ward ====
The Paekawakawa/Southern General ward returned two councillors to the city council.

Candidate	Photo	Affiliation	Notes
Nureddin Abdurahman		Labour	Incumbent councillor since 2022
Laurie Foon		Green	Incumbent deputy mayor and councillor since 2019
Donald McDonald		Mcdone waiting 2coming terms Passover	Also ran for mayor. Previously ran for mayor in 2019 and 2022.
Paula Muollo		Independent Together	
Mike Petrie		From the Fringe to the Frontline	Previously an Independent Together candidate
Kevin Zeng		Independent – for business environment	Publisher of Home Voice, a Wellington-based Chinese-language newspaper

== Results ==
Turnout in the election was 49.99%, the highest turnout in 30 years, with 81,574 voting papers returned.

=== Composition ===
Ward	Previous	Elected
Mayor	Tory Whanau (Note: Whanau ran as an independent in 2022 but rejoined the Green party in October 2024)	Andrew Little
Te Whanganui-a-Tara Māori	Nīkau Wi-Neera^{R}	Matthew Reweti
Motukairangi/Eastern	Sarah Free^{R}	Karl Tiefenbacher
Motukairangi/Eastern	Teri O'Neill^{R}	Sam O'Brien
Motukairangi/Eastern	Tim Brown^{R}	Jonny Osborne
Pukehīnau/Lambton	Iona Pannett^{R}	Geordie Rogers
Pukehīnau/Lambton	Nicola Young	Afnan Al-Rubayee
Pukehīnau/Lambton	Geordie Rogers	Nicola Young
Takapū/Northern	Ben McNulty	Ben McNulty
Takapū/Northern	Tony Randle	Tony Randle
Takapū/Northern	John Apanowicz	Andrea Compton
Wharangi/Onslow-Western	Diane Calvert	Diane Calvert
Wharangi/Onslow-Western	Rebecca Matthews	Rebecca Matthews
Wharangi/Onslow-Western	Ray Chung	Ray Chung
Paekawakawa/Southern	Laurie Foon	Nureddin Abdurahman
Paekawakawa/Southern	Nureddin Abdurahman	Laurie Foon
^{R} retired

=== Mayor ===
Former Labour leader Andrew Little won the mayoralty in a landslide. Businessman Karl Tiefenbacher came in second, with councillor Ray Chung in third place.

2025 Wellington mayoral election
Party	Candidate	Primary votes	%	±%	Iteration	
Party	Candidate	Primary votes	%	±%	#	Votes
Labour	Andrew Little	46,016	56.41	(new)	1st	46,016
Independent	Karl Tiefenbacher	11,494	14.09	(new)	1st	11,494
Independent Together	Ray Chung	8,534	10.46	−3.75	1st	8,534
Independent	Alex Baker	7,506	9.20	(new)	1st	7,506
Independent	Diane Calvert	4,093	5.02	(new)	1st	4,093
Independent	Kelvin Hastie	954	1.17	−1.53	1st	954
Independent	Rob Goulden	893	1.09	(new)	1st	893
Independent	Joan Ahi	459	0.56	(new)	1st	459
Independent	William Pennywize	364	0.45	(new)	1st	364
Independent	Scott Caldwell	295	0.36	(new)	1st	295
Silly Hat	Josh Harford	270	0.33	(new)	1st	270
Independent	Donald McDonald	253	0.31	−0.22	1st	253
Quota		40,566	49.73	+0.44		
Informal votes		120	0.15	+0.01		
Blank votes		323	0.40	−0.26		
Turnout		81,574	50.57	+5.03		
Registered electors		161,318				
Labour gain from Independent Green on 1st iteration						

=== Takapū/Northern general ward ===
2025 Takapū/Northern general ward election
Party	Candidate	Primary votes	%	±%	Iteration	
Party	Candidate	Primary votes	%	±%	#	Votes
Labour	Ben McNulty^{†}	8,601	52.25	+35.39	1st	8,601
Independent	Tony Randle^{†}	2,136	12.98	−2.98	6th	4,173
Independent	Andrew Compton	1,458	8.86	(new)	8th	3,313
Independent	John Apanowicz^{†}	1,143	6.94	−7.21	8th	3,176
ACT Local	Mark Flynn	1,698	10.32	(new)	5th	2,087
Independent	Michael Hill	561	3.41	(new)	4th	981
Independent	Joan Shi	480	2.92	(new)	3rd	794
Quota		4,019	24.42	+0.46		
Informal votes		61	0.37	+0.10		
Blank votes		322	1.96	−1.63		
Turnout		16,460	46.55	+5.60		
Registered electors		35,362				
Labour hold on 1st iteration						
Independent hold on 6th iteration						
Independent gain from Independent on 8th iteration						
^{†} incumbent

=== Wharangi/Onslow-Western general ward ===
2025 Wharangi/Onslow-Western general ward election
Party	Candidate	Primary votes	%	±%	Iteration	
Party	Candidate	Primary votes	%	±%	#	Votes
Independent	Diane Calvert^{†}	5,368	26.92	+6.82	1st	5,368
Green	Rebecca Matthews^{†}	4,437	22.25	+4.96	5th	4,876
Independent Together	Ray Chung^{†}	2,813	14.11	−9.65	9th	4,496
Labour	Joy Gribben	2,992	15.00	(new)	9th	4,452
Independent	Lily Brown	1,331	6.67	(new)	5th	1,947
Independent	Kelvin Hastie	1,207	6.05	−0.92	4th	1,411
ACT Local	Ray Bowden	735	3.69	(new)	3rd	838
Independent Together	Guy Nunns	718	3.60	(new)	2nd	738
Quota		4,900	24.57	+0.32		
Informal votes		51	0.26	−0.04		
Blank votes		289	1.45	−0.79		
Turnout		19,941	58.82	+6.30		
Registered electors		33,904				
Independent hold on 1st iteration						
Green gain from Labour on 5th iteration						
Independent Together gain from Independent on 9th iteration						
^{†} incumbent

=== Pukehīnau/Lambton general ward ===
2025 Pukehīnau/Lambton general ward election
Party	Candidate	Primary votes	%	±%	Iteration	
Party	Candidate	Primary votes	%	±%	#	Votes
Green	Geordie Rogers^{†}	4,445	31.45	(new)	1st	4,445
Labour	Afnan Al-Rubayee	2,701	19.11	+11.69	4th	3,423
Independent	Nicola Young^{†}	2,496	17.66	+1.66	9th	3,711
Independent	Tim Ward	1,247	8.82	(new)	9th	2,215
Independent	Dan Milward	970	6.86	(new)	8th	1,472
Independent	David Lee	588	4.16	(new)	7th	874
Independent	Rodney Barber	490	3.47	(new)	6th	576
Independent Together	Stuart Wong	363	2.57	(new)	5th	387
Independent	Teal Mau	263	1.86	(new)	4th	291
Independent	Tony De Lorenzo	167	1.18	(new)	3rd	178
Independent	Zan Rai Gyaw	39	0.28	−0.27	2nd	39
Quota		3,442	24.35	+0.28		
Informal votes		67	0.47	+0.16		
Blank votes		298	2.11	+0.09		
Turnout		14,134	44.66	+4.29		
Registered electors		31,650				
Green hold on 1st iteration						
Labour gain from Independent on 4th iteration						
Independent hold on 9th iteration						
^{†} incumbent

=== Motukairangi/Eastern general ward ===
2025 Motukairangi/Eastern general ward election
Party	Candidate	Primary votes	%	±%	Iteration	
Party	Candidate	Primary votes	%	±%	#	Votes
Independent	Karl Tiefenbacher	3,467	23.20	(new)	4th	3,665
Labour	Sam O'Brien	2,583	17.29	(new)	9th	3,824
Green	Jonny Osborne	1,972	13.20	(new)	10th	3,422
Independent Together	Ken Ah Kuoi	1,803	12.07	+4.05	10th	2,907
Independent	Alex Baker	1,477	9.89	(new)	8th	1,955
Independent	Chris Calvi-Freeman	947	6.34	(new)	7th	1,251
Independent	Trish Given	998	6.68	(new)	6th	1,070
ACT Local	Luke Kuggeleijn	522	3.49	(new)	4th	572
Independent	Rob Goulden	445	2.98	−1.43	3rd	467
Independent Together	Michelle McGuire	323	2.16	(new)	2nd	324
Independent	Thomas G. P. Morgan	56	0.37	(new)	1st	56
Quota		3,648	24.42	+0.49		
Informal votes		77	0.52	−0.18		
Blank votes		271	1.81	−1.43		
Turnout		14,941	52.38	+4.96		
Registered electors		28,526				
Independent gain from Independent on 4th iteration						
Labour hold on 9th iteration						
Green gain from Independent on 10th iteration						

=== Paekawakawa/Southern general ward ===
2025 Paekawakawa/Southern general ward election
Party	Candidate	Primary votes	%	±%	Iteration	
Party	Candidate	Primary votes	%	±%	#	Votes
Labour	Nureddin Abdurahman^{†}	4,723	35.61	+15.81	1st	4,723
Green	Laurie Foon^{†}	4,687	35.34	−0.06	1st	4,687
Independent Together	Paula Muollo	2,379	17.94	+4.93	1st	2,379
Independent	Kevin Zeng	626	4.72	(new)	1st	626
Independent	Mike Petrie	450	3.39	(new)	1st	450
Independent	Donald McDonald	100	0.75	(new)	1st	100
Quota		4,322	32.58	+0.50		
Informal votes		60	0.45	+0.03		
Blank votes		239	1.80	−0.87		
Turnout		13,264	52.26	+2.31		
Registered electors		25,383				
Labour hold on 1st iteration						
Green hold on 1st iteration						
^{†} incumbent

=== Te Whanganui-a-Tara Māori ward ===
2025 Te Whanganui-a-Tara Māori ward election
Party	Candidate	Primary votes	%	±%	Iteration	
Party	Candidate	Primary votes	%	±%	#	Votes
Labour	Matthew Reweti	1,258	44.39	+8.19	2nd	1,502
Green	Tory Whanau	1,016	35.85	(new)	2nd	1,148
Independent	Te Paea Paringatai	492	17.36	(new)	1st	492
Quota		1,383	48.80	+1.67		
Informal votes		12	0.42	+0.05		
Blank votes		56	1.98	−2.69		
Turnout		2,834	43.65	+11.18		
Registered electors		6,493				
Labour gain from Green on 2nd iteration						

=== Te Whanganui-a-Tara Māori ward ===
Choice	Votes	%
I vote to KEEP Māori wards	10,790	57.57
I vote to REMOVE Māori wards	7,952	42.43
Total	18,742	100.00
Valid votes	18,742	91.51
Invalid votes	12	0.06
Blank votes	1,727	8.43
Total votes	20,481	100.00
Registered voters/turnout	43,664	46.91
Source: electionz.com & MCERT

== See also ==
- 2025 Greater Wellington Regional Council election
- 2025 Porirua City Council election
- 2025 Upper Hutt City Council election
- 2025 Hutt City Council election
- 2025 Kāpiti Coast District Council election
