= 1995 Wellington City Council election =

Local election in New Zealand

- 14 October 1995

All 18 ward seats on the Wellington City Council
	First party	Second party
Party	Citizens'	Labour
Last election	6	5
Seats won	4	2
Seat change	▼2	▼3
Popular vote	44,971	29,532
Percentage	25.16	16.52
	Third party	Fourth party
Party	Green	Alliance
Last election	4	0
Seats won	3	1
Seat change	▼1	▲1
Popular vote	16,983	16,156
Percentage	9.50	9.04
- Results by ward

The 1995 Wellington City Council election was part of the 1995 New Zealand local elections, to elect members to sub-national councils and boards. The polling was conducted using the first-past-the-post electoral method.

== Council ==
The Wellington City Council consisted of a mayor and eighteen councillors elected from five wards (Northern, Western, Tawa, Eastern, Southern).

=== Mayor ===
1995 Wellington mayoral election
Party	Candidate	Votes	%	±%
Independent	Mark Blumsky	26,372	43.99	
Labour	Elizabeth Tennet	11,673	19.47	
Independent	Helene Ritchie	4,569	7.62	−9.38
Citizens'	Nigel Gould	4,482	7.47	
Independent	Michael Wall	3,657	6.10	
Alliance	Phillida Bunkle	3,336	5.56	
Green	Stephen Rainbow	2,797	4.66	−6.05
Independent	Bryan Pepperell	977	1.62	
McGillicuddy Serious	Ross Gardner	470	0.78	
Independent	Noel Galvin	435	0.72	
Independent	Donald Eddie	253	0.42	
Independent	Raymond Berkahn	149	0.24	
Private Enterprise	Frank Moncur	111	0.18	−0.05
Independent	Bruce Harris	107	0.17	
Informal votes		560	0.93	−0.17
Majority		14,699	24.51	
Turnout		59,948	53.10	−0.16
Registered electors		112,886		

=== Eastern Ward ===
The Eastern Ward returned four councillors to the Wellington City Council. The final results for the ward were:

Eastern Ward
Party	Candidate	Votes	%	±%
Independent	Ruth Gotlieb	8,534	71.56	+13.06
Green	Sue Kedgley	7,906	66.29	+9.72
Citizens'	Chris Parkin	5,336	44.74	
Citizens'	Brian Barraclough	5,015	42.05	+2.75
Citizens'	Rama Ramanathan	4,692	39.34	+5.22
Labour	Robin Boldarin	4,464	37.43	
Labour	Barry Ebert	4,054	33.99	
Alliance	Ruby Woodward	3,388	28.41	
Independent	Evan Keay	2,647	22.19	
Private Enterprise	Frank Moncur	1,038	8.70	−0.47
Informal votes		625	5.24	+2.42
Turnout		11,925	42.50	−4.93
Registered electors		28,056		

=== Northern Ward ===
The Northern Ward returned four councillors to the Wellington City Council. The final results for the ward were:

Northern Ward
Party	Candidate	Votes	%	±%
Independent	Mark Blumsky (Note: As Blumsky won the Mayoralty his election to the council was voided and his seat was awarded to the highest polling unsuccessful candidate.)	11,585	76.73	
Independent	Judy Siers	9,291	61.53	
Citizens'	Sally Baber	8,080	53.51	
Citizens'	Allan Johnston	4,711	31.20	
Independent	Kent Clark	3,931	26.03	
Alliance	John Fanning	3,630	24.04	
Citizens'	John Potter	3,541	23.45	
Informal votes		525	3.47	−0.09
Turnout		15,098	56.04	+8.77
Registered electors		26,940		

Table footnotes:

=== Southern Ward ===
The Southern Ward returned four councillors to the Wellington City Council. The final results for the ward were:

Southern Ward
Party	Candidate	Votes	%	±%
Labour	John Gilberthorpe	5,056	57.23	+6.51
Labour	Sue Piper	4,718	53.41	
Green	Celia Wade-Brown	4,571	51.74	+22.13
Green	Stephen Rainbow	4,506	51.01	
Labour	Hola Taue	4,158	47.07	+20.29
Labour	Robert Logan	4,044	45.78	
Independent	Bryan Pepperell	3,264	36.95	+26.15
Alliance	Robert Te Whare	2,229	25.23	
Alliance	Roland Sapsford	2,147	24.30	
Informal votes		638	7.22	+6.74
Turnout		8,833	40.99	−1.45
Registered electors		21,544		

=== Tawa Ward ===
The Tawa Ward returned two councillors to the Wellington City Council. The final results for the ward were:

Tawa Ward
Party	Candidate	Votes	%	±%
Independent	Kerry Prendergast	3,241	69.74	
Independent	Robert Armstrong	2,458	52.89	
Independent	Graeme Sutton	2,233	48.05	
Independent	Roger Bradshaw	1,192	25.65	
Informal votes		170	3.65	
Turnout		4,647	51.31	
Registered electors		9,056		

=== Western Ward ===
The Western Ward returned four councillors to the Wellington City Council. The final results for the ward were:

Western Ward
Party	Candidate	Votes	%	±%
Independent	Andy Foster	6,915	62.43	+26.69
Independent	Rex Nicholls	5,379	48.56	
Independent	Barbara Nef	5,110	46.13	
Alliance	Stephanie Cook	4,762	42.99	
Citizens'	Patricia Morrison	4,551	41.09	
Citizens'	Bryan Weyburne	4,527	40.87	−0.18
Citizens'	Jack Ruben	4,518	40.79	
Independent	Craig Wylie	3,274	29.56	
Labour	Frank Mackinnon	3,038	27.43	+5.47
Independent	Bruce Harris	1,015	9.16	
Informal votes		1,209	10.91	+6.25
Turnout		11,075	40.58	−9.98
Registered electors		27,290		

== Results of the city council election ==
Following the 1995 Wellington City Council election, the composition of the council was as follows:

=== Summary ===
Ward	Previous	Elected
Mayor	Fran Wilde	Mark Blumsky
Eastern Ward	Ruth Gotlieb	Ruth Gotlieb
Eastern Ward	Sue Kedgley	Sue Kedgley
Eastern Ward	Brian Barraclough	Chris Parkin
Eastern Ward	Hazel Armstrong	Brian Barraclough
Lambton Ward	Stephen Rainbow	Ward abolished
Lambton Ward	Liz Thomas	Ward abolished
Lambton Ward	Rex Nicholls	Ward abolished
Northern Ward	Sarah Lysaght	Judy Siers
Northern Ward	Ian Hutchings	Sally Baber
Northern Ward	Ken Boyden	Allan Johnston
Northern Ward	Three seats only	Kent Clark
Onslow Ward	David Bull	Ward abolished
Onslow Ward	Sally Baber	Ward abolished
Southern Ward	Peter Parussini	John Gilberthorpe
Southern Ward	John Gilberthorpe	Sue Piper
Southern Ward	Margaret Bonner	Celia Wade-Brown
Southern Ward	Merrin Downing	Stephen Rainbow
Tawa Ward	Kerry Prendergast	Kerry Prendergast
Tawa Ward	David Watt	Robert Armstrong
Western Ward	Val Bedingfield	Andy Foster
Western Ward	Bryan Weyburne	Rex Nicholls
Western Ward	Andy Foster	Barbara Nef
Western Ward	Three seats only	Stephanie Cook

== Other local elections ==
=== Wellington Regional Council ===
==== North Ward ====
The Wellington North Ward returned two councillors to the Wellington Regional Council.

Wellington North Ward
Party	Candidate	Votes	%	±%
Citizens'	Euan McQueen	12,796	62.59	
Citizens'	Martyn Turner	10,676	52.22	
Independent	Bruce Abernethy	6,738	32.95	
Alliance	Dallas Moore	5,927	28.99	
Alliance	Carrick Lewis	4,750	23.23	
Turnout		20,444	56.79	
Registered electors		35,996		

==== South Ward ====
The Wellington South Ward returned three councillors to the Wellington Regional Council.

Wellington South Ward
Party	Candidate	Votes	%	±%
Labour	Margaret Bonner	12,625	57.54	
Green	Denis Foot	10,953	49.92	
Labour	Terry McDavitt	10,021	45.67	
Independent	Heather Thomson	8,549	38.96	
Citizens'	James Cornish	7,511	34.23	
Green	Craig Palmer	6,628	30.21	
Alliance	Frank Macskasy	6,041	27.53	
Independent	David Hughes	3,487	15.89	
Turnout		21,939	28.53	
Registered electors		76,890		
