= 1998 Wellington City Council election =

Local election in New Zealand

- 10 October 1998

All 18 ward seats on the Wellington City Council
	First party	Second party	Third party
Party	Wellington Alive	Labour	For The Public Interest
Last election	new	4	new
Seats won	7	3	1
Seat change	▲7	▼1	▲1
Popular vote	55,115	24,771	12,139
Percentage	33.40%	15.01%	7.36%
	Fourth party	Fifth party
Party	Green	Alliance
Last election	3	1
Seats won	1	1
Seat change	▼2	0
Popular vote	11,835	5570
Percentage	7.17%	3.38%
- Results by ward

The 1998 Wellington City Council election was part of the 1998 New Zealand local elections, to elect members to sub-national councils and boards. The polling was conducted using the first-past-the-post electoral method.

== Council ==
The Wellington City Council consists of a mayor and eighteen councillors elected from six wards (Eastern, Lambton, Northern, Onslow, Southern, Western).

=== Mayor ===
1998 Wellington mayoral election
Party	Candidate	Votes	%	±%
Wellington Alive	Mark Blumsky	33,828	58.81	+14.82
Alliance	Stephanie Cook	12,918	22.46	
For The Public Interest	Bryan Pepperell	7,402	12.87	+11.25
	Rama Ramanathan	1,381	2.40	
Independent	Hugh Baker-Boyd	1,374	2.38	
Tumeke	Robert Te Whare	609	1.05	
Majority		20,910	36.35	+11.84
Turnout		57,512	48.46	−4.64
Registered electors		118,669		

=== Eastern ward ===
The Eastern ward returns four councillors to the Wellington City Council. The final results for the ward were:

Eastern Ward (4 vacancies)
Party	Candidate	Votes	%	±%
Green	Sue Kedgley	5,914	56.15	−10.14
Independent	Ruth Gotlieb	5,695	54.07	−17.49
Labour	Leonie Gill	4,285	40.68	
Wellington Alive	Rob Goulden	4,050	38.45	
Wellington Alive	Jo Morgan	4,008	38.05	
Labour	Kevin Burrows	3,298	31.31	
Independent	Brian Barraclough	3,214	30.51	−11.54
	Rama Ramanathan	3,098	29.41	−9.93
Labour	Kathy Moe	2,917	27.69	
Wellington People's Resource Centre	Linda Hobman	1,940	18.42	
Independent	Phil Sprey	1,912	18.15	
For The Public Interest	Arthur Attrill	1,798	17.07	
Turnout		10,532	43.03	+0.53
Registered electors		24,474		

=== Lambton ward ===
The Lambton ward returns three councillors to the Wellington City Council. The final results for the ward were:

Lambton Ward (3 vacancies)
Party	Candidate	Votes	%	±%
Independent	Mary Varnham	4,197	47.22	
Alliance	Stephanie Cook	3,971	44.68	
Wellington Alive	Chris Parkin	3,513	39.52	
Wellington Alive	Francine Russell	3,447	38.78	
Wellington Alive	David Simms	3,037	34.17	
Labour	Michael Gibbs	2,488	27.99	
Green	Craig Palmer	2,189	24.63	
For The Public Interest	Alistair Shaw	1,987	22.35	
Legalise Cannabis	Michael Appleby	791	8.90	
	Peter Isaac	604	6.79	
	Rosamund Averton	438	4.92	
Turnout		8,887	39.80	
Registered electors		22,327		

=== Northern ward ===
The Northern ward returns four councillors to the Wellington City Council. The final results for the ward were:

Northern Ward (4 vacancies)
Party	Candidate	Votes	%	±%
Wellington Alive	Kerry Prendergast	6,789	58.41	
Wellington Alive	Robert Armstrong	6,046	52.02	
Wellington Alive	Ian Hutchings	5,403	46.48	+20.26
Independent	Helene Ritchie	4,708	40.50	+15.42
Wellington Alive	Phil Guerin	4,487	38.60	
Independent	Kent Clark	3,027	26.04	+0.01
Independent	Lois Robertson	2,620	22.54	
Independent	Alex Tan	2,610	22.45	
Green	Deirdre Kent	2,268	19.51	
Independent	Roger Bradshaw	2,098	18.05	
For The Public Interest	Vryn Evans	1,612	13.87	
Alliance	Ron England	1,599	13.75	
Independent	Hugh Baker-Boyd	1,238	10.65	
For The Public Interest	John Fourier	1,209	10.40	
Tumeke	Eugene Ryder	772	6.64	
Turnout		11,622	45.73	+4.00
Registered electors		25,411		

=== Onslow ward ===
The Onslow ward returns two councillors to the Wellington City Council. The final results for the ward were:

Onslow Ward (2 vacancies)
Party	Candidate	Votes	%	±%
Independent	Judy Siers	2,981	51.69	
Wellington Alive	Allan Johnston	2,920	50.64	
Wellington Alive	Reece Mead	2,442	42.35	
Citizens Choice	Jack Ruben	1,559	27.03	
For The Public Interest	John Fanning	762	13.21	
Independent	Alexander Schiff	348	6.03	
Citizens Watch	Phillip Rennie	237	4.11	
Tumeke	Matthew Hodgetts	149	2.58	
	Craig Ranapia	134	2.32	
Turnout		5,766	49.66	
Registered electors		11,610		

=== Southern ward ===
The Southern ward returns three councillors to the Wellington City Council. The final results for the ward were:

Southern Ward (3 vacancies)
Party	Candidate	Votes	%	±%
Labour	Sue Piper	4,727	55.96	+2.55
Labour	Alick Shaw	4,304	50.95	
For The Public Interest	Bryan Pepperell	3,358	39.75	+9.24
Labour	Rupert Watson	2,752	32.58	
Wellington Alive	Coleen Singleton	2,658	31.47	
Wellington Alive	Matt Taylor	2,661	31.50	
Independent	Ray Clegg	1,673	19.80	
Green	John Robinson	1,464	17.33	
Your Voice	Maurice Moresi	779	9.22	
Tumeke	Robert Te Whare	653	7.73	−17.50
	Victoria Loisei	308	3.64	
Turnout		8,446	41.51	+4.62
Registered electors		20,345		

=== Western ward ===
The Western ward returns two councillors to the Wellington City Council. The final results for the ward were:

Western Ward (2 vacancies)
Party	Candidate	Votes	%	±%
Independent	Andy Foster	4,059	59.39	−3.04
Wellington Alive	John Morrison	3,654	53.46	
Independent	Barbara Nef	3,564	52.15	+6.02
For The Public Interest	Guy Nunns	1,413	20.67	
Independent	Craig Wylie	564	8.25	−21.31
Tumeke	Beverly Murta	414	6.05	
Turnout		6,834	47.12	+6.54
Registered electors		14,502		

== Results of the city council election ==
Following the 1998 Wellington City Council election, the composition of the council was as follows:

=== Summary ===
Ward	Previous	Elected
Mayor	Mark Blumsky	Mark Blumsky
Eastern Ward	Ruth Gotlieb	Sue Kedgley
Eastern Ward	Sue Kedgley	Ruth Gotlieb
Eastern Ward	Chris Parkin	Leonie Gill
Eastern Ward	Brian Barraclough	Rob Goulden
Lambton Ward	Ward in abbeyance	Mary Varnham
Lambton Ward	Ward in abbeyance	Stephanie Cook
Lambton Ward	Ward in abbeyance	Chris Parkin
Northern Ward	Judy Siers	Kerry Prendergast
Northern Ward	Sally Baber	Robert Armstrong
Northern Ward	Allan Johnston	Ian Hutchings
Northern Ward	Kent Clark	Helene Ritchie
Onslow Ward	Ward in abbeyance	Judy Siers
Onslow Ward	Ward in abbeyance	Allan Johnston
Southern Ward	John Gilberthorpe	Sue Piper
Southern Ward	Sue Piper	Alick Shaw
Southern Ward	Celia Wade-Brown	Bryan Pepperell
Southern Ward	Stephen Rainbow	Three seats only
Tawa Ward	Kerry Prendergast	Ward abolished
Tawa Ward	Robert Armstrong	Ward abolished
Western Ward	Andy Foster	Andy Foster
Western Ward	Rex Nicholls	John Morrison
Western Ward	Stephanie Cook	Two seats only
Western Ward	Stephen Rainbow	Two seats only

== Other local elections ==
=== Wellington Regional Council – Wellington Ward ===
The Wellington ward returns five councillors to the Wellington Regional Council.

Wellington Ward (5 vacancies)
Party	Candidate	Votes	%	±%
Independent	Chris Laidlaw	28,315	65.81	
Labour	Margaret Bonner	23,641	54.95	
Labour	Terry McDavitt	21,770	50.60	
Independent	Euan McQueen	17,692	41.12	
Independent	Michael Gibson	15,722	36.54	
Citizens'	Martyn Turner	15,445	35.90	
Labour	Jim Turner	15,236	35.41	
Green	Toni Atkinson	14,655	34.06	
Labour	Daran Ponter	14,592	33.91	
Citizens'	Bob Henare	13,676	31.79	
Alliance	Tony Simpson	13,083	30.41	
Green	Roland Sapsford	12,063	28.04	
Alliance	Russell Taylor	9,239	21.47	
Turnout				
Registered electors		118,669		
