= Ben McNulty =

Deputy mayor of Wellington, New Zealand

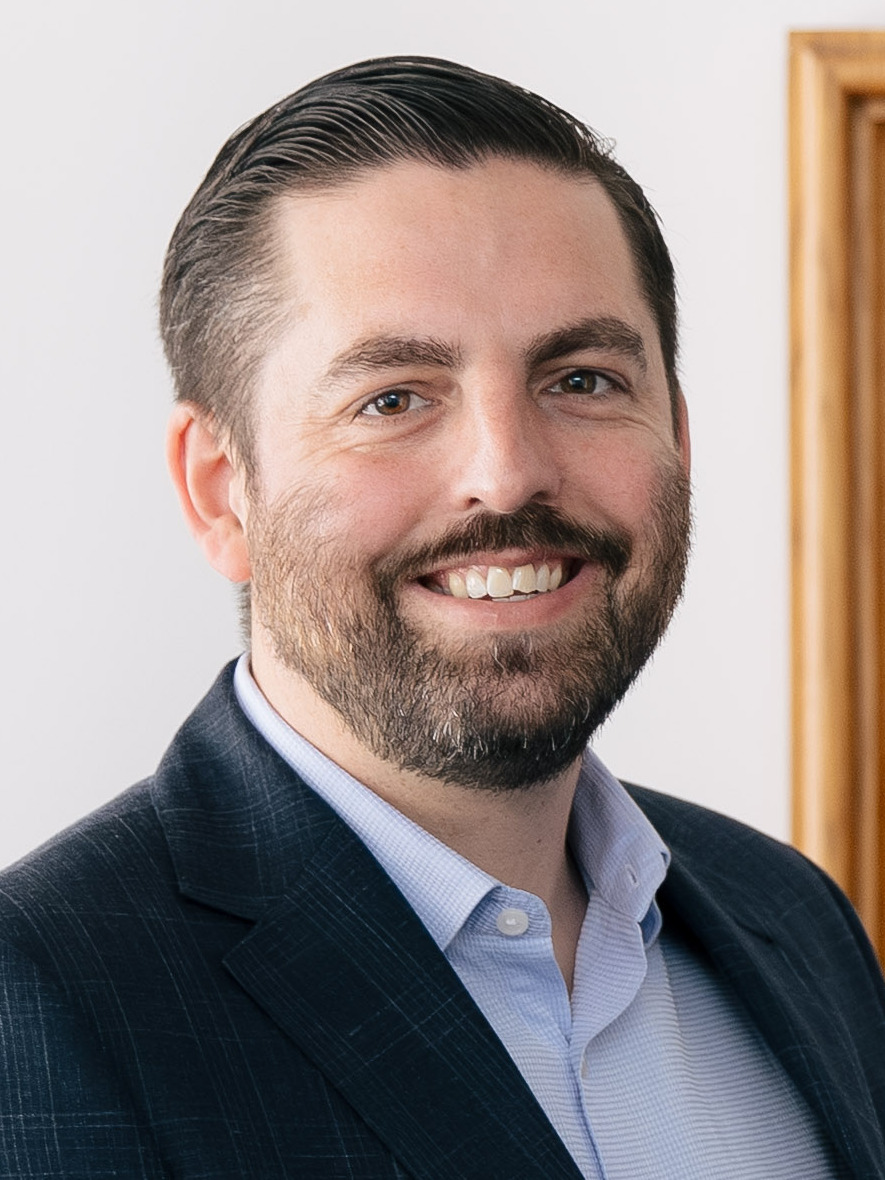
- McNulty in 2025

28th Deputy Mayor of Wellington
- Incumbent
- Assumed office 29 October 2025
- Mayor: Andrew Little
- Preceded by: Laurie Foon

Wellington city councillor for the Takapū/Northern general ward
- Incumbent
- Assumed office 14 October 2022

Personal details
- Born: 1987 or 1988 (age 38–39)
- Party: Labour

Ben McNulty (born 1987 or 1988) is a New Zealand politician who has served as the deputy mayor of Wellington since 29 October 2025. He has represented the Takapū/Northern general ward of the Wellington City Council since 14 October 2022.

== Early life ==
McNulty grew up in Ngaio and attended Onslow College.

McNulty worked in financial services prior to running for office, including marketing, insurance broking, and funds management. He also ran a photography business.

== Wellington city councillor ==
=== 2022 election ===
McNulty first successfully stood for election as one of three councillors representing the Takapū/Northern ward in 2022.

=== 2022–2025 term ===
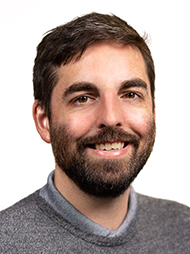
McNulty's official portrait, 2022–2025 term

During the 2022–2025 term, McNulty served as deputy chair of the regulatory processes committee, an external board appointee to Experience Wellington, and the Tawa Community Board.

McNulty withdrew his unconditional support of mayor Tory Whanau alongside three other left-wing councillors during the disagreements brought about by the proposed sale of the council's shares in Wellington Airport.

Talking to Heather du Plessis-Allan on Newstalk ZB in April 2025, he said that he supported giving 16 year olds the vote in local council elections and that he voted in favour of a council motion reaffirming the council's support of the issue.

In July 2025, McNulty put forward a motion for the council to change protections around heritage listings in the city's district plan. He said that residents of Wellington were "sick" of the urban decay caused by "dysfunctional" rules regarding the listing of "nightmare" properties as heritage. He had written a letter to Minister Responsible for RMA Reform Chris Bishop alongside mayor Whanau, urging a law change that would allow them to de-list such properties, pointing to concerns over "overly expensive upgrades". Noted properties contributing to urban decay included the Dixon St Flats, the Adelaide Road Hotel, and the Army Headquarters.

=== 2025 election ===
McNulty ran successfully for re-election in 2025, securing more votes than any councillor had ever received since the introduction of the single transferable vote method. McNulty told The Post that he "couldn't believe the numbers" as they came in on election day. He took the record from previous holder Tamatha Paul who was elected to the Pukehīnau/Lambton ward in 2022.

McNulty credited his use of social media and door-to-door communication with potential voters as a reason for his electoral success. Previous record holder Paul also pointed to his use of social media platforms like Reddit and TikTok as reasons for his "well-deserved" win.

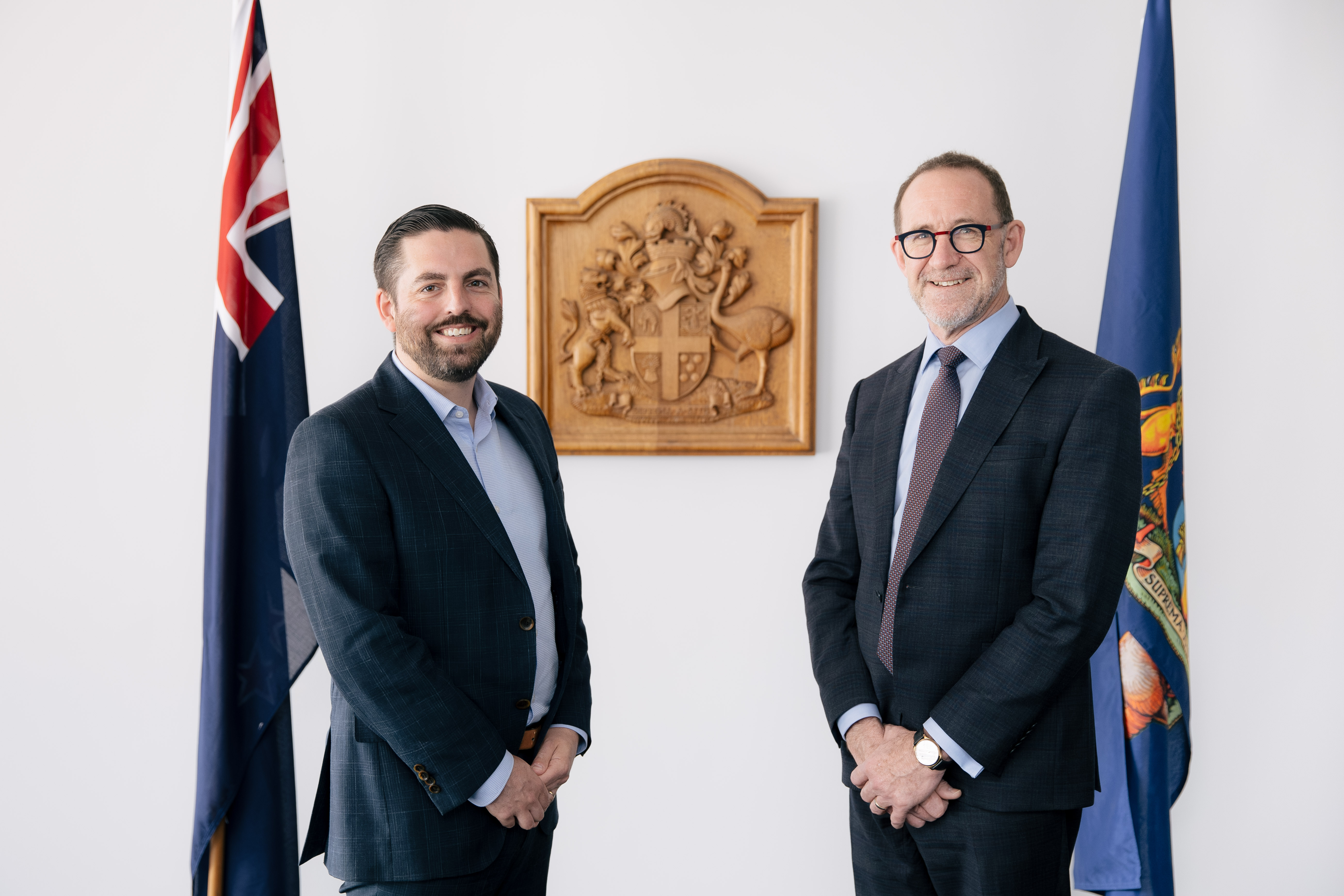
McNulty with Mayor Little in October 2025

=== 2025–2028 term ===
==== Wellington deputy mayoralty ====
Newly-elected mayor Andrew Little appointed McNulty to the position of deputy mayor for 18 months at the start of the 2025–2028 term. Little told the New Zealand Herald that McNulty indicated he did not want more than 18 months". McNulty told reporters that he was "grateful' for Little's trust in him, and that he thought "public trust must be restored, rates need to be bought under control, and [that] Wellington needs to grow out of its current malaise".

McNulty and Little will receive their respective chains of office at the official inauguration ceremony on 30 October. The ceremony and inaugural council meeting will be held at Pipitea Marae.

On 5 February 2026, McNulty was censured and forced to apologise after calling a member of the public a 'nonce'. The exchange, which took place on X, led to a code of conduct complaint that was later upheld. Mayor Little said of McNulty's behaviour that it was a "failure to remember the respect and dignity of the elected member’s office when dealing with the public". McNulty claimed to not know the exact connotations of the term, saying he took the phrase to be similar in meaning to calling someone a 'dick'.

== Electoral history ==
=== Wellington City Council ===
==== 2022 Takapū/Northern general ward election ====
Takapū/Northern general ward
Affiliation	Candidate	Primary vote	%	Final vote (Note: Rounded to nearest whole number)	%
Labour	Ben McNulty	2,390	16.92	3,093	21.90
Independent	Tony Randle	2,262	16.01	3,093	21.86
Independent	John Apanowicz	2,006	14.20	3,088	21.86
Independent	Jenny Condie^{†}	1,935	13.70	2,984	21.13
Independent	Rachel Qi	1,586	11.23		
Green	Robyn Parkinson	1,366	9.67		
Independent	John Peters	1,043	7.38		
Independent	Raveen Annamalai	652			
Independent	James Sullivan	188	4.62		
Independent	James Sales	150	1.06		
Informal		38	0.27		
Blank		509	3.60		
Turnout		14,125	40.82		
Registered		34,605			
Labour hold on 7th iteration					
Independent gain from Independent on 7th iteration					
Independent gain from Independent on 9th iteration					
^{†} incumbent

==== 2025 Takapū/Northern general ward election ====
2025 Takapū/Northern general ward election
Party	Candidate	Primary votes	%	±%	Iteration	
Party	Candidate	Primary votes	%	±%	#	Votes
Labour	Ben McNulty^{†}	8,601	52.25	+35.39	1st	8,601
Independent	Tony Randle^{†}	2,136	12.98	−2.98	6th	4,173
Independent	Andrew Compton	1,458	8.86	(new)	8th	3,313
Independent	John Apanowicz^{†}	1,143	6.94	−7.21	8th	3,176
ACT Local	Mark Flynn	1,698	10.32	(new)	5th	2,087
Independent	Michael Hill	561	3.41	(new)	4th	981
Independent	Joan Shi	480	2.92	(new)	3rd	794
Quota		4,019	24.42	+0.46		
Informal votes		61	0.37	+0.10		
Blank votes		322	1.96	−1.63		
Turnout		16,460	46.55	+5.60		
Registered electors		35,362				
Labour hold on 1st iteration						
Independent hold on 6th iteration						
Independent gain from Independent on 8th iteration						
^{†} incumbent

== Personal life ==
McNulty lives in Johnsonville with his wife; they have two children.
