= 2016 Wellington City Council election =

2016 New Zealand local election

- 8 October 2016
- Turnout: 45.57% ▲4.72 pp ( 64,659 out of 141,889 enrolled voters)
- Mayoral election
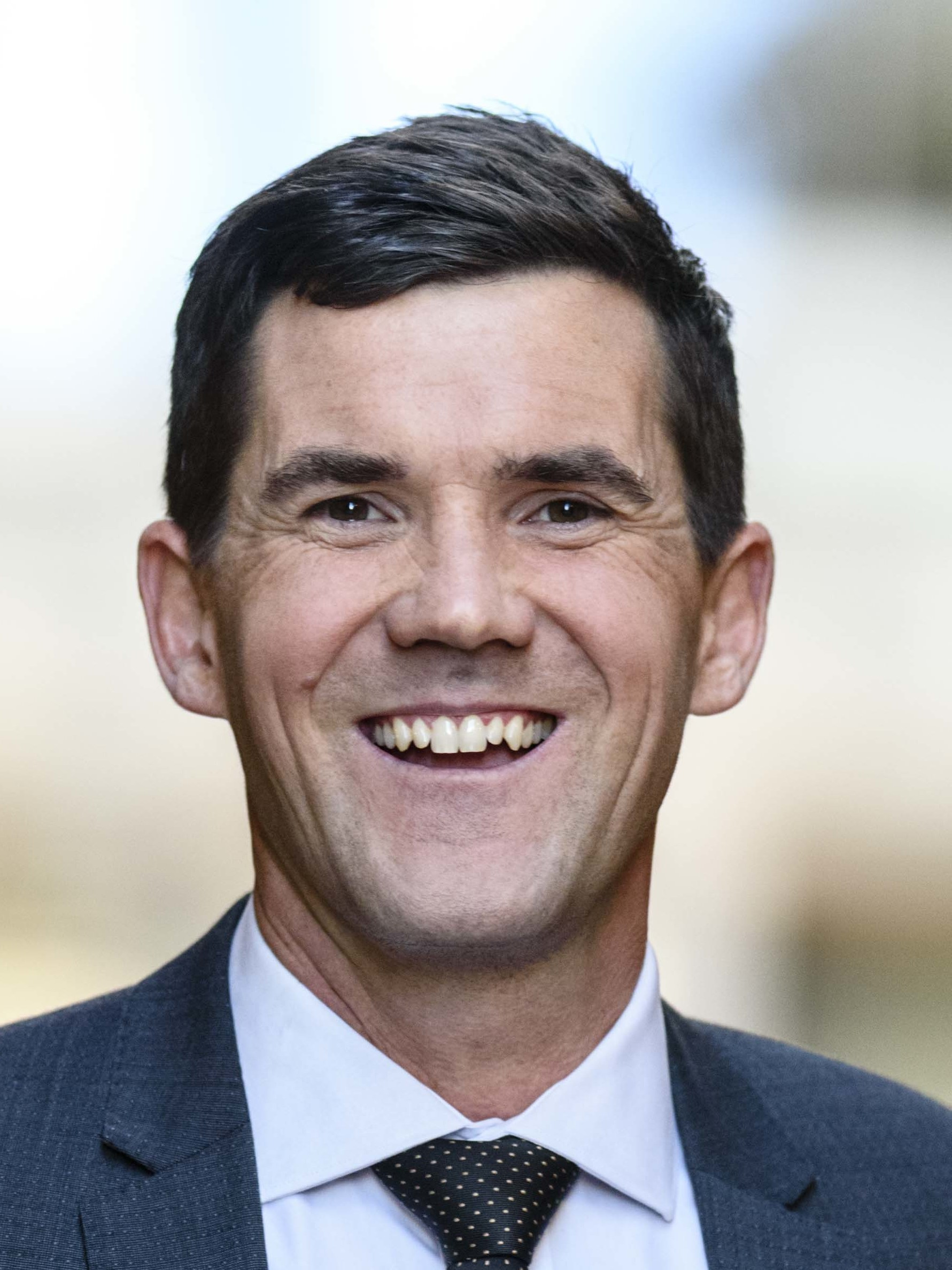

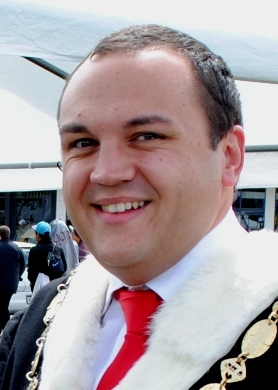
Candidate	Justin Lester	Nick Leggett
Party	Labour	Independent
Final round votes	31,921	24,697
Percentage	49.07%	37.97%
First choice votes	23,751	16,528
Percentage	36.51%	25.41%
Mayor before election
Celia Wade-Brown
Independent
Elected mayor
Justin Lester
Labour
- Council election
- All 14 seats available
Party	Leader	Vote %	Seats	+/–
Independents			8	−1
Labour			3	+1
Green			3	0
This lists parties that won seats. See the complete results below.

The 2016 Wellington City Council election took place on the 8th of October 2016, to elect the Mayor of Wellington, city councillors, and community board members for the 2016–2019 term, as part of nation-wide local elections.

== Electoral system ==
The fourteen councilors were elected across five wards whilst the Mayor was elected at large. All offices were elected through a single transferable vote (STV) system done via postal voting.

Candidates could not spend more than $60,000 on electoral expenses and had to disclose details of any donations larger than $1,500.

== Results ==
=== Mayor ===
==== Fundraising and endorsements ====
Justin Lester (Labour)

Endorsements

- Andrew Little, leader of the opposition
- Celia Wade-Brown, outgoing mayor

Donations

- $5,000 – E tū, trade union
- $2,000 – Ian Cassels, property developer
- $2,000 – "GJ Morrison"

Expenses

- $57,967.78
Nick Leggett

Endorsements

- Mark Blumsky, former mayor

Donations

- $40,000 – Chris Parkin, businessman/former councillor
- $40,000 – Ian Cassels, property developer
- $1,500 – Chris Kirk-Burnnand, property developer
- $10,000 – Mark Dunajtschik, property developer
- $4,497 – Joe Williams, judge
- $10,000 – Caniwi Capital Partners, private equity firm
- $5,000 Gil Consultants, property management company
- $5,000 Graeme Cromie, property developer
- $10,000 Cambridge Funds Management, holding company

Expenses

- $55,267.87
Jo Coughlan

Endorsements

- Kerry Prendergast, former mayor
- Fran Wilde, former mayor
- Jack Yan, former mayoral candidate

Donations

- $5,000 – "DHC Trust"
- $2,000 – "R Bridges"
- $2,000 – Ian Cassels, property developer
- $12,000 – "T Bowher"
- $26,000 – Julie Nevett

Expenses

- $55,013.76

==== Results ====
2016 Wellington City mayoral election
Party	Candidate	FPv%	Count						
Party	Candidate	FPv%	1	2	3	4	5	6	7
Labour	Justin Lester	36.51%	23,751	23,884	24,092	24,887	26,418	27,674	31,921
Independent	Nick Leggett	25.41%	16,528	16,584	16,709	17,011	17,598	18,667	24,697
Independent	Jo Coughlan	20.30%	13,203	13,233	13,347	13,602	14,190	15,844	
Freeze rates and cut waste	Nicola Young	6.61%	4,303	4,367	4,598	5,104	5,532		
Independent	Andy Foster	4.80%	3,125	3,168	3,304	3,718			
Independent	Helene Ritchie	3.75%	2,439	2,538	2,733				
Independent	Keith Johnson	1.67%	1,083	1,190					
The Localisation Party	Don McDonald	0.95%	620						
Valid: 65,052 Spoilt: 515 Quota: first iteration: 32,526, last iteration: 28,309

Sankey diagram of the mayoral election results.

=== Councillors ===
† indicates the incumbent candidate

==== Northern Ward ====
The Northern ward returned three councillors to the Wellington City Council.

2016 Wellington City Northern Ward Election
Party	Candidate	FPv%	Count				
Party	Candidate	FPv%	1	2	3	4	5
Independent	Malcolm Sparrow†	28.71%	3,730	3,248	3,404.08	3,555.83	3,096.96
Independent	Jill Day	16.91%	2,197	2,296.76	2,551.36	3,153.97	3,220.96
Labour	Peter Gilberd	19.95%	2,592	2,670.18	2,815.76	3,081.45	3,195.39
Local Champion for YOUR Northern Suburbs	Graeme Sawyer	14.17%	1,841	1,924.74	2,130.98	2,543.74	2,678.74
Independent	Judith Gray	11.38%	1,479	1,578.76	1,837.27		
Independent	John Apanowicz	8.87%	1,153	1,198.36			
Valid: 12,992 Spoilt: 947 Quota: first iteration: 3,248, last iteration: 3,048.02

==== Onslow-Western ward ====
The Onslow-Western ward returned three councillors to the Wellington City Council.

2016 Wellington City Wharangi/Onslow-Western Ward
Party	Candidate	FPv%	Count					
Party	Candidate	FPv%	1	2	3	4	5	6
Independent	Andy Foster†	32.69%	5,608	4,027.47	4,017.30	3,872.38	3,908.29	4,027.47
Independent	Simon Woolf†	24.52%	4,206	4,531.71	3,926.34	3,912.84	3,904.82	4,193.62
Independent	Diane Calvert	13.48%	2,313	2,708.21	2,914.09	3,011.70	3,157.63	3,677.75
Independent	Ray Chung	9.98%	1,713	1,950.27	2,072.39	2,133.56	2,252.56	2,736.87
A fresh voice for change and affordable rates	Matthew Plummer	9.04%	1,551	1,715.50	1,801.46	1,868.42	1,967.21	
Independent	Paul Douglas	2.10%	361	447.13	472.90	505.39		
Independent	Thomas Gregory Phipps Morgan	0/76%	130	160.14	171.38			
Valid: 17,156 Spoilt: 1,271 Quota: first iteration: 3,970.50, last iteration: 3,658.93

==== Lambton Ward ====
The Lambton ward returned three councillors to the Wellington City Council.

2016 Wellington City Lambton Ward Election
Party	Candidate	FPv%	Count								
Party	Candidate	FPv%	1	2	3	4	5	6	7	8	9
Green	Iona Pannett†	37.24%	4,387	2,944.75	2,894.94	2,940.05	2,883.00	2,907.65	2,862.43	2,935.09	2,903.97
Freeze rates and cut waste	Nicola Young†	22.51%	2,652	2,864.70	2,872.05	2,934.60	2,886.76	2,974.64	2,858.23	2,945.76	2,977.18
Labour	Brian Dawson	14.86%	1,750	2,328.94	2,348.93	2,416.33	2,448.11	2,512.70	2,550.55	2,714.22	2,913.97
Independent	Mazz Scannell	11.24%	1,324	1,447.61	1,451.88	1,520.10	1,541.48	1,622.77	1,664.67	1,770.78	2,153.97
Independent	Tony Jansen	4.21%	496	582.13	585.11	628.75	639.78	731.83	754.37	883.47	
A more responsive Council	Milton Hollard	3.74%	440	557.04	561.08	589.20	599.09	648.80	664.97		
Independent	Dave Gee	3.39%	399	437.46	438.79	479.97	487.37				
The Independent Choice	Troy Mihaka	2.81%	331	417.14	420.11						
Valid: 11,779 Spoilt: 886 Quota: first iteration: 2944.75, last iteration: 2737.27

==== Eastern Ward ====
The Eastern ward returned three councillors to the Wellington City Council.

2016 Wellington City Eastern Ward Election
Party	Candidate	FPv%	Count				
Party	Candidate	FPv%	1	2	3	4	5
Green	Sarah Free†	30.72%	3,711	3,023.08	3,083.51	3,145.98	2,941.82
Independent	Simon Swampy Marsh†	25.20%	3,044	3,132.65	3,112.53	3,380.34	2,908.52
Connecting Communities	Chris Calvi-Freeman	17.64%	2,131	2,296.88	2,481.92	2,833.23	3,073.42
Labour	Lynda McGregor	12.96%	1,565	1,786.93	1,874.32	2,110.85	2,295.93
Independent	Rob Goulden	8.88%	1,073	1,126.74	1,269.14		
Independent	Robert Murray	4.59%	555	594.62			
Valid: 12,079 Spoilt: 778 Quota: first iteration: 3019.75, last iteration: 3073.42

==== Southern Ward ====
The Southern ward returns two councillors to the Wellington City Council.

2016 Wellington City Council Southern Ward Election
Party	Candidate	FPv%	Count	
Party	Candidate	FPv%	1	2
Labour	Paul Eagle†	55.59%	4,785	2,869.00
Green	David Lee†	28.76%	2,475	3,229.79
Red/Green Independent	Brendon Bonner	9.29%	800	1,269.69
Independent	Brent Pierson	5.03%	433	619.59
Hold us to Account	Don Newt McDonald	1.32%	114	167.66
Valid: 8,607 Spoilt: 346 Quota: first iteration: 2,869, last iteration: 2,718.58

== Other local elections ==
=== Tawa Community Board ===
The Tawa Community Board is made up of 2 councilors along with 6 representatives who are voted in by residents of Tawa, Grenada North and Takapu Valley.

Only six candidates ran so all won automatically. However Jill Day's seat was superseded by winning a seat on the council and a by-election was called for 2017 to fill the remaining seat. Jill Day held the seat until then.

2016 Tawa Community Board Election
Party	Candidate	FPv%	Count
Party	Candidate	FPv%	1
Independent	Graeme Hansen		N/A
Independent	Robyn Parkinson		N/A
Independent	Margaret Lucas		N/A
Independent	Richard Herbert		N/A
Independent	Jack Marshall		N/A
Independent	~~Jill Day~~		N/A
Quota: N/A

2017 Tawa Community Board By-election
Party	Candidate	FPv%	Count		
Party	Candidate	FPv%	1	2	3
Independent	Liz Langham		–	–	1,403
Independent	Damian Hewett		–	–	637
Independent	Anna Scott		–	–	512
Independent	Stacey Richardson		–	398	
Independent	Craig Robertson		268		
Quota: N/A

=== Mākara / Ōhāriu Community Board ===
The Mākara / Ōhāriu Community Board is made up of 6 representatives voted in by residents of Mākara, Mākara Beach and Ōhāriu.

2016 Mākara / Ōhāriu Community Board Election
Party	Candidate	FPv%	Count				
Party	Candidate	FPv%	1	2	3	4	5
Independent	Christine Grace	42.66%	141	53.28	52.83	47.73	46.75
Independent	Hamish Todd	22.32%	79	58.78	50.62	47.95	47.05
Independent	Chris Renner	11.58%	41	80.97	50.08	48.97	47.47
Independent	John Apanowicz	11.58%	41	48.75	52.12	48.05	47.16
Independent	Wayne Rudd	2.82%	10	32.78	48.60	50.87	47.96
Independent	Judy Liddell	7.34%	26	36.68	42.45	45.29	47.29
Independent	Kath May	2.54%	9	15.39	18.60	20.76	22.01
Independent	Ray Chung	1.98%	7	10.28	12.22	13.29	13.90
Valid: 354 Spoilt: 14 Quota: first iteration: 50.57, last iteration: 45.66

== See also ==
- 2016 Greater Wellington Regional Council election
- 2016 Porirua City Council election
- 2016 Hutt City Council election
- 2016 Upper Hutt City Council election
- 2016 Kāpiti Coast District Council election
- 2016 New Zealand local elections
