= Nicola Young =

New Zealand local politician

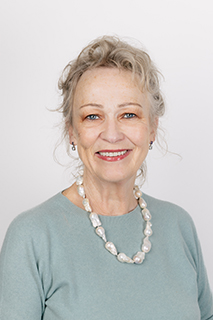
- Official portrait, 2025

Wellington city councillor for the Pukehīnau/Lambton general ward
- Incumbent
- Assumed office 13 October 2013

Personal details
- Born: Nicola Mary Jacobina Young; 1954 or 1955 (age 71–72) Wellington, New Zealand
- Party: Independent
- Children: 2
- Parents: Bill Young (father); Joan Young (mother)
- Relatives: Annabel Young (sister)
- Education: Massey University

Nicola Young (born 1954 or 1955) is a New Zealand politician who has since 2013 been a Wellington city councillor, representing the Pukehīnau/Lambton ward.

== Early life ==
Young was born in 1954 or 1955 in Wellington, New Zealand. Her parents, Joan and Bill Young, had four other children. Her father Bill was a National Party MP from 1966 until 1981. Young grew up in Mount Victoria and Kelburn.

She attended St Mary's Primary School in Thorndon and for secondary school she went to Erskine College where she was head girl. Young studied news journalism at Massey University.

== Career ==
Young started working as a civic reporter for The Evening Post for two years before moving to London.

In the 2005 New Zealand general election, Young was the National Party candidate for Rongotai. She lost to Annette King of the Labour Party by over 12,000 votes.

=== Councillor ===
Young is an independent Wellington City councillor. She has served five terms representing the Pukehīnau Lambton Ward since 2013. Young is the chairperson of Grants Subcommittee.

She was first elected in the 2013 Wellington City Council election, receiving the second-most votes in Lambton Ward, for which there were three vacancies. She was reelected in 2016, once again receiving the second-most votes. In the 2019 election, she was reelected in the newly renamed Pukehīnau Lambton Ward with the second-most votes — with Iona Pannett placing first. In the 2022 election, Young was reelected, this time placing second with Tamatha Paul receiving the most votes in the ward. In the 2025 election, she was reelected with the third-most votes in the ward.

Young has unsuccessfully run for the Wellington mayoralty twice. In 2013, she received the fourth most votes, losing to Celia Wade-Brown. In 2015 she announced she would run a campaign alongside Paul Eagle for the mayoralty. In the 2016 election she again received the fourth most votes, with Justin Lester being elected.

==== Airport shares ====
In 2023, the WCC proposed selling its 34% stake in Wellington Airport to create a disaster investment fund. On 30 May 2024, with Young's vote in favour, the sale narrowly passed 8–8 with Mayor Tory Whanau's tie-breaking vote, despite strong opposition from Labour, some Green councillors, unions, and the public. The decision caused a rift within the Greens and drew criticism from Green MPs, with polling showing 74% public opposition. In August 2024, a majority of councillors attempted to revoke the decision, but the notice was ruled invalid, prompting a fresh vote. On 9 October 2024, the council reversed course, voting 9–7 to retain the airport shares, with several councillors including Young changing their positions. Following the failed sale and other funding decisions, the Minister of Local Government Simeon Brown appointed a Crown observer to the council. Young agreed the government should intervene and that a Crown observer should be appointed.

==== Call for mayor's resignation ====
In 2023, Wellington mayor Tory Whanau was allegedly drunk in public. Whanau had acknowledged her struggles with alcohol and admitted to being intoxicated at a bar. There was no evidence to support claims of any additional misconduct. Broadcaster Sean Plunket interviewed Young, who called for the mayor's resignation in light of this scandal.

== Personal life ==
Young lives in Mount Victoria, Wellington, and has two children and a grandson. Young's sister Annabel Young was a National Party MP, like her father, from 1997 to 2002. She has three other siblings.

Young's great-grandfather was Sir John Luke, Mayor of Wellington from 1913 to 1921 and Member of Parliament for Wellington Suburbs from 1908 to 1911 and Wellington North from 1918 to 1928.

== Electoral history ==
=== 2025 Pukehīnau/Lambton general ward election ===
2025 Pukehīnau/Lambton general ward election
Party	Candidate	Primary votes	%	±%	Iteration	
Party	Candidate	Primary votes	%	±%	#	Votes
Green	Geordie Rogers^{†}	4,445	31.45	(new)	1st	4,445
Labour	Afnan Al-Rubayee	2,701	19.11	+11.69	4th	3,423
Independent	Nicola Young^{†}	2,496	17.66	+1.66	9th	3,711
Independent	Tim Ward	1,247	8.82	(new)	9th	2,215
Independent	Dan Milward	970	6.86	(new)	8th	1,472
Independent	David Lee	588	4.16	(new)	7th	874
Independent	Rodney Barber	490	3.47	(new)	6th	576
Independent Together	Stuart Wong	363	2.57	(new)	5th	387
Independent	Teal Mau	263	1.86	(new)	4th	291
Independent	Tony De Lorenzo	167	1.18	(new)	3rd	178
Independent	Zan Rai Gyaw	39	0.28	−0.27	2nd	39
Quota		3,442	24.35	+0.28		
Informal votes		67	0.47	+0.16		
Blank votes		298	2.11	+0.09		
Turnout		14,134	44.66	+4.29		
Registered electors		31,650				
Green hold on 1st iteration						
Labour gain from Independent on 4th iteration						
Independent hold on 9th iteration						
^{†} incumbent
