= 2007 Wellington City Council election =

Local election in New Zealand

- 13 October 2007
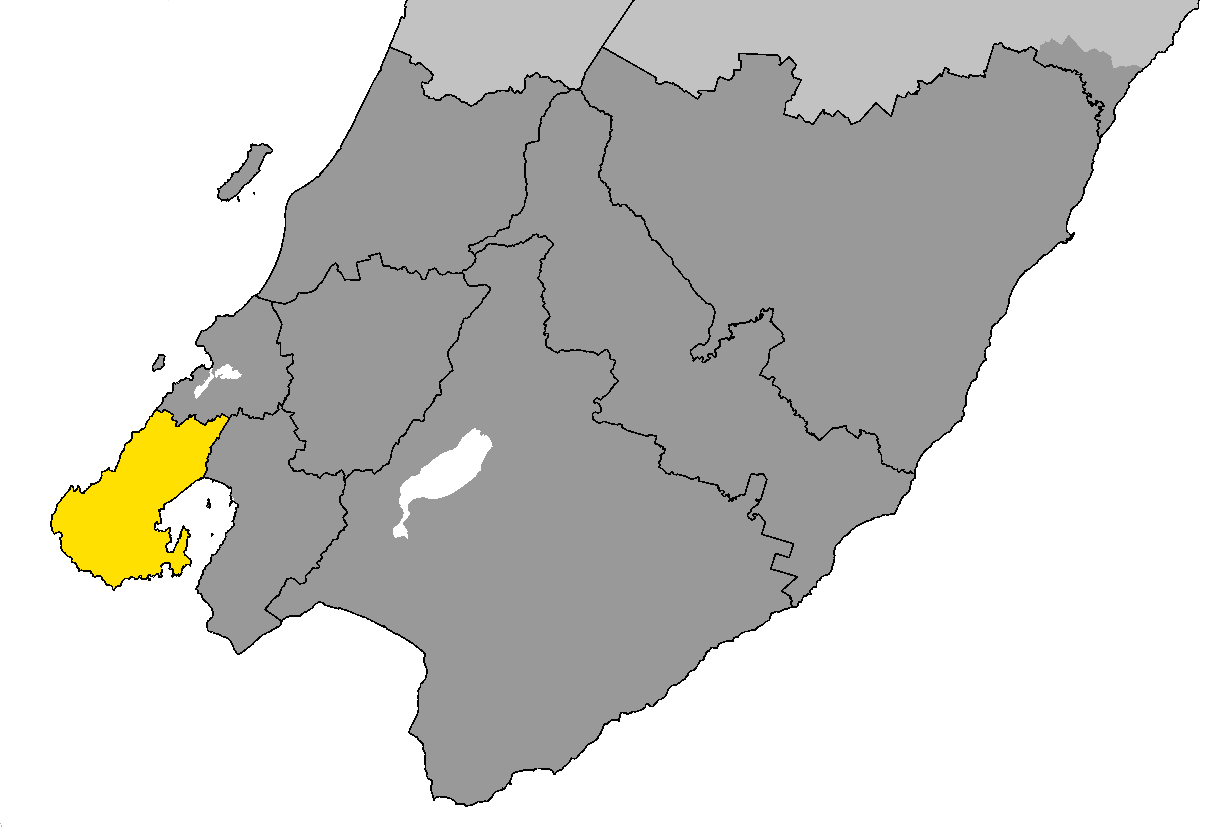
- Position of Wellington City within Wellington Region

The 2007 Wellington City Council election was part of the 2007 New Zealand local elections, to elect members to sub-national councils and boards.

== Council ==
The Wellington City Council consists of a mayor and fourteen councillors elected from five wards (Northern, Onslow-Western, Lambton, Eastern, Southern) using the Single Transferable Vote system.

=== Mayor ===
2007 Wellington City mayoral election
Party	Candidate	FPv%	Count								
Party	Candidate	FPv%	1	2	3	4	5	6	7	8	9
Independent	Kerry Prendergast	34.89	17,910	18,008	18,110	18,327	18,521	19,274	19,925	20,516	21,868
Independent	Ray Ahipene-Mercer	13.55	6,954	7,065	7,168	7,360	7,642	8,003	8,632	9,389	10,899
Independent	Bryan Pepperell	11.07	5,680	5,752	5,861	5,966	6,187	6,458	7,070	8,335	10,125
Independent	Helene Ritchie	10.83	5,559	5,633	5,755	5,865	6,050	6,346	6,754	7,643	
Independent	Jack Ruben	7.66	3,930	3,996	4,076	4,228	4,424	4,723	5,348		
Independent	Rob Goulden	6.21	3,187	3,241	3,299	3,515	3,708	4,213			
Independent	John McGrath	6.05	3,106	3,155	3,188	3,344	3,473				
Independent	Carl Gifford	3.37	1,730	1,779	1,901	2,015					
Independent	Paul Bailey	2.95	1,512	1,546	1,584						
Workers Party	Nick Kelly	1.82	932	988							
Independent	Nick Wang	1.63	838								
Electorate: 132,051 Valid: 51,328 Spoilt: 218 Quota: 21446 Turnout: 39.76

=== Eastern ward ===
The Eastern ward returns three councillors to the Wellington City Council. The final iteration of results for the ward were:

Eastern Ward (3 vacancies)
Party	Candidate	Votes	%	±%
Independent	Ray Ahipene-Mercer	3,190		
Labour	Leonie Gill	2,698		
Independent	Rob Goulden	2.375		
Independent	Ruth Gotlieb	1,949		
Independent	Paul Bailey	1,058		
Independent	Josie Bullock	546		
Independent	Ian Macfarlane	411		
Informal votes				
Turnout		12,227		

=== Lambton ward ===
The Lambton ward returns three councillors to the Wellington City Council. The final iteration of results for the ward were:

Lambton Ward (3 vacancies)
Party	Candidate	Votes	%	±%
Independent	Ian McKinnon	2,649		
Green	Iona Pannett	2,401		
Independent	Stephanie Cook	2,460		
Labour	Alick Shaw	1,673		
Independent	Callum Strong	720		
Independent	Ed van Son	424		
Independent	Frank Lawton	306		
Independent	Micheal Durrant	230		
Informal votes				
Turnout		10,863		

=== Northern ward ===
The Northern ward returns three councillors to the Wellington City Council. The final iteration of results for the ward were:

Northern Ward (3 vacancies)
Party	Candidate	Votes	%	±%
Independent	Hayley Wain	2,968		
Independent	Helene Ritchie	2,446		
Independent	Ngaire Best	2,412		
Independent	Robert Armstrong	2,280		
Independent	Roger Ellis	1,569		
Independent	James Candiliotis	1,352		
Independent	Ian Hutchings	1,175		
Green	Tane Woodley	699		
Independent	Mike Collett	392		
Independent	Jonathan Fletcher	322		
Informal votes				
Turnout		15,613		

=== Onslow-Western ward ===
The Onslow-Western ward returns three councillors to the Wellington City Council. The final iteration of results for the ward were:

Onslow-Western Ward (3 vacancies)
Party	Candidate	Votes	%	±%
Independent	Andy Foster	4,246		
Independent	John Morrison	3,296		
Independent	Jo Coughlan	3,176		
Independent	Jack Ruben	3,141		
Labour	Pauline Scott	1,103		
Informal votes				
Turnout		14,692		

=== Southern ward ===
The Southern ward returns two councillors to the Wellington City Council. The final iteration of results for the ward were:

Southern Ward (2 vacancies)
Party	Candidate	Votes	%	±%
Green	Celia Wade-Brown	2,286		
Independent	Bryan Pepperell	2,134		
Independent	Lorraine Edwards	910		
Labour	Ida Faiumu-Isa'ako	907		
Independent	Rex Nairn	676		
Independent	Shelagh Noble	501		
Independent	John Robinson	388		
Independent	Bernie Harris	302		
Informal votes				
Turnout		8,104		
