= 2013 Wellington City Council election =

Elections in New Zealand

- 12 October 2013
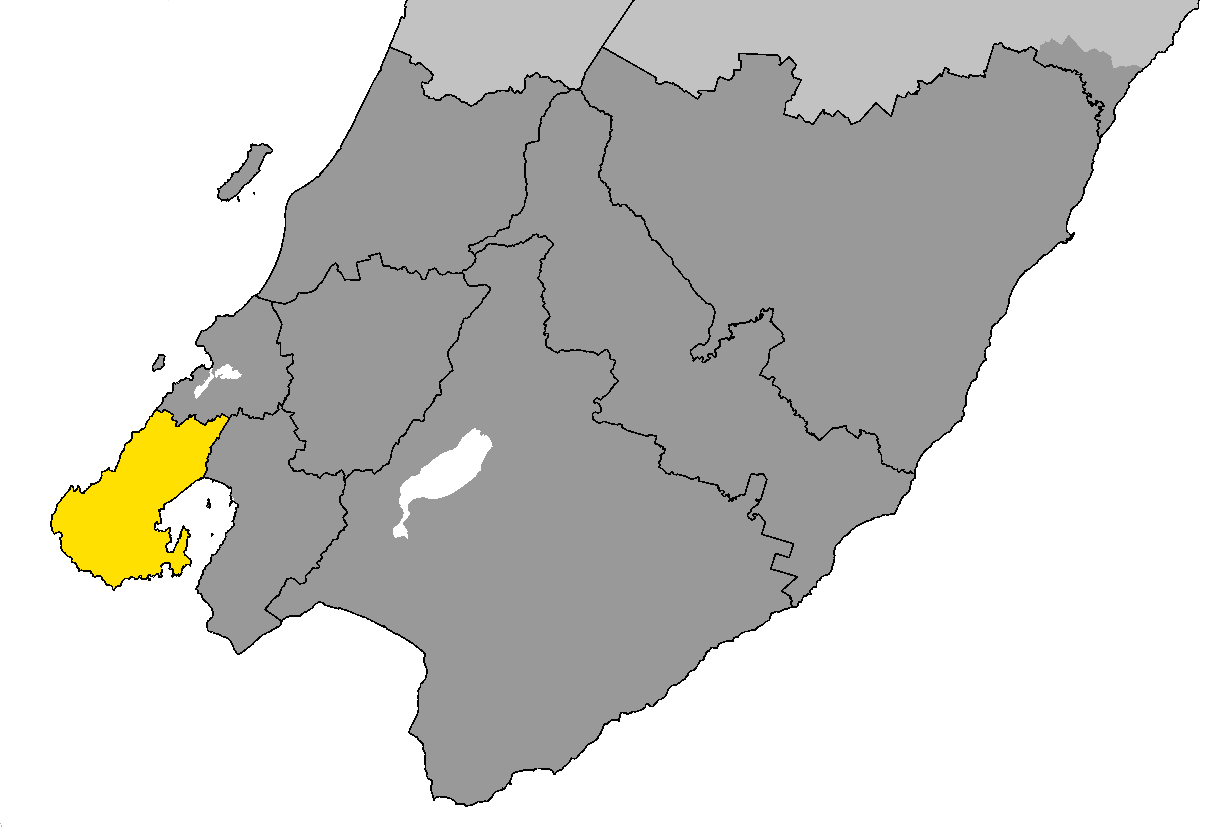
- Position of Wellington within the Greater Wellington region
- Mayoral election
Mayor before election
Celia Wade-Brown
Independent
Elected mayor
Celia Wade-Brown
Independent

The 2013 Wellington City Council election was part of the 2013 New Zealand local elections, to elect members to sub-national councils and boards.

== Results ==
The Wellington City Council consists of a mayor and fourteen councillors elected from five wards (Northern, Onslow-Western, Lambton, Eastern, Southern) using the Single Transferable Vote system.

=== Mayor ===
2013 Wellington City mayoral election
Party	Candidate	FPv%	Count				
Party	Candidate	FPv%	1	2	3	4	5
Independent	Celia Wade-Brown	37.61	21,259	21,449	22,021	23,228	27,171
Independent	John Morrison	33.44	18,904	19,064	19,769	21,433	24,691
Independent	Jack Yan	14.33	8,105	8,346	8,782	9,996	
Independent	Nicola Young	7.99	4,520	4,612	5,108		
Independent	Rob Goulden	4.47	2,531	2,607			
Independent	Karunanidhi Muthu	1.65	935				
Electorate: Valid: 56,524 Spoilt: 71 Quota: 25,931 Turnout: 40.85%

=== Councillors ===
==== Eastern ward ====
The Eastern ward returns three councillors to the Wellington City Council. The final iteration of results for the ward were:

Eastern Ward (3 vacancies)
Party	Candidate	Votes	%	±%
Independent	Simon (Swampy) Marsh	2,752		
Independent	Ray Ahipene-Mercer	2,705		
Green	Sarah Free	2,659		
Labour	Leonie Gill	2,322		
Independent	Rob Goulden	1,202		
Independent	John Coleman	849		
Independent	Jennifer Stephen	601		
Independent	Karunanidhi Muthu	637		
Independent	Va'ai Va'a Potoi	359		
Independent	Graham McCready	239		
Independent	Peter Kennedy	161		
Majority		2,572		
Turnout				

==== Lambton ward ====
The Lambton ward returns three councillors to the Wellington City Council. The final iteration of results for the ward were:

Lambton Ward (3 vacancies)
Party	Candidate	Votes	%	±%
Green	Iona Pannett	3,430		
Independent	Nicola Young	2,518		
Labour	Mark Peck	2,388		
Independent	Rex Nicholls	1,949		
Independent	John Dow	1,044		
Independent	John Woolf	789		
Independent	Jennifer Stephen	601		
Independent	Mark Wilson	442		
Legalise Cannabis	Michael Appleby	390		
Independent	Stephen Preston	313		
Independent	Milton Hollard	139		
Majority		2,253		
Turnout				

==== Northern ward ====
The Northern ward returns three councillors to the Wellington City Council. The final iteration of results for the ward were:

Northern Ward (3 vacancies)
Party	Candidate	Votes	%	±%
Independent	Justin Lester	3,841		
Independent	Malcolm Sparrow	3,039		
Independent	Helene Ritchie	2,759		
Labour	Peter Gilberd	2,732		
Independent	Regan Cutting	906		
Independent	Jacob Toner	378		
Majority		2,754		
Turnout				

==== Onslow-Western ward ====
The Onslow-Western ward returns three councillors to the Wellington City Council. The final iteration of results for the ward were:

Onslow-Western Ward (3 vacancies)
Party	Candidate	Votes	%	±%
Independent	Andy Foster	4,381		
Independent	Jo Coughlan	3,495		
Independent	Simon Woolf	3,579		
Labour	Malcolm Aitken	1,982		
Independent	Hayley Robinson	970		
Independent	Phil Howison	707		
Independent	Martin Wilson	607		
Independent	Dan Coffey	502		
Independent	Sridhar Ekambaram	342		
Independent	Arie Ketel	224		
Independent	Emma MacRae	202		
Independent	Gill Holmes	80		
Majority		3,419		
Turnout				

==== Southern ward ====
The Southern ward returns two councillors to the Wellington City Council. The final iteration of results for the ward were:

Southern Ward (2 vacancies)
Party	Candidate	Votes	%	±%
Labour	Paul Eagle	3,626		
Green	David Lee	2,336		
Independent	Ginette McDonald	2,235		
Independent	Bryan Pepperell	961		
Independent	Will Moore	618		
Independent	Brent Pierson	409		
Independent	Don McDonald	137		
Majority		2,295		
Turnout				
