= 2022 Wellington City Council election =

Elections in New Zealand

- 8 October 2022
- Turnout: 73,067 (45.54% ▲4.34 pp)
- Mayoral election
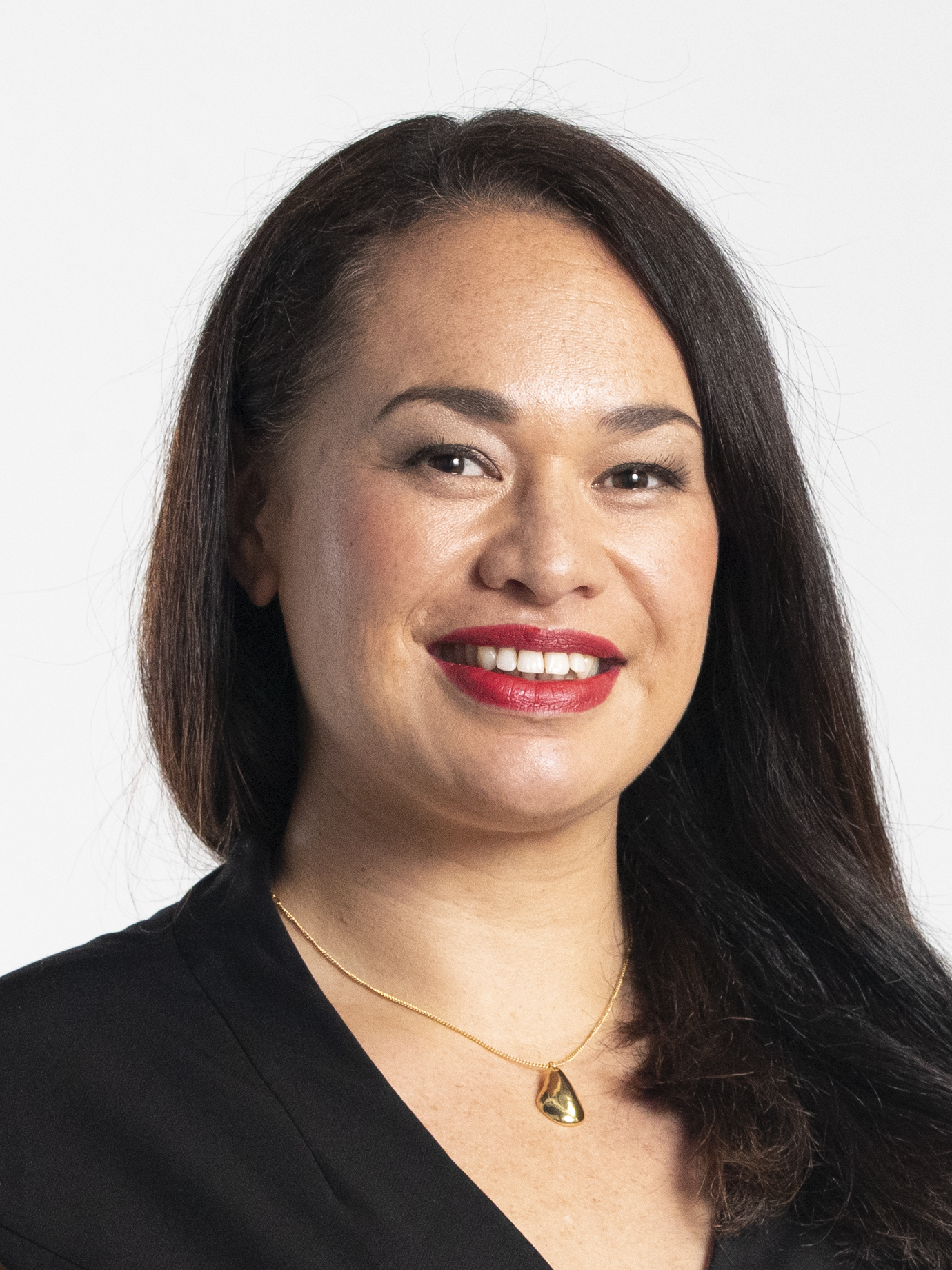

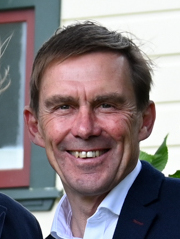

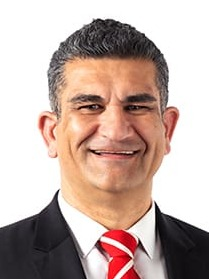
Candidate	Tory Whanau	Andy Foster	Paul Eagle
Affiliation	Independent Green	Independent	Independent
Primary vote	30,656	11,835	11,935
Percentage	42.56%	16.43%	16.57%
Final vote	34,462	16,711	14,589
Percentage	52.40%	25.41%	22.18%
Mayor before election
Andy Foster
Independent
Elected mayor
Tory Whanau
Independent Green
- Council election
- 15 seats on the Wellington City Council; 8 seats needed for a majority
Party	Seats	+/–
Independents	8	+2
Labour	4	0
Green	3	0
This lists parties that won seats. See the complete results below.

First preference vote share of elected councillors by ward

The 2022 Wellington City Council election was a local election held from 16 September to 11 October in Wellington, New Zealand, as part of that year's nation-wide local elections. Voters elected the mayor of Wellington, 15 city councillors, and other local representatives for the 2022–2025 term of the Wellington City Council. Postal voting and the single transferable vote voting system were used.

== Key dates ==
15 July	Candidate nominations opened
12 August	Last day to enrol to receive voting papers
12 August	Candidate nominations closed at midday
16 September	Voting period starts, voting document sent out
7 October	Last day to enrol to be able to vote
8 October	Election day - voting closed at midday
8 October	Preliminary results released
13–19 October	Final results released in this period
26 October	New council and mayor sworn in

== Background ==
=== Electoral system ===
The election was held using the single transferable vote system. The mayor and 15 councillors were elected across six wards (five general and one māori ward). This was the first election to feature a Māori ward in Wellington.

=== Representation ===
The council held a meeting in 2020 to decide on representation considerations such as the voting system and whether a Māori ward should be introduced. Councillor Jill Day introduced an amendment to develop a report on giving mana whenua representatives voting rights and remuneration on council committees. Following the motion several councillors sung a waiata; councillor Sean Rush turned his back on the others for the duration of the waiata. Rush called for a point of order afterwards and said the amendment was out of scope; Foster ruled in Rush's favour. Rush would later apologize to Day.

The council voted in 2021 11-to-3 for the greater co-governance measures. Taranaki Whānui ki te Upoko o te Ika and Ngāti Toa could appoint a voting representative to most council committees and sub-committees and the iwi would each be paid an amount equal to a councillors salary. It was opposed by councillors Calvert, Sparrow and Young whilst Woolf was absent. The council later that year voted 13-to-2 to establish a Māori ward, which was opposed by councillors Young and Sparrow.

=== Incumbent mayor ===
Andy Foster was elected mayor of Wellington. Despite Foster's right wing position, a majority centre-left council was elected in the 2019 election.

=== Library ===
The Wellington Central Library was closed in 2019 after a report found that the building was earthquake prone and would collapse in conditions similar to the 2016 Kaikōura earthquake. The New Zealand Institute of Architects mounted a campaign to save the library in response to then mayor, Justin Lester's, statement that the building would be demolished.

The council voted in June 2019 to strengthen the library 14-to-1. This was despite reports that found that upgrading the library would be the more expensive option. Out of fear that the building may be demolished, Heritage New Zealand proposed heritage status for the library in 2020. Public consultations ran from September to October and although the consensus from the public was to demolish, the council didn't change their decision. The library was eventually designated a category 1 historic building by Heritage New Zealand, the first building constructed in the 1990s to receive the status.

Foster proposed selling off the building's office space to offload the earthquake strengthening costs. The proposal was successful with a 9–6 vote. The privatization faced opposition from all of the Labour councillors, and two of the Green councillors, Iona Pannett and Tamatha Paul. The other two Green councillors, Sarah Free and Laurie Foon, voted in favour of the proposal.

After the decision Labour councillor Fleur Fitzsimons, who held the libraries portfolio, reported Foster to the Auditor-General for an investigation. The Green party issued a "please explain" notice to Foon and Free over their votes in favour of privatization and for Foon's vote against increasing the cycling infrastructure budget. Foster soon after announced an independent review of the council's governance. The review found that the council had an unfit governance structure, a lack of direction and oversight, and some council staff feeling unsafe in giving free and frank advice.

Foon and fellow councillor Nicola Young then announced they no longer supported the privatization. Councillor Fitzsimons motioned for a second vote on the issue, seconded by Young. Foon, Young and Free changed their vote and the library remained in public ownership.

=== Councillor resignation ===
Councillor Malcom Sparrow resigned from the council in 2021 due to a health scare. Because there was less than a year until the next election, no by-election was held.

== Campaign ==
=== Water management ===
Water infrastructure in Wellington was managed by the regional body Wellington Water and was widely seen as inadequate; 40% of the city's water supply was lost in leaks. 57% of respondents to a Kantar poll cited water infrastructure as their top issue for this election.

The Sixth Labour Government announced its plans for water reform in October 2021, but the implementation was delayed until February 2022. They finalised the plan in April 2022 and then began implementation. Water management in New Zealand was to be transferred to four larger entities. These entities would be run by a board of councils where they get one vote per 50,000 citizens along with voting members representing iwi.

When asked about three waters both Whanau and Eagle supported it whereas Foster opposed the reform.

== Results ==
=== Mayor ===
Incumbent mayor Andy Foster announced his intention to seek re-election on 7 July 2022 on Newstalk ZB. Former Green Party parliamentary chief of staff Tory Whanau announced her campaign on 18 November 2021. She was endorsed by the party, but ran as an independent. Paul Eagle, a sitting MP for Rongotai, was endorsed by Labour and ran as an independent. Other candidates included Chris Dudfield, Kevin Hastie, Barbara McKenzie, and Ellen Blake. Foster said he saw the election as a two horse race between him and Paul Eagle.

Green-endorsed independent Tory Whanau defeated incumbent centre-right independent Andy Foster and Labour-endorsed independent Paul Eagle MP.

2022 Wellington City mayoral election
Party	Candidate	FPv%	Count						
Party	Candidate	FPv%	1	2	3	4	5	6	7
Independent	Tory Whanau	42.56%	30,656	30,762	31,176	31,330	32,027	32,317	34,462
Together for Wellington	Andy Foster †	16.43%	11,835	11,878	11,987	12,105	12,476	12,916	16,711
Independent	Paul Eagle	16.57%	11,935	11,974	12,097	12,213	12,519	12,783	14,589
Independent	Ray Chung	14.41%	10,383	10,436	10,524	10,979	11,285	12,670	
Independent – Vision/Skill/Results	Chris Dudfield	3.51%	2,535	2,553	2,585	2,754	2,960		
Future Wellington	Kelvin Hastie	2.73%	1,971	2,001	2,135	2,208			
Independent	Barbara McKenzie	1.69%	1,224	1,253	1,341				
Independent	Ellen Blake	1.52%	1,101	1,116					
Our truth all but whole truth	Don McDonald	0.53%	385						
Valid: 72,025 Spoilt: 1,042 Turnout: 45.54% (73,067 / 160,449)

=== Council ===
==== Summary ====
First preference vote share of Labour candidates

First preference vote share of Green candidates

Ward	Incumbent	Elected
Takapū/Northern general	Jill Day	Ben McNulty
Takapū/Northern general	Jenny Condie	Tony Randle
Takapū/Northern general	vacant	John Apanowicz
Wharangi/Onslow-Western general	Diane Calvert	Diane Calvert
Wharangi/Onslow-Western general	Simon Woolf	Ray Chung
Wharangi/Onslow-Western general	Rebecca Matthews	Rebecca Matthews
Pukehīnau/Lambton general	Tamatha Paul	Tamatha Paul
Pukehīnau/Lambton general	Nicola Young	Nicola Young
Pukehīnau/Lambton general	Iona Pannett	Iona Pannett
Motukairangi/Eastern general	Teri O'Neill	Teri O'Neill
Motukairangi/Eastern general	Sean Rush	Tim Brown
Motukairangi/Eastern general	Sarah Free	Sarah Free
Paekawakawa/Southern general	Laurie Foon	Laurie Foon
Paekawakawa/Southern general	Fleur Fitzsimons	Nureddin Abdurahman
Te Whanganui-a-Tara Māori	new	Nīkau Wi Neera

==== Takapū/Northern general ward ====
The Takapū/Northern general ward returned three councillors to the city council.

Incumbent councillor Jill Day announced she would not run for council again and instead run for a seat on the Tawa Community Board. Later in that year Day would be elected president of the Labour Party.

2022 Wellington City Council – Takapū/Northern General ward
Party	Candidate	FPv%	Count								
Party	Candidate	FPv%	1	2	3	4	5	6	7	8	9
Labour	Ben McNulty	17.60%	2,390	2,401	2,443	2,516	2,611	3,099	3,421	3,161.79	3,092.97
Independent	Tony Randle	16.66%	2,262	2,277	2,295	2,371	2,691	2,846	3,381	3,175.90	3,093.07
A Voice for Wellington	John Apanowicz	14.77%	2,006	2,027	2,048	2,150	2,404	2,534	2,877	3,034.16	3,088.29
Futureproof Wellington	Jenny Condie †	14.25%	1,935	1,948	1,985	2,044	2,125	2,513	2,812	2,943.87	2,984.36
Independent	Rachel Qi	11.68%	1,586	1,597	1,615	1,720	1,921	2,060			
Green	Robyn Parkinson	10.06%	1,366	1,378	1,397	1,429	1,501				
Independent	John Peters	7.68%	1,043	1,065	1,081	1,211					
Independent – Together for Wellington	Raveen Annamalai	4.80%	652	660	667						
Independent	James Sullivan	1.38%	188	199							
Real Issues for Real People	James Sales	1.10%	150								
Valid: 13,578 Spoilt: 594 Turnout: 40.95% (14,172 / 34,605)

==== Wharangi/Onslow-Western general ward ====
The Wharangi/Onslow-Western general ward returned three councillors to the city council.

2022 Wellington City Council – Wharangi/Onslow-Western General ward
Party	Candidate	FPv%	Count								
Party	Candidate	FPv%	1	2	3	4	5	6	7	8	9
Independent	Ray Chung	24.50%	4,192	4,202	4,238	4,401	4,400.80	4,379.83	4,463.13	4,508.21	4,242.52
Independent	Diane Calvert †	20.72%	3,545	3,553	3,561	3,623	3,791.26	3,972.66	4,396.77	4,673.63	4,222.24
Labour	Rebecca Matthews †	17.83%	3,051	3,063	3,085	3,109	3,178.10	3,355.43	3,514.46	4,017.68	4,219.26
Green	Lachlan Patterson	12.65%	2,164	2,199	2,230	2,239	2,290.88	2,465.39	2,570.48	3,001.64	3,110.73
Future Wellington	Kelvin Hastie	7.19%	1,230	1,238	1,255	1,277	1,362.90	1,521.71	1,724.24		
Independent	Heather Baldwin	5.50%	941	947	962	989	1,076.80	1,161.68			
Opportunities	Bob Mason	4.55%	779	793	799	808	873.08				
Independent	Ryan Bothma	3.29%	563	569	580	607					
Independent	Barbara McKenzie	2.12%	363	369	379						
Independent	Kush Bhargava	0.99%	169	173							
Independent	Alexander Garside	0.66%	113								
Valid: 17,110 Spoilt: 530 Turnout: 52.52% (17,641 / 33,591)

==== Pukehīnau/Lambton general ward ====
The Pukehīnau/Lambton general ward returned three councillors to the city council.

Incumbent Green Party councillor since 2007 Iona Pannett, who received the most votes in Pukehīnau Lambton Ward in 2019, was not reselected by the Green Party in April 2022, and ran as an independent. Incumbent councillor Tamatha Paul was elected as an independent in 2019, but in May 2022 announced she would seek the Green nomination, which she received in June.

2022 Wellington City Council – Pukehīnau/Lambton General ward
Party	Candidate	FPv%	Count									
Party	Candidate	FPv%	1	2	3	4	5	6	7	8	9	10
Green	Tamatha Paul †	41.67%	5,206	3,123.25	3,059.73	3,060.92	3,094.24	3,109.19	3,065.41	3,006.05	2,874.06	2,812.80
Independent	Nicola Young †	16.61%	2,075	2,137.01	2,150.45	2,180.61	2,193.25	2,245.88	2,438.23	3,209.25	2,870.46	2,813.97
Independent	Iona Pannett †	11.44%	1,429	1,783.05	1,799.06	1,843.84	1,907.10	2,083.11	2,441.14	2,654.67	2,806.04	2,841.87
Labour	Afnan Al-Rubayee	7.71%	963	1,752.33	1,783.59	1,807.36	1,942.39	2,168.72	2,380.57	2,585.03	2,693.71	2,731.13
Independent	Karl Tiefenbacher	9.25%	1156	1,192.40	1,205.42	1,275.77	1,299.78	1,345.81	1,504.14			
Independent	Jane O'Loughlin	5.50%	687	814.22	820.21	852.63	901.46	1,047.83				
Independent	Ellen Blake	3.63%	454	680.43	690.26	712.87	773.40					
Independent	Jonathan Markwick	1.65%	206	387.23	399.81	429.18						
Independent	Nicholas Hancox	1.97%	246	274.00	285.98							
1 Taxipooling off the Rank	Zan Rai Gyaw	0.57%	71	76.20								
Valid: 12,493 Spoilt: 479 Turnout: 40.37% (12,972 / 32,135)

==== Motukairangi/Eastern general ward ====
The Motukairangi/Eastern General ward returned three councillors to the city council.

Incumbent councillor Sarah Free ran as a Green candidate in previous elections, but announced in December 2021 that she would run as an independent in 2022. Incumbent councillor Sean Rush did not stand for re-election.

2022 Wellington City Council – Motukairangi/Eastern General ward
Party	Candidate	FPv%	Count						
Party	Candidate	FPv%	1	2	3	4	5	6	7
Labour	Teri O'Neill †	15.12%	1,980	1,982	1,996	2,076	2,132	2,281	3,387
Independent	Tim Brown	18.34%	2,402	2,409	2,461	2,566	2,805	3,100	3,199
Independent	Sarah Free †	18.07%	2,367	2,371	2,401	2,481	2,603	2,790	3,071
Independent	Steph Edlin	13.35%	1,749	1,753	1,782	1,871	2,045	2,271	2,512
Green	Luana Scowcroft	14.09%	1,846	1,853	1,860	1,869	1,895	1,982	
Independent	Ken Ah Kuoi	8.38%	1,098	1,103	1,126	1,189	1,289		
Independent	Nathan Meyer	5.27%	690	695	755	893			
Independent	Rob Goulden	4.60%	603	604	665				
Independent	Aaron Gilmore	2.38%	312	314					
Independent	Atul Prema	0.39%	51						
Valid: 13,098 Spoilt: 590 Turnout: 47.42% (13,688 / 28,868)

==== Paekawakawa/Southern general ward ====
The Paekawakawa/Southern general ward returned two councillors to the city council.

Incumbent Labour councillor Fleur Fitzsimons did not run again so she could run as the Labour candidate for the Rongotai electorate for the 2023 New Zealand general election, replacing Paul Eagle.

2022 Wellington City Council – Paekawakawa/Southern General ward
Party	Candidate	FPv%	Count									
Party	Candidate	FPv%	1	2	3	4	5	6	7	8	9	10
Green	Laurie Foon †	35.63%	4,499	4,078.00	4,092.34	4,096.95	4,078.96	4,057.60	3,961.05	4,208.47	3,972.71	3,929.31
Labour	Nureddin Abdurahman	19.94%	2,517	2,770.10	2,582.89	2,832.16	2,937.23	3,082.51	3,133.54	3,439.51	3,743.06	3,929.31
Independent	Paula Muollo	13.09%	1,653	1,670.96	1,712.22	1,760.98	1,840.39	1,975.63	1,981.13	2,024.71	2,281.70	2,891.58
Independent – Vision/Skill/Results	Chris Dudfield	8.38%	1,058	1,061.74	1,086.25	1,127.81	1,189.83	1,245.15	1,246.53	1,268.12	1,495.89	
Get Wellington Back on Course	Iain MacLeod	4.89%	617	625.23	640.17	660.36	716.91	783.94	786.49	805.77		
Action on Climate	Jonathan Coppard	4.03%	509	606.22	632.40	651.01	690.04	738.31	761.50			
Independent	Inoke Afeaki	3.68%	465	471.17	483.56	512.43	551.07					
Independent	Ate Moala	2.97%	375	392.59	417.61	439.40						
Independent #Together for Wellington	Dipak Bhana	2.28%	288	292.77	332.60							
Independent	Urmila Bhana	2.07%	253	262.17								
Valid: 12,234 Spoilt: 476 Turnout: 49.95% (12,710 / 25,447)

==== Te Whanganui-a-Tara Māori ward ====
Te Whanganui a Tara is a Māori ward created by Wellington City Council in 2021. The 2022 election returned Nīkau Wi-Neera as its first-ever councillor.

2022 Wellington City Council – Te Whanganui-a-Tara Māori ward
Party	Candidate	FPv%	Count	
Party	Candidate	FPv%	1	2
Green	Nīkau Wi Neera	40.89%	765	872
Labour	Matthew Reweti	36.45%	682	805
Independent	Ali Hamlin-Paenga	17.58%	329	
Valid: 1,776 Spoilt: 108 Turnout: 32.47% (1,884 / 5,803)

=== Tawa Community Board ===
The Tawa Community Board is made up of 2 councilors along with 6 representatives who are voted in by residents of Tawa, Grenada North and Takapu Valley.

2022 Tawa Community Board Election
Party	Candidate	FPv%	Count											
Party	Candidate	FPv%	1	2	3	4	5	6	7	8	9	10	11	12
Independent	Jill Day	38.25%	1606	599.86	592.93	480.32	586.28	581.93	586.75	593.33	571.16	563.48	560.00	557.78
Independent	Tim Davin	12.91%	542	671.68	587.47	591.75	593.58	583.26	596.14	598.30	575.94	565.41	561.46	558.62
Independent	Rachel Allan	10.38%	436	575.08	595.65	596.48	597.32	583.13	610.52	608.27	576.41	566.55	562.12	559.00
Independent	Miriam Moore	7.48%	314	464.98	472.49	480.32	489.57	493.99	527.50	595.11	578.00	566.14	562.09	558.96
Independent	Janryll Fernandez	6.74%	283	433.36	448.51	454.13	464.27	467.00	492.57	542.00	566.58	570.03	562.67	559.60
Independent	Jackson Lacy†	5.83%	245	414.15	421.92	430.53	439.72	443.95	457.87	506.96	530.94	543.65	551.48	537.29
Independent	Warwick Glendenning	6.91%	290	355.15	372.46	379.31	392.36	397.59	436.07	492.10	513.66	525.15	532.67	537.29
Independent	Clint Schoultz	4.22%	177	229.00	233.73	244.00	256.10	258.34	293.61					
Independent	Georgia Wilkinson	3.83%	161	192.95	198.13	204.46	236.25	238.74						
Independent	Brendon Green	2.10%	88	97.40	98.62	105.33								
Real Issues for Real People	James Sales	1.36%	57	67.65	69.06									
Valid: 4,199 Spoilt: 161 Turnout: 40.07% (4,360 /10,880)

=== Mākara / Ōhāriu Community Board ===
The Mākara / Ōhāriu Community Board is made up of 6 representatives voted in by residents of

Mākara, Mākara Beach and Ōhāriu. Seven candidates ran but John Apanowicz's candidacy was superseded by winning a seat on the council, leaving the remaining six candidates automatic winners.

2022 Mākara / Ōhāriu Community Board Election
Party	Candidate	FPv%	Count
Party	Candidate	FPv%	1
Independent	Mark Reed		N/A
Independent	Christine Grace†		N/A
Independent	Darren Hoskins†		N/A
Independent	Hamish Todd†		N/A
Independent	Chris Renner†		N/A
Independent	Wayne Rudd†		N/A

=== Hutt Mana Charitable Trust ===
The Hutt Mana Charitable Trust's board of trustees is composed of two trustees elected from Lower Hutt, one from Upper Hutt, one from Porirua and one from Wellington. The Wellington Trustee is only elected by residents north of Khandallah, Ngaio, Mākara and Mākara Beach.

2022 Hutt Mana Charitable Trust Wellington Trustee Election
Party	Candidate	FPv%	Count	
Party	Candidate	FPv%	1	2
Independent	Nick Leggett	45.17%	5,650	6,303
Independent	Peter Gilberd	41.50%	5,191	6,205
Independent	Tracy Hurst-Porter	20.37%	2,549	
Valid: 12,508 Spoilt: 574 Turnout: 37.34% (13,082 / 35,035)

== Aftermath ==
=== Committee chairs ===
Following the election. Labour and Green councillors gained control over the three major committees in the Wellington City Council.

Following a month of negotiations and restructuring, Whanau reduced the number of council committees from five to three. Labour councillor Rebecca Matthews became chair of the committee in charge of long term-planning, finance, and performance. Labour councillors Teri O'Neill and Nureddin Abdurahman became the chair and deputy chair of the social, cultural, and economic committee. In addition, Green councillor Tamatha Paul became chair of the new environment and infrastructure committee.

== See also ==
- 2022 Greater Wellington Regional Council election
- 2022 Porirua City Council election
- 2022 Hutt City Council election
- 2022 Upper Hutt City Council election
- 2022 Kāpiti Coast District Council election
- 2022 New Zealand local elections
