= Ruth Gotlieb =

New Zealand politician and community volunteer (1923–2019)

Ruth Gotlieb QSO
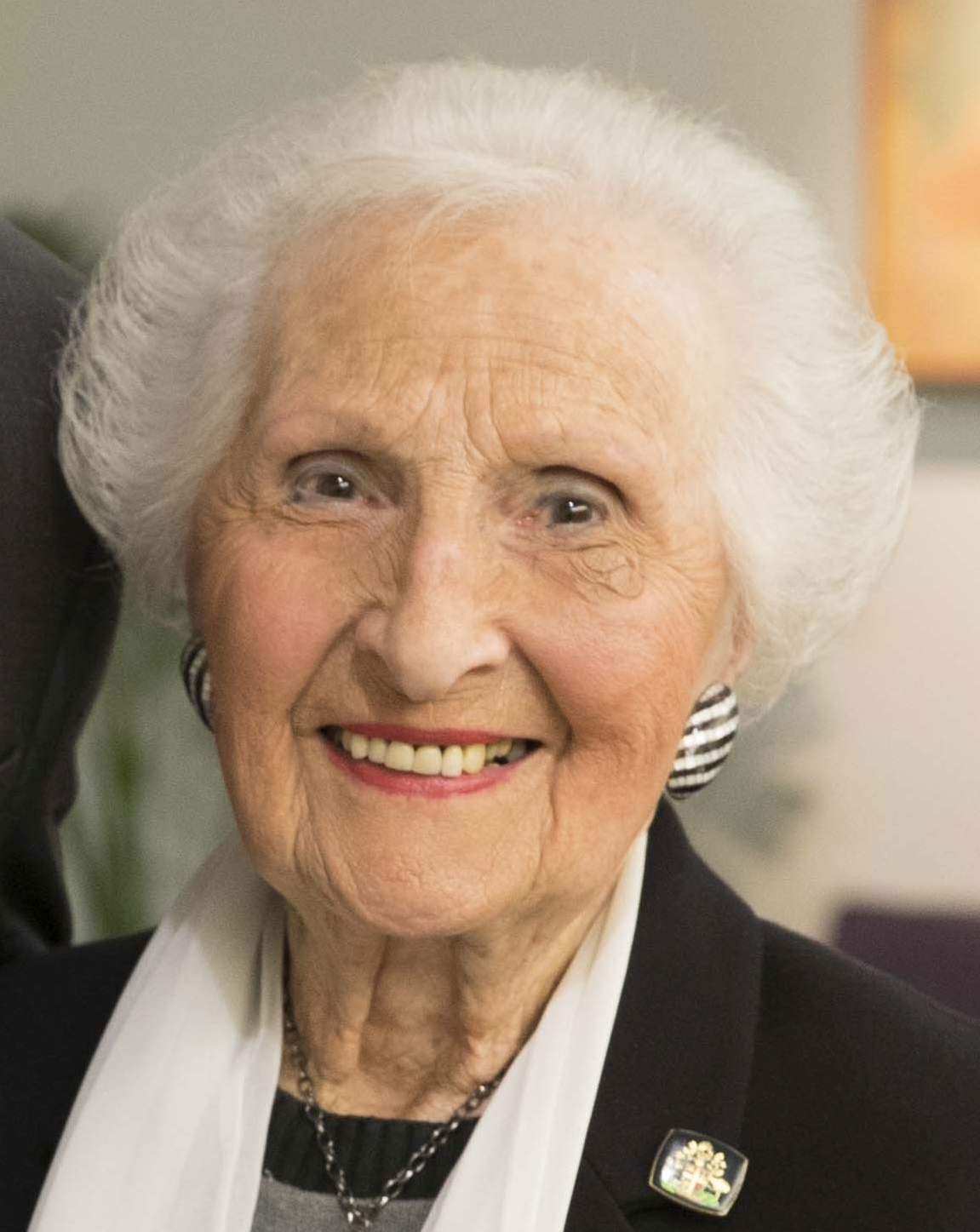
- Gotlieb in 2017

Wellington City Councillor for Eastern Ward
- In office 11 October 1986 – 13 October 2001
- Preceded by: ward established
- Succeeded by: David Major

Personal details
- Born: Ruth Wolman; 16 May 1923 England
- Died: 23 July 2019 (aged 96) Wellington, New Zealand
- Party: Independent
- Other political affiliations: National (past)
- Spouse: Gerald Gotlieb (m. 1951; died 2006)
- Children: 4

Ruth Gotlieb QSO (née Wolman, 16 May 1923 – 23 July 2019) was a local politician in Wellington, New Zealand, serving as a Wellington City Councillor from 1983 to 2001.

== Biography ==
=== Early life and career ===
Gotlieb was born in England on 16 May 1923, the daughter of Joseph and Reka Wolman. The family moved to Cork, Ireland, when her father was appointed a rabbi there. When she was a teenager she and her family moved again, to Brisbane, Australia, as her father had been appointed chief rabbi for the city. During World War II, Gotlieb joined the Signal Corps and became a Morse operator. In the 1940s, she moved to Wellington and started a pretzel business with her husband, Gerry Gotlieb, whom she married in 1951. The couple went on to have four children.

=== Political career ===
Gotlieb served on the Wellington City Council from 1983 to 2001, mostly representing the Eastern ward. She also served on the Greater Wellington Regional Council, the Wellington Harbour Board and the Capital and Coast District Health Board.

Gotlieb first ran for office in 1980 as part of the new "Rates Reform" ticket started by Bryan Weyburne. She polled much higher than the rest of the Rates Reform ticket but was unsuccessful. By the following election the Rates Reform movement had merged into the Citizens' Association and she was elected as councillor on the Citizens' ticket.

In 1986 Gotlieb was elected to the Eastern ward (previous elections had been at large). In 1987 she contested the National Party nomination for the electorate of Miramar (which encompassed the Eastern ward), but lost out to Ian Macfarlane, president of the Hutt Valley Chamber of Commerce. Gotlieb said that the selection process had been a "wonderful experience" and had been "vey glad" to be part of it.

Gotlieb was sacked from her part-time job as a private secretary to Ian Lockie, Rawleigh's Australia and New Zealand general manager, because she devoted "too much time" to being a councillor. Gotlieb said she did not blame the company and though she would like to say she resigned, she did not. She stated "I loved my little job, but I loved being a councillor more." Lockie stated "She would bend over backward to help and she was scrupulously fair", but the system could not work and in the end she was regrettably asked to go.

In 1992 she vied for the Citizens' nomination for mayor, but was beaten by former National MP Ken Comber. She then broke with the Citizens' Association and ran as an independent candidate. When announcing her candidature for the mayoralty she said "I expect to win. People know I won't make promises I can't keep and I will keep the promises I do make. I get things done and I care about this city." Citizens' Association president John Liddiard described Gotlieb as disloyal upon receiving her letter of resignation from the association. Liddiard expressed his doubts Gotlieb could win the mayoralty stating "I think she's made a big mistake, politically and personally." Gotlieb said she was furious with Liddiard's reaction stating "I am disgusted." She finished fifth with 10.23% of the vote, but was re-elected in the Eastern ward comfortably, remaining in this position until 2001, when she was succeeded by David Major.

During her career she was responsible for a number of achievements. She established the Wellington Youth Council, supported the opening of a mobile library service, pressed for the installation of a hydrotherapy pool at Kilbirnie Aquatic Centre, and contributed to the governance of the upgrade of Wellington Hospital. She was also heavily involved with the failed arts festival Sesqui 1990.

=== Later life and death ===
Organisations that Gotlieb volunteered for included Trade Aid, the Wellington branch of the Cancer Society of New Zealand, the Newtown Community Centre, Eva's Attic, Ronald McDonald House, and Mary Potter Hospice. In 2007 she made a failed attempt to re-enter politics, standing unsuccessfully in the Eastern ward.

Gotlieb died in Wellington on 23 July 2019, at the age of 96. She had been predeceased by her husband in 2006.

== Recognition ==
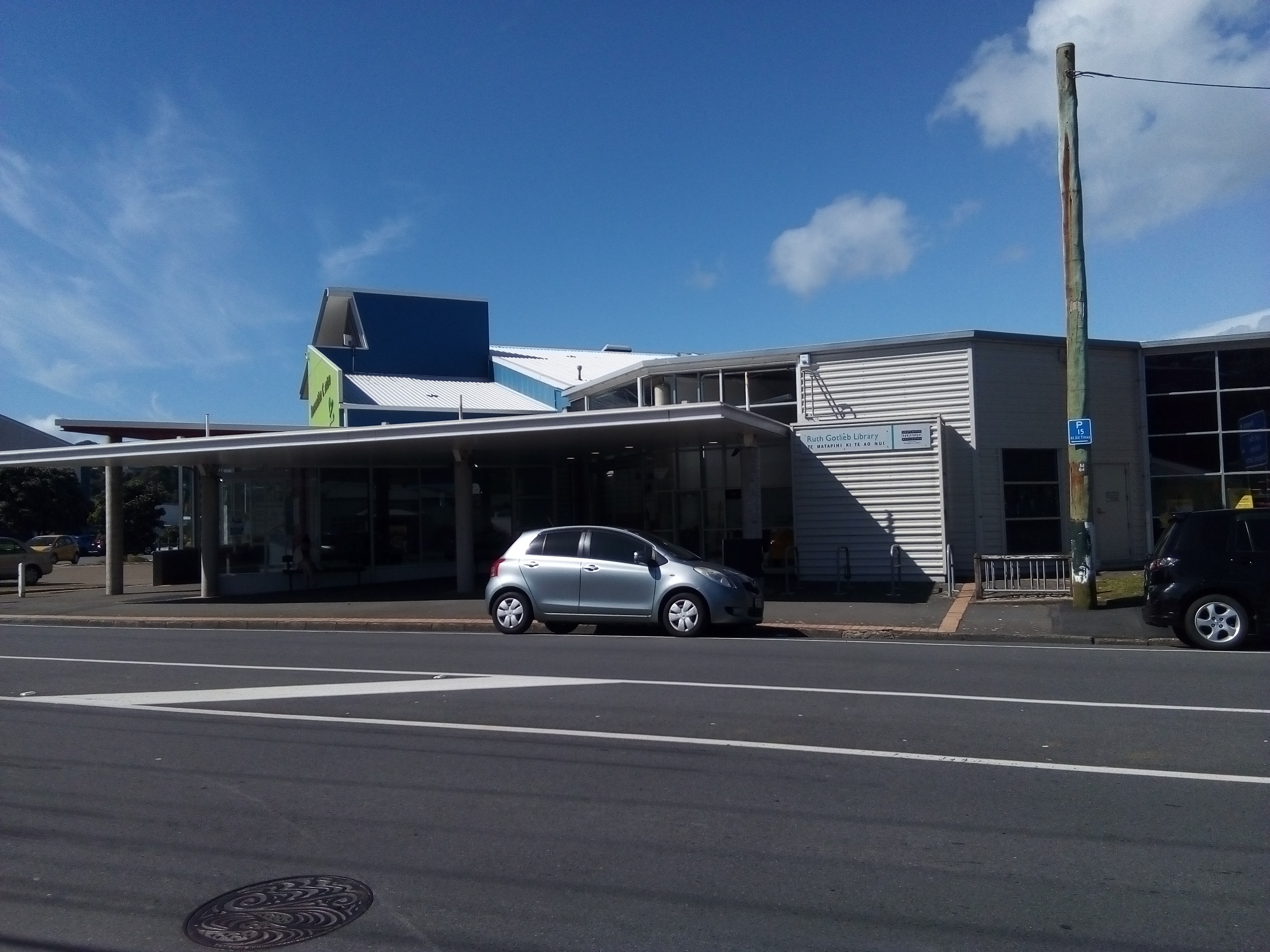
Ruth Gotlieb Library, Kilbirnie

In the 1995 New Year Honours, Gotlieb was appointed a Companion of the Queen's Service Order for public services. In 2000, the Wellington City Council named the Kilbirnie public library after her in recognition of her extensive contribution to library services. In 2010, she was named Wellingtonian of the Year.

Political offices
New title ward established	Wellington City Councillor for Eastern Ward; 1986–2001	Succeeded by David Major
