= Chris Parkin =

New Zealand businessman, art collector and philanthropist (born 1948)

Sir Chris Parkin KNZM
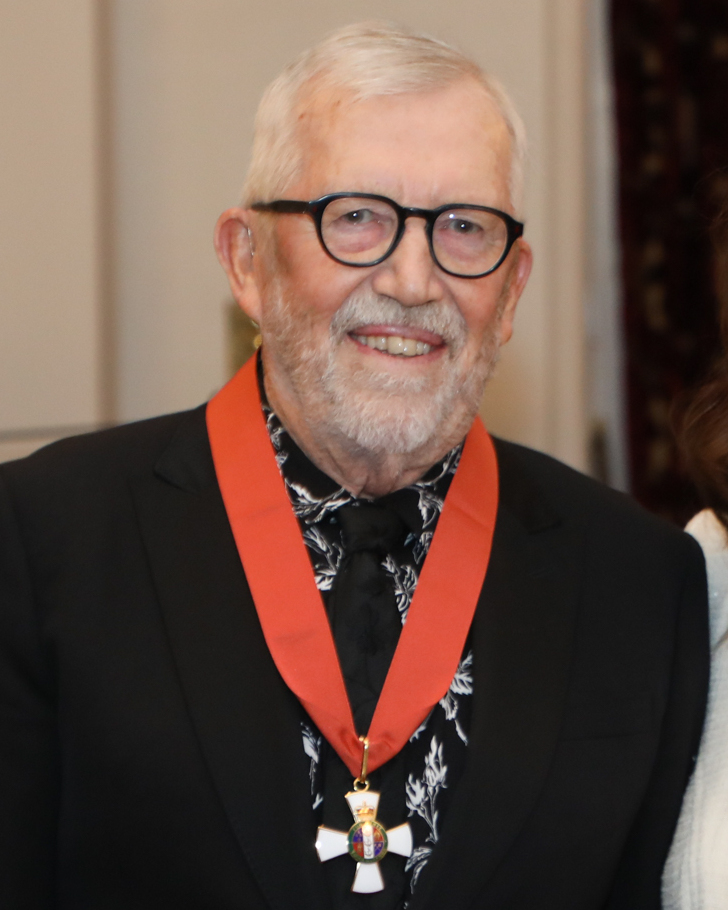
- Parkin in 2026
- Born: Christopher Wilton Parkin; 1948 (age 77–78); Doncaster, Yorkshire, England

Sir Christopher Wilton Parkin KNZM (born 1948) is a New Zealand businessman, art collector and philanthropist.

== Early life ==
Parkin was born in Doncaster, England in 1948 and emigrated to New Zealand with his family in 1952. He grew up in Waikanae and Ōtaki and attended Otaki College, graduating in 1966. He studied geochemistry and business at Victoria University of Wellington, graduating with a Master's degree with Honours and a Bachelor of Commerce.

== Career ==
Parkin bought his first property for $12,500 at age 23, while still a student. He sold it for $30,000 a few years later.

After graduating from university Parkin found work with a manufacturing business. Two years later he moved to Development Finance Corporation as a financial analyst, and later convinced his employer to open an office in San Francisco.

In 1979 Parkin and his second wife moved to California for his work as a business analyst. Parkin spent four years in the US marketing New Zealand's export tax incentives to US businesses. He returned from the US to Wellington in 1983 and invested in more property – blocks of apartments which he renovated and sold.

Parkin took over management of the Museum Hotel in October 1990 and bought the building from the Government in 1992. In 1993 he moved the hotel on rails to a new location in Cable Street. Parkin sold the hotel in 2015.

== Politics ==
Parkin had left-wing views when he started university, but after studying economics his views moved further right and he ended up as branch chairman for the ACT party in 1994. Parkin stated in 2020 that he was a socialist until he understood more about human nature. "You realise the futility of any political system that depends totally for its success on the goodwill of people towards others. It's human nature that stops socialism from ever succeeding. It doesn't have a chance."

Parkin was a Wellington city councillor for the Lambton Ward from 1995 to 2004, when he chose to stand down.

== Philanthropy ==
Parkin has been a board member of The Museum of New Zealand Te Papa Tongarewa and served in several charitable and public organisations including the St James Theatre Trust, Wellington Venues Ltd, the New Zealand Affordable Arts Trust and the Hannah Playhouse Trust.

In 2001 Parkin helped set up a scholarship to Toi Whakaari New Zealand Drama School. This was awarded annually until 2014, and covered a year's tuition fees plus a monthly allowance.

In 2005 Parkin gave $100,000 to the Wellington Sculpture Trust for a sculpture to be placed outside his Museum Hotel. The sculpture, Per Capita, was installed in December 2006.

In 2012 Parkin founded the Parkin Drawing Prize in association with the New Zealand Academy of Fine Arts. This national art competition is open to New Zealand citizens and permanent residents. The winner of the Parkin Drawing Prize receives $25,000, increased from $20,000 when the Prize was first awarded in 2013.

In 2019 Parkin gave $120,000 to Boosted, a crowdfunding platform for artists, to build a better site.

Also in 2019, Parkin donated $1 million towards a planned national music centre in Wellington's Civic Square. The donation included $250,000 for an artwork to be commissioned for the space.

== Honours and awards ==
Parkin was named 'Wellingtonian of the Year' in 1993 for his efforts to shift the Museum Hotel to a new location.

In 1995 Parkin was given an Award for Distinguished Service by Victoria University, for "outstanding contribution to the advancement of Victoria University of Wellington".

In the 2011 Queen's Birthday Honours, Parkin was appointed a Companion of the New Zealand Order of Merit, for services to business and the arts. In the 2026 New Year Honours, he was promoted to Knight Companion of the New Zealand Order of Merit, for services to philanthropy and the arts.

== Personal life ==
Parkin has been married three times and has two children with his second wife.
