= Results of the 2025 New Zealand territorial authority elections in Greater Wellington =

2025 New Zealand territorial authority elections (Greater Wellington)
- 11 October 2025
- Turnout: 188,763 (47.51% ▲3.22 pp)
- 8 of 8 local councils
Party	Councils	+/–
No majority	8	0
This lists parties that won seats. See the complete results below.
- 8 mayors and 84 local councillors
Party	Seats	+/–
Mayors
Independent	7	+1
Labour	1	0
Local councillors
Independent	69	0
Labour	8	+1
Green	5	+1
Independent Together	1	+1
Te Pāti Māori	1	+1
This lists parties that won seats. See the complete results below.

Elections for the territorial authorities of New Zealand were held from 9 September until 11 October 2025 as part of that year's nation-wide local elections. 709 local councillors and 66 mayors were elected across 66 of 67 councils.

8 territorial authorities are located within the Greater Wellington Region. 8 mayors and 84 district and city councillors were elected. 2 of 8 mayors were re-elected and no group gained or held a majority on any council.

== Maps ==

Legend
Independent hold	Independent gain
Labour hold	Labour gain
Green hold	Green gain
	Independent Together gain
	Te Pāti Māori gain

== Summary ==
=== Overall ===
Council	Electoral system	Seats	Mayor	Councillors	Control	Turnout	Details	Refs
Kāpiti Coast	STV	10	▌ Independent hold	▌ Independent 9 (▼1) ▌ Te Pāti Māori 1 (▲1)	▌ No majority	20,481; 46.91% ▲1.14 pp	Details	
Porirua	STV	10	▌ Independent hold	▌ Independent 8 ( 0) ▌ Labour 2 ( 0)	▌ No majority	17,623; 40.95% ▲3.61 pp	Details	
Upper Hutt	FPP	10	▌ Independent gain	▌ Independent 10 ( 0)	▌ No majority	16,728; 50.54% ▲6.59 pp	Details	
Lower Hutt	FPP	13	▌ Independent gain	▌ Independent 11 (▲3)	▌ No majority	33,037; 41.81% ▲0.81 pp	Details	
Wellington	STV	15	▌ Labour gain	▌ Independent 5 (▼3) ▌ Labour 5 (▲1) ▌ Green 4 (▲1) ▌ Independent Together 1 (▲1)	▌ No majority	81,574; 50.57% ▲5.03 pp	Details	
Masterton	FPP	8	▌ Independent gain	▌ Independent 8 ( 0)	▌ No majority	9,564; 47.56% ▼0.20 pp	Details	
Carterton	FPP	8	▌ Independent gain	▌ Independent 8 ( 0)	▌ No majority	4,159; 53.89% ▼6.78 pp	Details	
South Wairarapa	FPP	10	▌ Independent gain	▌ Independent 10 (▲1)	▌ No majority	5,597; 59.89% ▲4.43 pp	Details	
8 of 8 councils		84						

=== Mayors ===
Territorial authority	Incumbent	Elected	Runner-up	Details	Refs
Kāpiti Coast	Janet Holborow (Ind)		Rob McCann (Ind)	Details	
Porirua	Anita Baker (Ind)		Kathleen Filo (Ind)	Details	
Upper Hutt	Wayne Guppy (Ind)	Peri Zee (Ind)	Wayne Guppy (Ind)	Details	
Lower Hutt	Campbell Barry^{R} (Labour)	Ken Laban (Ind)	Brady Dyer (Ind)	Details	
Wellington	Tory Whanau^{R} (Ind Green)	Andrew Little (Labour)	Karl Tiefenbacher (Ind)	Details	
Masterton	Gary Caffell^{R} (Ind)	Bex Johnson (Ind)	Stella Lennox (Ind)	Details	
Carterton	Ron Mark^{R} (Ind)	Steve Cretney (Ind)	Brian Deller (Ind)	Details	
South Wairarapa	Martin Connelly^{R} (Ind)	Fran Wilde (Ind)	Leah Hawkins (Ind)	Details	
^{R} did not run for re-election

=== Candidates ===
Party / ticket	Mayors				Councillors			
Party / ticket	2022	Candidates	Elected	+/−	2022	Candidates	Elected	+/−
Independent	5	34	6	▲1	70	170	69	▼1
Labour	1	1	1	0	7	9	8	▲1
Green	no candidates				3	8	4	▲1
Independent Green	1	0	0	▼1	1	1	1	0
Independent Together	(new)	1	0	0	(new)	6	1	▲1
Te Pāti Māori	no candidates				0	1	1	▲1
ACT Local	no candidates				(new)	4	0	0
We Love Kāpiti	(new)	1	0	0	(new)	6	0	0
Silly Hat	(new)	1	0	0	no candidates			
Seats:	7		7	0	81		84	▲3

== Kāpiti Coast District Council ==
2025 Kāpiti Coast District Council election
- 11 October 2025
- Turnout: 20,481 (46.91% ▲1.14 pp)
- Mayor
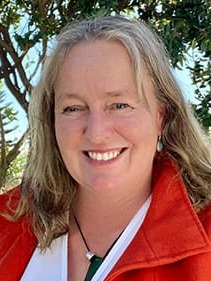
		Ind	Ind
Candidate	Janet Holborow	Rob McCann	Liz Koh
Party	Independent	Independent	Independent
Primary vote	6,721	4,744	3,027
Percentage	32.82%	23.16%	14.78%
Final vote	8,676	7,606	excluded
Percentage	53.29%	46.71%
	WLK	Ind	Ind
Candidate	Dean Harris	Martin Halliday	Kim Hobson
Party	We Love Kāpiti	Independent	Independent
Primary vote	2,291	1,976	1,345
Percentage	11.19%	9.65%	6.57%
Final vote	excluded	excluded	excluded
Mayor before election
Janet Holborow
Independent
Elected mayor
Janet Holborow
Independent
- Councillors
- 10 seats on the governing body of Kāpiti Coast District Council; 6 seats needed for a majority
Party	Seats	+/–
Independent	9	−1
Te Pāti Māori	1	+1
This lists parties that won seats. See the complete results below.
Control before	Control after
No majority	No majority

=== 2025 Kāpiti Coast mayoral election ===
2025 Kāpiti Coast mayoral election
Party	Candidate	Primary votes	%	±%	Iteration	
Party	Candidate	Primary votes	%	±%	#	Votes
Independent	Janet Holborow^{†}	6,721	32.82	+4.73	5th	8,676
Independent	Rob McCann	4,744	23.16	−0.10	5th	7,606
Independent	Liz Koh	3,027	14.78	(new)	4th	3,910
We Love Kāpiti	Dean Harris	2,291	11.19	(new)	3rd	2,649
Independent	Martin Halliday	1,976	9.65	−5.28	2nd	2,154
Independent	Kim Hobson	1,345	6.57	(new)	1st	1,345
Quota		10,052	49.08	−0.29		
Informal votes		27	0.13	−0.11		
Blank votes		350	1.71	+0.59		
Turnout		20,481	46.91	+1.14		
Registered electors		43,664				
Independent hold on 5th iteration						
^{†} incumbent

=== District-wide ward ===
2025 Kāpiti Coast district-wide ward election
Party	Candidate	Primary votes	%	±%	Iteration	
Party	Candidate	Primary votes	%	±%	#	Votes
Independent	Rob McCann	4,449	21.72	(new)	7th	6,273
Independent	Liz Koh^{†}	4,209	20.55	−0.64	8th	5,773
Independent	Lawrence Paul Kirby^{†}	4,053	19.79	+7.91	8th	5,353
We Love Kāpiti	Joanne Welch	2,186	10.67	(new)	6th	2,804
Independent	Gavin Welsh	1,568	7.66	(new)	5th	2,016
Independent	Jackie Elliott	1,308	6.39	−2.98	4th	1,545
Independent	Jo Turner	851	4.16	(new)	3rd	952
Independent	Grant Bartlett	531	2.59	(new)	2nd	548
Independent	Marek Willis	437	2.13	(new)	1st	437
Quota		6,531	31.89	+8.18		
Informal votes		147	0.72	−0.15		
Blank votes		742	3.62	+0.29		
Turnout		20,481	46.91	+1.14		
Registered electors		43,664				
Independent gain from Independent on 7th iteration						
Independent hold on 8th iteration						
^{†} incumbent

=== Ōtaki general ward ===
2025 Ōtaki general ward election
Party	Candidate	Primary votes	%	±%	Iteration	
Party	Candidate	Primary votes	%	±%	#	Votes
Independent	Heniti Buick	973	34.47	(new)	4th	1,369
Independent	Rob Kofoed	557	19.73	(new)	4th	937
Independent	Cam Butler	494	17.50	(new)	3rd	665
Independent	Shelly Warwick^{†}	465	16.47	−39.88	2nd	496
We Love Kāpiti	Brent Frogley	300	10.63	(new)	1st	300
Quota		1,395	49.42	+1.17		
Informal votes		2	0.07	−0.05		
Blank votes		32	1.13	−2.25		
Turnout		2,823	50.28	+11.12		
Registered electors		5,615				
Independent gain from Independent on 4th iteration						
^{†} incumbent

=== Waikanae general ward ===
2025 Waikanae general ward election
Party	Candidate	Primary votes	%	±%	Iteration	
Party	Candidate	Primary votes	%	±%	#	Votes
Independent	Steven Botica	1,079	17.12	(new)	7th	1,710
Independent	Jocelyn Louise Prvanov^{†}	1,071	17.00	−14.68	7th	1,773
Independent	Nigel Wilson^{†}	872	13.84	−15.33	7th	1,502
Independent	Michael Moore	669	10.62	(new)	6th	978
We Love Kāpiti	Dean Harris	601	9.54	(new)	5th	876
Independent	Chris MacLean	607	9.63	(new)	4th	760
Independent	Phil Byrne	490	7.78	(new)	3rd	579
Independent	Peter Bollmann	398	6.32	(new)	2nd	408
We Love Kāpiti	Martin Frauenstein	257	4.08	(new)	1st	257
Quota		2,015	31.98	+0.42		
Informal votes		55	0.87	+0.46		
Blank votes		202	3.21	−1.85		
Turnout		6,301	51.12	−0.69		
Registered electors		12,326				
Independent gain from Independent on 7th iteration						
Independent hold on 7th iteration						
^{†} incumbent

=== Paraparaumu general ward ===
2025 Paraparaumu general ward election
Party	Candidate	Primary votes	%	±%	Iteration	
Party	Candidate	Primary votes	%	±%	#	Votes
Independent	Martin Halliday^{†}	1,353	18.68	−3.29	7th	1,750
Independent	Glen Cooper^{†}	1,229	16.97	−3.19	7th	1,632
Independent	Glen Olsen	730	10.08	(new)	11th	1,516
Independent	Fiona Vining	738	10.19	(new)	11th	1,348
We Love Kāpiti	Chris Harwood	693	9.57	(new)	8th	939
Independent	Euon Murrell	593	8.19	(new)	6th	778
Independent	Paul Baggott	537	7.41	(new)	5th	627
Independent	Bernie Randall	351	4.85	−3.93	4th	398
Independent	Murray Lobb	330	4.56	−8.14	3rd	362
Independent	Dave Freeman	272	3.76	(new)	2nd	278
Independent	Mark Robert Souness	66	0.91	(new)	1st	66
Quota		1,723	23.79	−0.07		
Informal votes		45	0.62	−0.10		
Blank votes		306	4.22	+0.11		
Turnout		7,243	42.82	−0.46		
Registered electors		16,914				
Independent hold on 7th iteration						
Independent hold on 7th iteration						
Independent gain from Independent on 11th iteration						
^{†} incumbent

=== Paekākāriki-Raumati general ward ===
2025 Paekākāriki-Raumato general ward election
Party	Candidate	Primary votes	%	±%	Iteration	
Party	Candidate	Primary votes	%	±%	#	Votes
Independent	Bede John Laracy	1,438	48.42	(new)	1st	1,438
Independent	Zelda Emmeline Edwards	842	28.35	(new)	1st	842
Independent	Richard Young	570	19.19	−9.94	1st	570
Quota		1,425	47.98	+0.02		
Informal votes		2	0.07	−0.03		
Blank votes		118	3.97	−0.01		
Turnout		2,970	48.90	+0.97		
Registered electors		6,073				
Independent gain from Independent on 1st iteration						

=== Kāpiti Coast Māori ward ===
2025 Kāpiti Coast Māori ward election
Party	Candidate	Primary votes	%	±%	Iteration	
Party	Candidate	Primary votes	%	±%	#	Votes
Te Pāti Māori	Himiona Nehua Grace	418	36.54	(new)	5th	514
Independent	Deanne Rudd	432	37.76	(new)	5th	507
Independent	Rangi Halbert	99	8.65	(new)	4th	127
We Love Kāpiti	Brian Ruawai-Hamilton	75	6.56	(new)	3rd	81
Independent	Jason Thurston	60	5.24	(new)	2nd	62
Independent	Jordon Wansbrough	33	2.88	(new)	1st	33
Quota		559	48.86	n/a		
Informal votes		6	0.52	n/a		
Blank votes		21	1.84	n/a		
Turnout		1,144	41.81	n/a		
Registered electors		2,736				
Te Pāti Māori win (new seat) on 5th iteration						

=== Referendum on Māori wards ===
Choice	Votes	%
I vote to KEEP Māori wards	10,790	57.57
I vote to REMOVE Māori wards	7,952	42.43
Total	18,742	100.00
Valid votes	18,742	91.51
Invalid votes	12	0.06
Blank votes	1,727	8.43
Total votes	20,481	100.00
Registered voters/turnout	43,664	46.91
Source: electionz.com & MCERT

== Porirua City Council ==
2025 Porirua City Council election
- 11 October 2025
- Turnout: 17,623 (40.95% ▲3.61 pp)
- Mayor
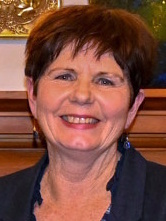
		Ind	Ind
Candidate	Anita Baker	Kathleen Filo	Ura Wilson-Pokoati
Party	Independent	Independent	Independent
Primary vote	8,517	7,225	1,565
Percentage	48.33%	41.00%	8.88%
Final vote	8,935	8,033	excluded
Percentage	52.60%	47.29%
Mayor before election
Anita Baker
Independent
Elected mayor
Anita Baker
Independent
- Councillors
- 10 seats on the governing body of Porirua City Council; 6 seats needed for a majority
Party	Seats	+/–
Independent	8	0
Labour	2	0
This lists parties that won seats. See the complete results below.
Control before	Control after
No majority	No majority

=== 2025 Porirua mayoral election ===
2025 Porirua mayoral election
Party	Candidate	Primary votes	%	±%	Iteration	
Party	Candidate	Primary votes	%	±%	#	Votes
Independent	Anita Baker^{†}	8,517	48.33	−20.55	2nd	8,935
Independent	Kathleen Filo	7,225	41.00	(new)	2nd	8,033
Independent	Ura Wilson-Pokoati	1,565	8.88	+1.55	1st	1,565
Quota		8,654	49.11	+0.59		
Informal votes		39	0.22	−0.19		
Blank votes		277	1.57	−1.05		
Turnout		17,623	40.95	+3.61		
Registered electors		43,032				
Independent hold on 2nd iteration						
^{†} incumbent

=== Pāuatahanui general ward ===
2025 Pāuatahanui general ward election
Party	Candidate	Primary votes	%	±%	Iteration	
Party	Candidate	Primary votes	%	±%	#	Votes
Labour	Josh Trlin^{†}	1,455	18.30	−7.81	3rd	1,774
Independent	Nathan Waddle^{†}	1,283	16.13	−0.70	5th	1,668
Independent	Moira Lawler	1,139	14.32	(new)	5th	1,576
Independent	Ross Leggett^{†}	1,244	15.64	−4.47	5th	1,576
ACT Local	Phill Houlihan	829	10.43	(new)	5th	1,170
Independent	Brent Ching	679	8.54	−1.54	4th	872
Green	Aditi Tiwari	614	7.72	(new)	2nd	639
Independent	Paul Nation	605	7.61	(new)	1st	605
Quota		1,570	19.74	+0.01		
Informal votes		18	0.23	−0.38		
Blank votes		86	1.08	−0.01		
Turnout		7,952	46.82	+1.01		
Registered electors		16,986				
Labour hold on 3rd iteration						
Independent hold on 5th iteration						
Independent gain from Independent on 5th iteration						
Independent hold on 5th iteration						
^{†} incumbent

=== Onepoto general ward ===
2025 Onepoto general ward election
Party	Candidate	Primary votes	%	±%	Iteration	
Party	Candidate	Primary votes	%	±%	#	Votes
Independent	Kathleen Filo^{†}	1,684	21.90	+16.16	1st	1,684
Labour	Geoff Hayward^{†}	1,337	17.39	+6.42	1st	1,337
Independent	Mike Duncan^{†}	903	11.74	−5.75	13th	1,221
Independent	Izzy Ford^{†}	863	11.22	−4.91	17th	1,282
Independent	Hemi Fermanis	515	6.70	(new)	22nd	1,146
Independent	Moze Galo^{†}	345	4.49	+0.64	22nd	981
Green	Zac Painting	336	4.37	(new)	19th	589
Independent	Ura Wilson-Pokoati	267	3.47	+1.25	16th	479
Independent	Jaistone Finau	324	4.21	(new)	13th	421
Independent	Chris Ellis	291	3.78	(new)	11th	393
Independent	Yan Zhang	280	3.64	(new)	8th	341
Independent	Siobhan Samuel	179	2.33	(new)	6th	219
Independent	Miriam Albert	85	1.11	(new)	5th	109
Independent	Angel Domingos	56	0.73	(new)	4th	70
Independent	Sharon Hilling	43	0.56	(new)	3rd	54
Quota		1,251	16.27	+0.02		
Informal votes		72	0.94	−1.47		
Blank votes		109	1.42	+0.07		
Turnout		7,690	36.60	+3.61		
Registered electors		21,009				
Independent hold on 1st iteration						
Labour hold on 1st iteration						
Independent hold on 13th iteration						
Independent hold on 17th iteration						
Independent gain from Independent on 22nd iteration						
^{†} incumbent

=== Parirua Māori ward ===
2025 Parirua Māori ward election
Party	Candidate	Primary votes	%	±%	Iteration	
Party	Candidate	Primary votes	%	±%	#	Votes
Independent	Kylie Wihapi^{†}	746	37.66	−12.68	3rd	936
Independent	Jess Te Huia	710	35.84	(new)	3rd	925
Independent	Raniera (Daniel) Albert	276	13.93	(new)	2nd	319
Independent	Rawinia Rimene	208	10.50	(new)	1st	208
Quota		970	48.97	−0.09		
Informal votes		12	0.61	+0.44		
Blank votes		28	1.41	−0.38		
Turnout		1,981	39.33	+13.69		
Registered electors		5,037				
Independent hold on 3rd iteration						
^{†} incumbent

=== Referendum on Māori wards ===
Choice	Votes	%
I vote to KEEP Māori wards	11,775	69.20
I vote to REMOVE Māori wards	5,240	30.80
Total	17,015	100.00
Valid votes	17,015	96.55
Invalid votes	3	0.02
Blank votes	605	3.43
Total votes	17,623	100.00
Registered voters/turnout	43,032	40.95
Source: electionz.com & MCERT

=== Referendum on amalgamation ===
Choice	Votes	%
Yes (pro-amalgamation)	9,581	56.43
No (anti-amalgamation)	7,399	43.57
Total	16,980	100.00
Valid votes	16,980	96.35
Invalid votes	4	0.02
Blank votes	639	3.63
Total votes	17,623	100.00
Registered voters/turnout	43,032	40.95
Source: electionz.com & MCERT

== Upper Hutt City Council ==
2025 Upper Hutt City Council election
- 11 October 2025
- Turnout: 16,728 (50.54% ▲6.59 pp)
- Mayor
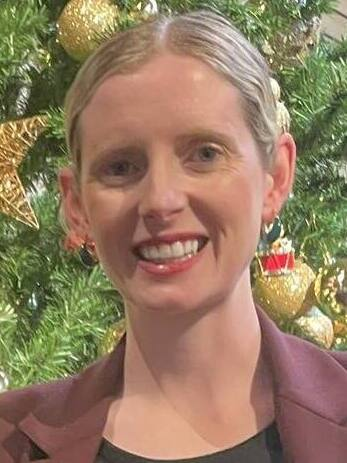

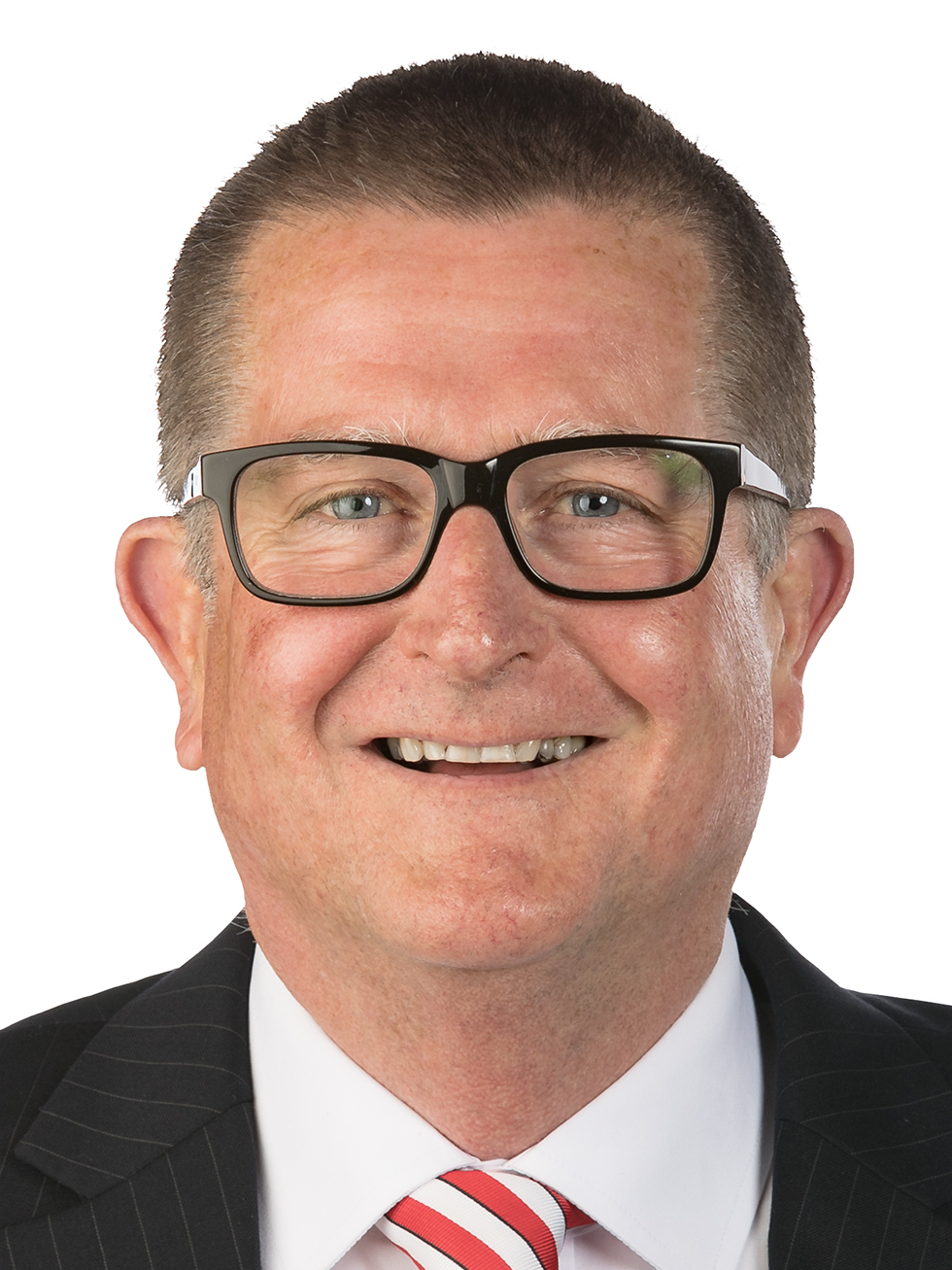

Candidate	Peri Zee	Wayne Guppy	Angela McLeod
Party	Independent	Independent	Independent
Popular vote	5,479	3,931	1,941
Percentage	32.75%	23.50%	11.60%
	Ind	Ind	Ind
Candidate	Blair Griffiths	Emma Holderness	Hellen Swales
Party	Independent	Independent	Independent
Popular vote	1,892	1,892	1,511
Percentage	11.31%	11.02%	9.03%
Mayor before election
Wayne Guppy
Independent
Elected mayor
Peri Zee
Independent
- Councillors
- 10 seats on the governing body of Upper Hutt City Council; 6 seats needed for a majority
Party	Seats	+/–
Independent	10	0
This lists parties that won seats. See the complete results below.
Control before	Control after
No majority	No majority

=== 2025 Upper Hutt mayoral election ===
2025 Upper Hutt mayoral election
Party	Candidate	Votes	%	±%
Independent	Peri Zee	5,479	32.75	(new)
Independent	Wayne Guppy^{†}	3,931	23.50	−17.18
Independent	Angela McLeod	1,941	11.60	(new)
Independent	Blair Griffiths	1,892	11.31	+1.89
Independent	Emma Holderness	1,843	11.02	(new)
Independent	Hellen Swales	1,511	9.03	−0.50
Informal votes		15	0.09	−0.08
Blank votes		116	0.69	−0.18
Turnout		16,728	50.54	+6.59
Registered electors		33,100		
Independent gain from Independent				
^{†} incumbent

=== Upper Hutt at-large ===
2025 Upper Hutt City Council election
Party	Candidate	Votes	%	±%
Independent	Emma Holderness^{†}	9,251	55.30	+10.92
Independent	Tracey Ultra^{†}	7,903	47.24	+3.15
Independent	Angela McLeod	7,651	45.74	(new)
Independent	Dave Wheeler^{†}	6,836	40.87	−10.82
Independent	Corey White	6,807	40.69	(new)
Independent	Hellen Swales^{†}	6,424	38.40	−11.98
Independent	Bill Hammond^{†}	6,117	36.57	−7.99
Independent	Daniel Welch	5,963	35.65	(new)
Independent	Matt Carey^{†}	5,892	35.22	−9.82
Independent	Gurpreet Dhillon	5,777	34.53	(new)
Independent	Tofa Gush	5,710	34.13	(new)
Independent	Euan Andrews	5,552	33.19	(new)
Independent	Henry Grey	5,381	32.17	(new)
Independent	Rachel Tukaki	5,182	30.98	(new)
Independent	Brett Thomson	5,029	30.06	(new)
Independent	Kylie McKenna	4,565	27.29	(new)
Independent	Heather Newell^{†}	4,248	25.39	−20.78
Independent	Dave Burt	3,853	23.03	(new)
Independent	Wade Cashmore	3,760	22.48	(new)
Independent	Ramil Adhikari	3,733	22.32	−5.84
Independent	Michael J Anderson	3,460	20.68	−1.56
Independent	David (DJ) McNicholas	3,164	18.91	(new)
Independent	Teresa Homan	3,087	18.45	−11.35
Independent	Heather Blissett	2,878	17.20	(new)
Independent	Nigel Mander	2,844	17.00	+8.40
Informal votes		51	0.30	+0.01
Blank votes		172	1.03	−0.52
Turnout		16,728	50.54	+6.59
Registered electors		33,100		
Independent hold				
Independent hold				
Independent gain from Independent				
Independent hold				
Independent gain from Independent				
Independent hold				
Independent hold				
Independent gain from Independent				
Independent hold				
Independent gain from Independent				
^{†} incumbent

== Hutt City Council ==
2025 Hutt City Council election
- 11 October 2025
- Turnout: 33,037 (41.81% ▲0.81 pp)
- Mayor
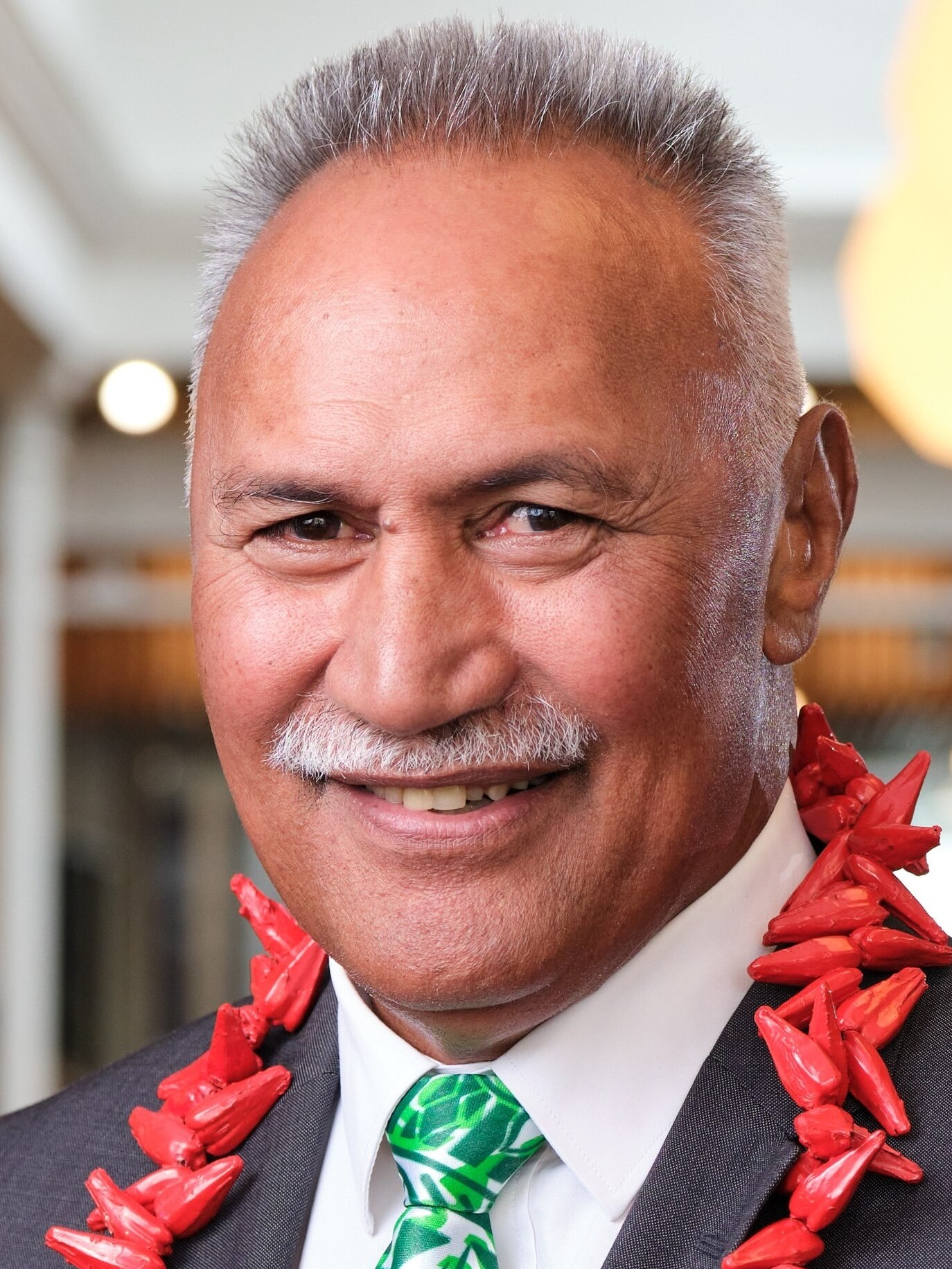

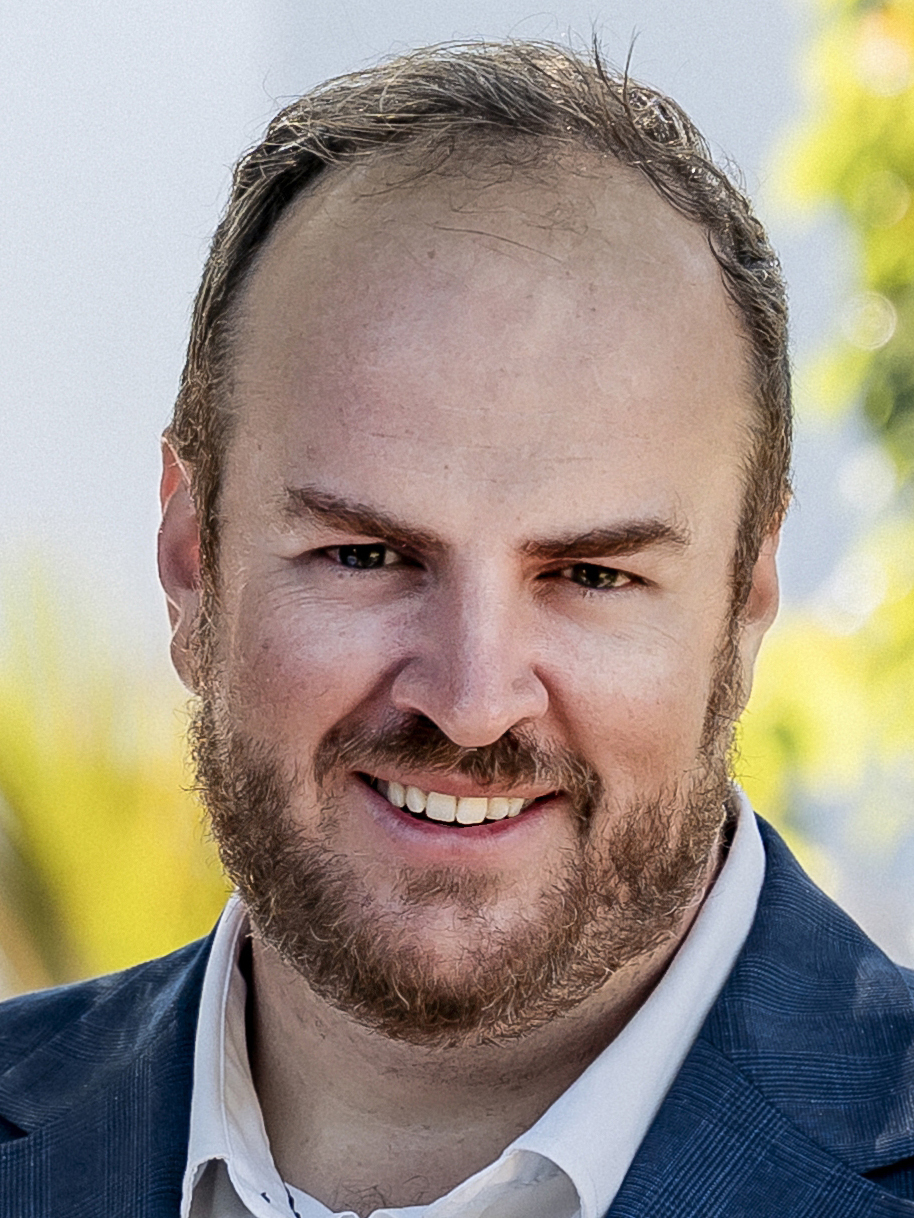
Candidate	Ken Laban	Brady Dyer
Party	Independent	Independent
Popular vote	11,282	9,068
Percentage	34.15%	27.45%
	Ind	Ind
Candidate	Karen Morgan	Prabha Ravi
Party	Independent	Independent
Popular vote	7,454	4,807
Percentage	22.56%	14.55%
Mayor before election
Campbell Barry
Labour
Elected mayor
Ken Laban
Independent
- Councillors
- 13 seats on the governing body of Hutt City Council; 7 seats needed for a majority
Party	Seats	+/–
Independent	11	+3
Labour	1	0
Independent Green	1	0
This lists parties that won seats. See the complete results below.
Control before	Control after
No majority	No majority

=== 2025 Lower Hutt mayoral election ===
2025 Lower Hutt mayoral election
Party	Candidate	Votes	%	±%
Independent	Ken Laban	11,282	34.15	(new)
Independent	Brady Dyer	9,068	27.45	(new)
Independent	Karen Morgan	7,454	22.56	(new)
Independent	Prabha Ravi	4,807	14.55	(new)
Informal votes		77	0.23	+0.14
Blank votes		349	1.06	−1.71
Turnout		33,037	41.81	+0.81
Registered electors		79,026		
Independent gain from Labour				

=== Lower Hutt at-large ===
2025 Lower Hutt at-large election
Party	Candidate	Votes	%	±%
Independent	Brady Dyer^{†}	19,233	58.22	+21.50
Independent	Prabha Ravi	16,753	50.71	+28.15
Independent	Tony Stallinger^{†}	15,653	47.38	+1.51
Independent	Karen (Kaz) Yung	13,449	40.71	+8.81
Independent	Mele Tonga-Grant	10,602	32.09	(new)
Independent	Kath McGuinness	10,064	30.46	(new)
Independent	Andrew Gavriel	9,744	29.49	(new)
Independent	Suzanne Levy	8,859	26.82	(new)
Independent	Semi Kuresa	8,478	25.66	(new)
Independent	Sherry Antony	8,206	24.84	(new)
Independent	Jonathon Gilbert	5,826	17.63	(new)
Independent	Chris Paul	4,425	13.39	(new)
Informal votes		127	0.38	−0.25
Blank votes		732	2.22	+0.39
Turnout		33,037	41.81	+0.81
Registered electors		79,026		
Independent hold				
Independent gain from Independent				
Independent gain from United Hutt				
Independent gain from Independent				
Independent gain from Independent				
^{†} incumbent

=== Western general ward ===
2025 Western general ward election
Party	Candidate	Votes	%	±%
Independent Green	Chris Parkin^{†}	2,261	51.75	+3.67
Independent	Robbie Schneider	1,935	44.29	(new)
Informal votes		1	0.02	−0.07
Blank votes		172	3.94	−0.30
Turnout		4,369	43.49	−0.66
Registered electors		10,045		
Independent Green hold				
^{†} incumbent

=== Harbour general ward ===
2025 Harbour general ward election
Party	Candidate	Votes	%	±%
Independent	Tui Lewis^{†}	elected unopposed		
Registered electors		11,392		
Independent hold				
^{†} incumbent

=== Northern general ward ===
2025 Northern general ward election
Party	Candidate	Votes	%	±%
Independent	Andy Mitchell	elected unopposed		
Independent	Naomi Shaw^{†}	elected unopposed		
Registered electors		18,906		
Independent win (new seat)				
Independent hold				
^{†} incumbent

=== Central general ward ===
2025 Central general ward election
Party	Candidate	Votes	%	±%
Independent	Simon Edwards	3,792	44.73	(new)
Independent	Glenda Barratt^{†}	2,307	27.21	−18.68
Independent	Paki Maaka	2,177	25.68	(new)
Independent	George Mckay	1,865	22.00	(new)
Green	Neelu Jennings	1,810	21.35	(new)
Independent	Rodney Cook	1,761	20.77	(new)
Independent	Tim McNamara	1,340	15.81	(new)
Informal votes		35	0.41	+0.20
Blank votes		358	4.22	−1.22
Turnout		8,478	43.68	−0.42
Registered electors		19,409		
Independent win (new seat)				
Independent hold				
^{†} incumbent

=== Wainuiomata general ward ===
2025 Wainuiomata general ward election
Party	Candidate	Votes	%	±%
Labour	Keri Brown^{†}	elected unopposed		
Registered electors		12,032		
Labour hold				
^{†} incumbent

=== Mana Kairangi ki Tai Māori ward ===
2025 Mana Kairangi ki Tai Māori ward election
Party	Candidate	Votes	%	±%
Independent	Te Awa Puketapu	elected unopposed		
Registered electors		7,242		
Independent win (new seat)				

=== Referendum on Māori wards ===
Choice	Votes	%
I vote to KEEP Māori wards	19,976	63.09
I vote to REMOVE Māori wards	11,688	36.91
Total	31,664	100.00
Valid votes	31,664	95.84
Invalid votes	4	0.01
Blank votes	1,369	4.14
Total votes	33,037	100.00
Registered voters/turnout	79,026	41.81
Source: electionz.com & MCERT

=== Referendum on amalgamation ===
Choice	Votes	%
Yes (pro-amalgamation)	17,429	54.96
No (anti-amalgamation)	14,283	45.04
Total	31,712	100.00
Valid votes	31,712	95.99
Invalid votes	1	0.00
Blank votes	1,324	4.01
Total votes	33,037	100.00
Registered voters/turnout	79,026	41.81
Source: electionz.com & MCERT

== Wellington City Council ==
2025 Wellington City Council election
- 11 October 2025
- Turnout: 81,574 (50.57% ▲5.03 pp)
- Mayor
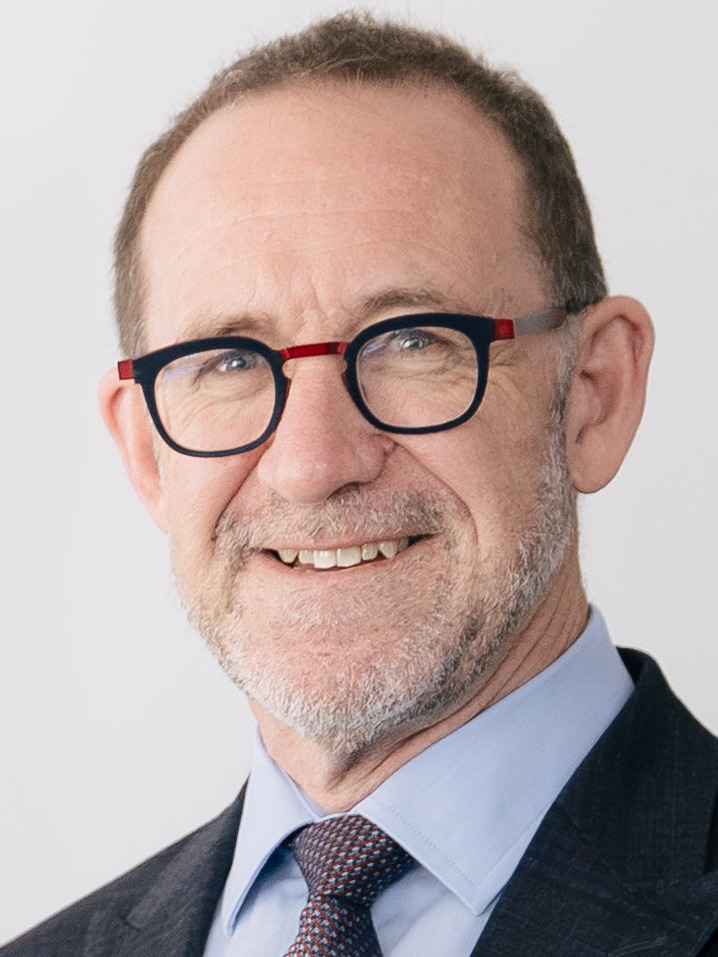

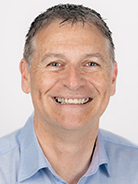

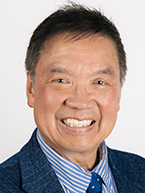

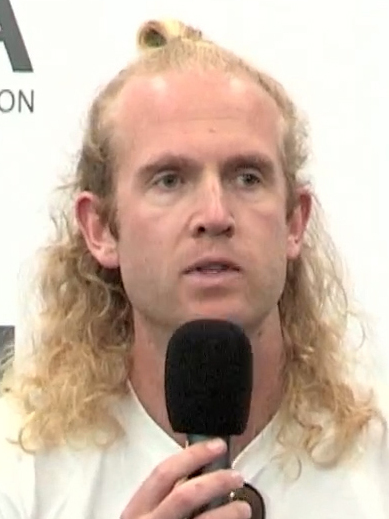

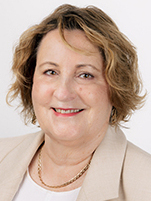
Candidate	Andrew Little	Karl Tiefenbacher	Ray Chung
Party	Labour	Independent	Independent Together
Primary vote	46,016	11,494	8,532
Percentage	56.41%	14.09%	10.46%
Candidate	Alex Baker	Diane Calvert
Party	Independent	Independent
Primary vote	7,506	4,093
Percentage	9.20%	5.02%
Mayor before election
Tory Whanau
Green
Elected mayor
Andrew Little
Labour
- Councillors
- 15 seats on the governing body of Wellington City Council; 8 seats needed for a majority
Party	Seats	+/–
Independent	5	−3
Labour	5	+1
Green	4	+1
Independent Together	1	+1
This lists parties that won seats. See the complete results below.
Control before	Control after
No majority	No majority

=== 2025 Wellington mayoral election ===
2025 Wellington mayoral election
Party	Candidate	Primary votes	%	±%	Iteration	
Party	Candidate	Primary votes	%	±%	#	Votes
Labour	Andrew Little	46,016	56.41	(new)	1st	46,016
Independent	Karl Tiefenbacher	11,494	14.09	(new)	1st	11,494
Independent Together	Ray Chung	8,534	10.46	−3.75	1st	8,534
Independent	Alex Baker	7,506	9.20	(new)	1st	7,506
Independent	Diane Calvert	4,093	5.02	(new)	1st	4,093
Independent	Kelvin Hastie	954	1.17	−1.53	1st	954
Independent	Rob Goulden	893	1.09	(new)	1st	893
Independent	Joan Ahi	459	0.56	(new)	1st	459
Independent	William Pennywize	364	0.45	(new)	1st	364
Independent	Scott Caldwell	295	0.36	(new)	1st	295
Silly Hat	Josh Harford	270	0.33	(new)	1st	270
Independent	Donald McDonald	253	0.31	−0.22	1st	253
Quota		40,566	49.73	+0.44		
Informal votes		120	0.15	+0.01		
Blank votes		323	0.40	−0.26		
Turnout		81,574	50.57	+5.03		
Registered electors		161,318				
Labour gain from Independent Green on 1st iteration						

=== Takapū/Northern general ward ===
2025 Takapū/Northern general ward election
Party	Candidate	Primary votes	%	±%	Iteration	
Party	Candidate	Primary votes	%	±%	#	Votes
Labour	Ben McNulty^{†}	8,601	52.25	+35.39	1st	8,601
Independent	Tony Randle^{†}	2,136	12.98	−2.98	6th	4,173
Independent	Andrew Compton	1,458	8.86	(new)	8th	3,313
Independent	John Apanowicz^{†}	1,143	6.94	−7.21	8th	3,176
ACT Local	Mark Flynn	1,698	10.32	(new)	5th	2,087
Independent	Michael Hill	561	3.41	(new)	4th	981
Independent	Joan Shi	480	2.92	(new)	3rd	794
Quota		4,019	24.42	+0.46		
Informal votes		61	0.37	+0.10		
Blank votes		322	1.96	−1.63		
Turnout		16,460	46.55	+5.60		
Registered electors		35,362				
Labour hold on 1st iteration						
Independent hold on 6th iteration						
Independent gain from Independent on 8th iteration						
^{†} incumbent

=== Wharangi/Onslow-Western general ward ===
2025 Wharangi/Onslow-Western general ward election
Party	Candidate	Primary votes	%	±%	Iteration	
Party	Candidate	Primary votes	%	±%	#	Votes
Independent	Diane Calvert^{†}	5,368	26.92	+6.82	1st	5,368
Green	Rebecca Matthews^{†}	4,437	22.25	+4.96	5th	4,876
Independent Together	Ray Chung^{†}	2,813	14.11	−9.65	9th	4,496
Labour	Joy Gribben	2,992	15.00	(new)	9th	4,452
Independent	Lily Brown	1,331	6.67	(new)	5th	1,947
Independent	Kelvin Hastie	1,207	6.05	−0.92	4th	1,411
ACT Local	Ray Bowden	735	3.69	(new)	3rd	838
Independent Together	Guy Nunns	718	3.60	(new)	2nd	738
Quota		4,900	24.57	+0.32		
Informal votes		51	0.26	−0.04		
Blank votes		289	1.45	−0.79		
Turnout		19,941	58.82	+6.30		
Registered electors		33,904				
Independent hold on 1st iteration						
Green gain from Labour on 5th iteration						
Independent Together gain from Independent on 9th iteration						
^{†} incumbent

=== Pukehīnau/Lambton general ward ===
2025 Pukehīnau/Lambton general ward election
Party	Candidate	Primary votes	%	±%	Iteration	
Party	Candidate	Primary votes	%	±%	#	Votes
Green	Geordie Rogers^{†}	4,445	31.45	(new)	1st	4,445
Labour	Afnan Al-Rubayee	2,701	19.11	+11.69	4th	3,423
Independent	Nicola Young^{†}	2,496	17.66	+1.66	9th	3,711
Independent	Tim Ward	1,247	8.82	(new)	9th	2,215
Independent	Dan Milward	970	6.86	(new)	8th	1,472
Independent	David Lee	588	4.16	(new)	7th	874
Independent	Rodney Barber	490	3.47	(new)	6th	576
Independent Together	Stuart Wong	363	2.57	(new)	5th	387
Independent	Teal Mau	263	1.86	(new)	4th	291
Independent	Tony De Lorenzo	167	1.18	(new)	3rd	178
Independent	Zan Rai Gyaw	39	0.28	−0.27	2nd	39
Quota		3,442	24.35	+0.28		
Informal votes		67	0.47	+0.16		
Blank votes		298	2.11	+0.09		
Turnout		14,134	44.66	+4.29		
Registered electors		31,650				
Green hold on 1st iteration						
Labour gain from Independent on 4th iteration						
Independent hold on 9th iteration						
^{†} incumbent

=== Motukairangi/Eastern general ward ===
2025 Motukairangi/Eastern general ward election
Party	Candidate	Primary votes	%	±%	Iteration	
Party	Candidate	Primary votes	%	±%	#	Votes
Independent	Karl Tiefenbacher	3,467	23.20	(new)	4th	3,665
Labour	Sam O'Brien	2,583	17.29	(new)	9th	3,824
Green	Jonny Osborne	1,972	13.20	(new)	10th	3,422
Independent Together	Ken Ah Kuoi	1,803	12.07	+4.05	10th	2,907
Independent	Alex Baker	1,477	9.89	(new)	8th	1,955
Independent	Chris Calvi-Freeman	947	6.34	(new)	7th	1,251
Independent	Trish Given	998	6.68	(new)	6th	1,070
ACT Local	Luke Kuggeleijn	522	3.49	(new)	4th	572
Independent	Rob Goulden	445	2.98	−1.43	3rd	467
Independent Together	Michelle McGuire	323	2.16	(new)	2nd	324
Independent	Thomas G. P. Morgan	56	0.37	(new)	1st	56
Quota		3,648	24.42	+0.49		
Informal votes		77	0.52	−0.18		
Blank votes		271	1.81	−1.43		
Turnout		14,941	52.38	+4.96		
Registered electors		28,526				
Independent gain from Independent on 4th iteration						
Labour hold on 9th iteration						
Green gain from Independent on 10th iteration						

=== Paekawakawa/Southern general ward ===
2025 Paekawakawa/Southern general ward election
Party	Candidate	Primary votes	%	±%	Iteration	
Party	Candidate	Primary votes	%	±%	#	Votes
Labour	Nureddin Abdurahman^{†}	4,723	35.61	+15.81	1st	4,723
Green	Laurie Foon^{†}	4,687	35.34	−0.06	1st	4,687
Independent Together	Paula Muollo	2,379	17.94	+4.93	1st	2,379
Independent	Kevin Zeng	626	4.72	(new)	1st	626
Independent	Mike Petrie	450	3.39	(new)	1st	450
Independent	Donald McDonald	100	0.75	(new)	1st	100
Quota		4,322	32.58	+0.50		
Informal votes		60	0.45	+0.03		
Blank votes		239	1.80	−0.87		
Turnout		13,264	52.26	+2.31		
Registered electors		25,383				
Labour hold on 1st iteration						
Green hold on 1st iteration						
^{†} incumbent

=== Te Whanganui-a-Tara Māori ward ===
2025 Te Whanganui-a-Tara Māori ward election
Party	Candidate	Primary votes	%	±%	Iteration	
Party	Candidate	Primary votes	%	±%	#	Votes
Labour	Matthew Reweti	1,258	44.39	+8.19	2nd	1,502
Green	Tory Whanau	1,016	35.85	(new)	2nd	1,148
Independent	Te Paea Paringatai	492	17.36	(new)	1st	492
Quota		1,383	48.80	+1.67		
Informal votes		12	0.42	+0.05		
Blank votes		56	1.98	−2.69		
Turnout		2,834	43.65	+11.18		
Registered electors		6,493				
Labour gain from Green on 2nd iteration						

=== Referendum on Māori wards ===
Choice	Votes	%
I vote to KEEP Māori wards	52,677	68.37
I vote to REMOVE Māori wards	24,365	31.63
Total	77,042	100.00
Valid votes	77,042	94.44
Invalid votes	18	0.02
Blank votes	4,514	5.53
Total votes	81,574	100.00
Registered voters/turnout	161,318	50.57
Source: electionz.com & MCERT

== Masterton District Council ==
2025 Masterton District Council election
- 11 October 2025
- Turnout: 9,564 (47.56% ▼0.20 pp)
- Mayor
		Ind
Candidate	Bex Johnson	Stella Lennox
Party	Independent	Independent
Popular vote	2,844	2,614
Percentage	29.74%	27.33%
	Ind	Ind
Candidate	Craig Bowyer	Waireka Collins
Party	Independent	Independent
Popular vote	2,590	1,242
Percentage	27.08%	12.99%
Mayor before election
Gary Caffell
Independent
Elected mayor
Bex Johnson
Independent
- Councillors
- 8 seats on the governing body of Masterton District Council; 5 seats needed for a majority
Party	Seats	+/–
Independent	8	0
This lists parties that won seats. See the complete results below.
Control before	Control after
No majority	No majority

=== 2025 Masterton mayoral election ===
2025 Masterton mayoral election
Party	Candidate	Votes	%	±%
Independent	Bex Jonhson	2,844	29.74	(new)
Independent	Stella Lennox	2,614	27.33	(new)
Independent	Craig Bowyer	2,590	27.08	+13.20
Independent	Waireka Collings	1,242	12.99	(new)
Informal votes		9	0.09	−0.18
Blank votes		265	2.77	+0.56
Turnout		9,564	47.56	−0.20
Registered electors		20,108		
Independent gain from Independent				

=== Masterton at-large ===
2025 Masterton at-large election
Party	Candidate	Votes	%	±%
Independent	Jamie Falloon	5,658	59.16	(new)
Independent	Stella Lennox^{†}	5,397	56.43	+11.96
Independent	David Holmes^{†}	3,491	36.50	−13.51
Independent	Tony Hargood	2,854	29.84	(new)
Independent	Chris Peterson	2,546	26.62	(new)
Independent	Jo Hayes	2,104	22.00	(new)
Independent	Hayden Mischefski	1,867	19.52	(new)
Independent	Drew Hullah	688	7.19	−3.03
Informal votes		78	0.82	+0.44
Blank votes		224	2.34	−0.16
Turnout		9,564	47.56	−0.20
Registered electors		20,108		
Independent gain from Independent				
Independent hold				
Independent hold				
^{†} incumbent

=== Masterton/Whakaoriori general ward ===
2025 Masterton/Whakaoriori general ward election
Party	Candidate	Votes	%	±%
Independent	Tim Nelson^{†}	4,283	48.47	+1.89
Independent	Bex Jonhson^{†} (withdrawn, elected mayor)	4,236	47.93	−14.50
Independent	Craig Bowyer^{†}	3,862	43.70	+12.44
Independent	Gary Caffell	3,473	39.30	(new)
Independent	Brent Goodwin	2,975	33.67	(new)
Independent	Lyn Riley	2,911	32.94	(new)
Independent	Rob Harvey	2,783	31.49	(new)
Independent	AJ - Andrea Jackson	2,411	27.28	(new)
Independent	Henriette Nagel	1,891	21.40	(new)
Independent	Gail Marshall	1,087	12.30	(new)
Informal votes		10	0.11	−0.06
Blank votes		176	1.99	+1.10
Turnout		8,837	48.38	−1.81
Registered electors		18,266		
Independent hold				
Independent hold				
Independent gain from Independent				
Independent gain from Independent				
^{†} incumbent

=== Masterton/Whakaoriori Māori ward ===
2025 Masterton/Whakaoriori Māori ward election
Party	Candidate	Votes	%	±%
Independent	Waireka Collings	529	72.76	(new)
Independent	Marama Tuuta^{†}	180	24.76	n/a
Informal votes		2	0.28	n/a
Blank votes		16	2.20	n/a
Turnout		727	39.47	n/a
Registered electors		1,842		
Independent gain from Independent				
^{†} incumbent

=== Referendum on Māori wards ===
Choice	Votes	%
I vote to KEEP Māori wards	4,810	52.80
I vote to REMOVE Māori wards	4,299	47.20
Total	9,109	100.00
Valid votes	9,109	95.24
Invalid votes	2	0.02
Blank votes	453	4.74
Total votes	9,564	100.00
Registered voters/turnout	20,108	47.56
Source: electionz.com & MCERT

== Carterton District Council ==
2025 Carterton District Council election
- 11 October 2025
- Turnout: 4,159 (53.89% ▼6.78 pp)
- Mayor
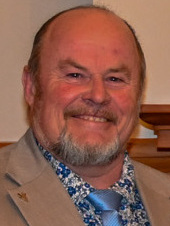
		Ind	Ind
Candidate	Steve Cretney	Brian Deller	Simon Casey
Party	Independent	Independent	Independent
Popular vote	1,733	1,170	1,148
Percentage	41.67%	28.13%	27.60%
Mayor before election
Ron Mark
Independent
Elected mayor
Steve Cretney
Independent
- Councillors
- 8 seats on the governing body of Carterton District Council; 5 seats needed for a majority
Party	Seats	+/–
Independent	8	0
This lists parties that won seats. See the complete results below.
Control before	Control after
No majority	No majority

=== 2025 Carterton mayoral election ===
2025 Carterton mayoral election
Party	Candidate	Votes	%	±%
Independent	Steve Cretney	1,733	41.67	(new)
Independent	Brian Deller	1,170	28.13	(new)
Independent	Simon Casey	1,148	27.60	(new)
Informal votes		4	0.10	+0.10
Blank votes		104	2.50	+1.03
Turnout		4,159	53.89	−6.78
Registered electors		7,718		
Independent gain from Independent				

=== Carterton at-large ===
2025 Carterton District Council election
Party	Candidate	Votes	%	±%
Independent	Lou Newman^{†}	2,762	66.41	+14.51
Independent	Grace Ayling^{†}	2,444	58.76	+14.88
Independent	Steve Cretney^{†} (withdrawn, elected mayor)	2,228	53.57	+0.13
Independent	Jane Burns	2,057	49.46	(new)
Independent	Steve Laurence^{†}	2,039	49.03	−6.31
Independent	Brian Deller^{†}	2,025	48.69	+3.06
Independent	Steve Gallon^{†}	1,971	47.39	−4.75
Independent	Simon Casey	1,761	42.34	(new)
Independent	Rachel Round	1,761	42.34	(new)
Independent	Peter Veltkamp	1,383	33.25	(new)
Independent	Haley Malcolm	1,244	29.91	(new)
Independent	Ben Laybourn	1,208	29.05	(new)
Independent	John Futter	992	23.85	(new)
Independent	Dale Scott	974	23.42	(new)
Independent	Joshua Groot	877	21.09	(new)
Independent	Stephen Foothead	834	20.05	(new)
Independent	Philip Holland	607	14.59	(new)
Independent	Simon Peacock	538	12.94	(new)
Informal votes		9	0.22	+0.09
Blank votes		26	0.63	−1.86
Turnout		4,159	53.89	−6.78
Registered electors		7,718		
Independent hold				
Independent hold				
Independent gain from Independent				
Independent hold				
Independent hold				
Independent hold				
Independent gain from Independent				
Independent gain from Independent				
^{†} incumbent

== South Wairarapa District Council ==
2025 South Wairarapa District Council election
- 11 October 2025
- Turnout: 5,597 (59.89% ▲4.43 pp)
- Mayor
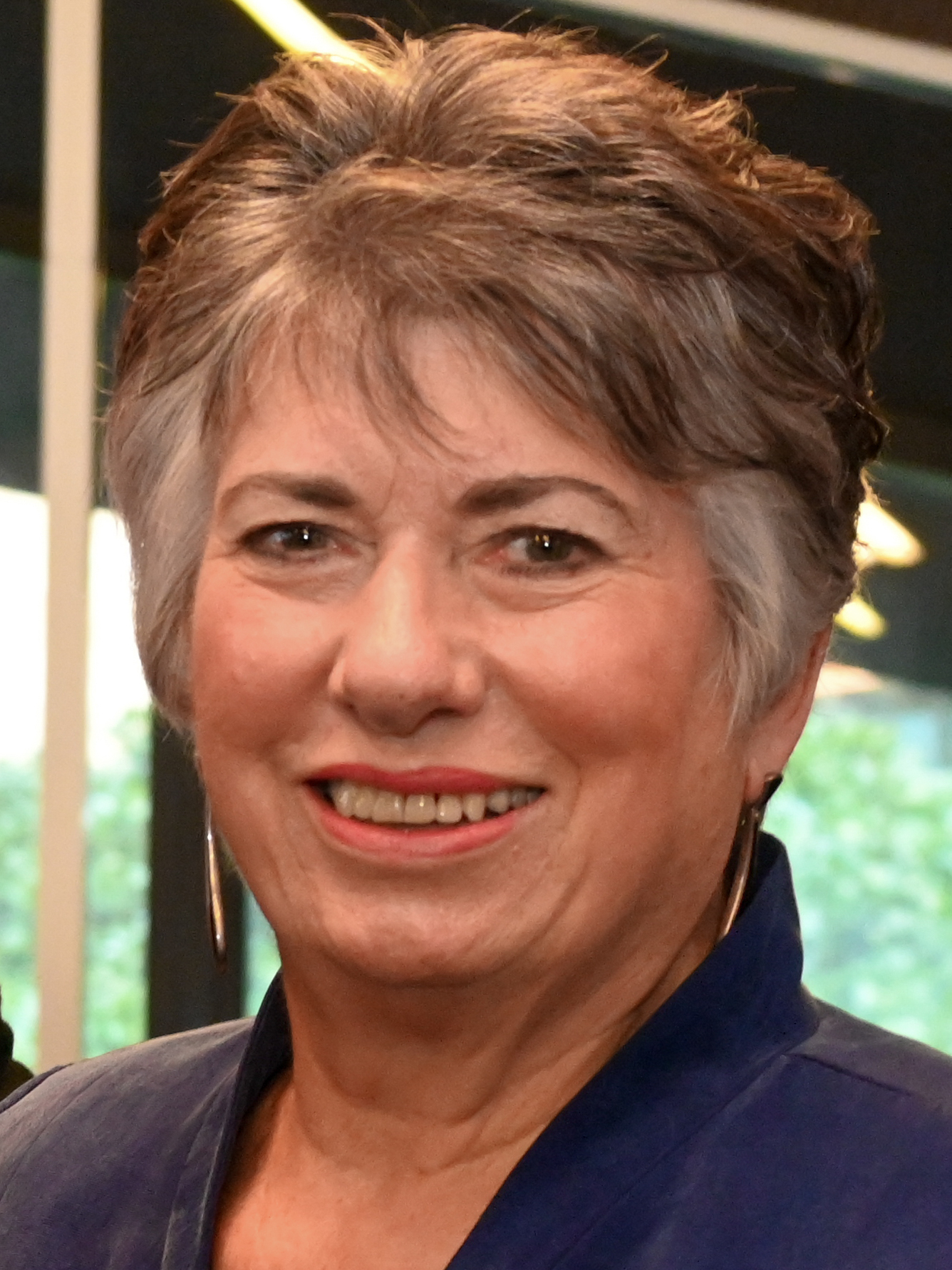
		Ind
Candidate	Fran Wilde	Leah Hawkins
Party	Independent	Independent
Popular vote	3,381	2,150
Percentage	60.41%	38.42%
Mayor before election
Martin Connelly
Independent
Elected mayor
Fran Wilde
Independent
- Councillors
- 10 seats on the governing body of South Wairarapa District Council; 6 seats needed for a majority
Party	Seats	+/–
Independent	10	+1
This lists parties that won seats. See the complete results below.
Control before	Control after
No majority	No majority

=== 2025 South Wairarapa mayoral election ===
2025 South Wairarapa mayoral election
Party	Candidate	Votes	%	±%
Independent	Fran Wilde	3,381	60.41	(new)
Independent	Leah Hawkins	2,150	38.41	(new)
Informal votes		2	0.04	−0.06
Blank votes		63	1.13	−0.35
Turnout		5,597	59.89	+4.43
Registered electors		9,346		
Independent gain from Independent				

=== Greytown general ward ===
2025 Greytown general ward election
Party	Candidate	Votes	%	±%
Independent	Collier Isaacs	1,504	73.44	(new)
Independent	Simone Baker	1,320	64.45	(new)
Independent	Martin 'Boz' Bosley^{†}	1,274	62.21	−2.42
Independent	Michelle Dawson	904	44.14	(new)
Informal votes		2	0.10	−0.07
Blank votes		60	2.93	+1.49
Turnout		2,048	62.06	+5.47
Registered electors		3,300		
Independent gain from Independent				
Independent gain from Independent				
Independent hold				
^{†} incumbent

=== Featherston general ward ===
2025 Featherston general ward election
Party	Candidate	Votes	%	±%
Independent	Rachel Clarke	869	63.85	(new)
Independent	Rupert Watson	846	62.16	(new)
Independent	Colin Olds^{†}	739	54.30	+7.66
Independent	Karen Coltman	575	42.25	(new)
Independent	Martin Geoffrey Davis	341	25.06	(new)
Informal votes		4	0.29	−0.21
Blank votes		23	1.69	+0.77
Turnout		1,361	54.07	+1.09
Registered electors		2,517		
Independent gain from Independent				
Independent gain from Independent				
Independent hold				
^{†} incumbent

=== Martinborough general ward ===
2025 Martinborough general ward election
Party	Candidate	Votes	%	±%
Independent	Rob Taylor	1,453	72.29	(new)
Independent	Aidan Ellims^{†}	1,159	57.66	−9.47
Independent	Chris Archer	1,077	53.58	(new)
Independent	Pip Maynard^{†}	984	48.96	−19.74
Independent	Storm Robertson	546	27.16	(new)
Informal votes		5	0.25	+0.08
Blank votes		26	1.29	+0.34
Turnout		2,010	65.49	+9.07
Registered electors		3,069		
Independent gain from Independent				
Independent hold				
Independent gain from Independent				
^{†} incumbent

=== Te Karu o Te Ika a Māui Māori ward ===
2025 Te Karu o Te Ika a Māui Māori ward election
Party	Candidate	Votes	%	±%
Independent	Andrea Rutene	119	57.21	n/a
Independent	Whitu Karauna	75	36.06	n/a
Informal votes		0	0.00	n/a
Blank votes		14	6.73	n/a
Turnout		208	45.22	n/a
Registered electors		460		
Independent win (new seat)				

=== Referendum on Māori wards ===
Choice	Votes	%
I vote to KEEP Māori wards	2,911	55.96
I vote to REMOVE Māori wards	2,291	44.04
Total	5,202	100.00
Valid votes	5,202	92.96
Invalid votes	0	0.00
Blank votes	394	7.04
Total votes	5,596	100.00
Registered voters/turnout	9,346	59.88
Source: electionz.com & MCERT

== See also ==
- 2025 Greater Wellington Regional Council election
