= 2025 Wellington mayoral election =

New Zealand local election

- 11 October 2025
- Turnout: 81,574 (50.57% ▲5.03 pp)
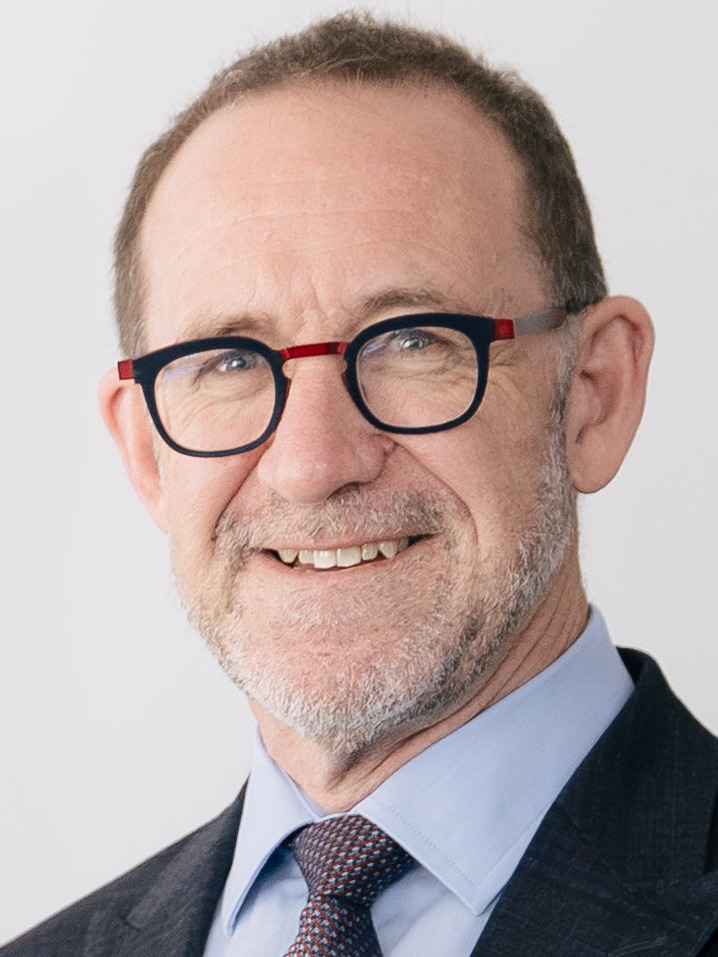

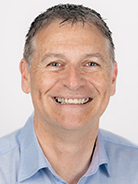

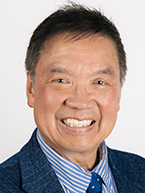

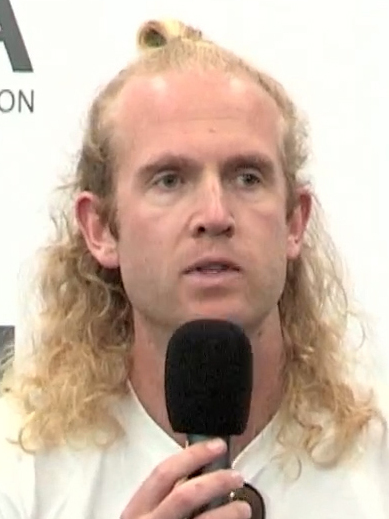

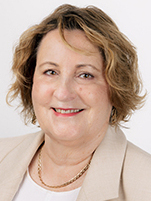
Candidate	Andrew Little	Karl Tiefenbacher	Ray Chung
Party	Labour	Independent	Independent Together
Primary vote	46,016	11,494	8,532
Percentage	56.41%	14.09%	10.46%
Candidate	Alex Baker	Diane Calvert
Party	Independent	Independent
Primary vote	7,506	4,093
Percentage	9.20%	5.02%
Mayor before election
Tory Whanau
Green
Elected mayor
Andrew Little
Labour

The 2025 Wellington mayoral election was a local election held from 9 September to 11 October in Wellington, New Zealand, as part of that year's city council election and nation-wide local elections. Voters elected the mayor of Wellington for the 2025–2028 term of the Wellington City Council. Postal voting and the single transferable vote system were used.

The incumbent mayor Tory Whanau did not run for a second term as mayor, instead running for council in the Te Whanganui-a-Tara Māori ward.

Former Labour leader Andrew Little won the mayoralty in a landslide.

== Key dates ==
The timeline of electoral events were:

- Friday 4 July – Candidate nominations open, roll opens for public inspection
- Friday 1 August – Nominations close at midday, electoral roll closes
- Tuesday 9 September – Ballots posted out, voting opens
- Saturday 11 October – Voting closes at midday
- Saturday 11 October – Preliminary results released
- Thursday 16 to Sunday 19 October – Final results declared

== Campaign ==
Incumbent mayor Tory Whanau had announced she would run for a second term, but later changed her mind after Andrew Little entered the race. Ray Chung would contest the election as the candidate from the Independent Together group.

Other candidates looking to contest the mayoralty include business owner Karl Tiefenbacher, former Wellington LIVE media owner Graham Bloxham, conservationist Kelvin Hastie, former city councillor Rob Goulden, and former chartered accountant Alex Baker.

A campaign parodying Independent Together was launched in June 2025, featuring "Pennywize the Rewilding Clown" for mayor, with a campaign website that closely parodied that of the Independent Together website. The parody played on the character from Stephen King's horror franchise It.

In late July, Bloxham announced that he was withdrawing from the race citing personal attacks.

=== Fundraising ===
In December 2025, The New Zealand Herald reported that Little had spent NZ$58,990.26 on his mayoral campaign, with the funds mainly going into signs, Facebook advertising and flyers. In terms of donations, Little received NZ$2,000 from former National Party MP Chris Finlayson, $2,500 from former Labour MP and diplomat Annette King and her husband, $5,000 from multimillionaire developer Ian Cassels of the Wellington Company, and $2,500 from former city councillor and art patron Chris Parkin. The Maritime Union of New Zealand, Amalgamated Workers Union, E tū, and Dairy Workers Union each donated $5,000 to Little's campaign. In addition, former Wellington Mayor Justin Lester and the Labour Party raised $2,075 and $1,634.15 for Little through fundraising dinners.

Ray Chung received between NZ$150,000 and 200,000 in donations through his electoral ticket Independent Together. These donations included NZ$10,000 from heritage advocate Felicity Wong, NZ$5,000 from investment management company The Thorndon Group, $27,542.17 from Independent Together's parent organisation Better Wellington, and $20,000 from philanthropist Mark Dunajtschik (who subsequently rescinded his support for Chung following media coverage about his remarks of incumbent mayor Tory Whanau). Wellington councillor and mayoral candidate Karl Tiefenbacher received $50,617 worth in campaign donations while fellow councillor Diane Calvert spent $16,000 on her campaign.

== List of candidates ==
=== Declared ===
Candidate	Photo	Affiliation (Note: A candidate could leave their affiliation blank, run as an independent, or run with an affiliation to an organisation, local body ticket, political party, whānau, hapū, or iwi.)	Notes
Alex Baker		Independent	Former chartered accountant, also ran for councillor in the Motukairangi/Eastern ward
Scott 'Scoot' Caldwell		The Scoot Foundation	Aucklander who visited Wellington for the first time in June 2025. Affordable housing and transport advocate.
Diane Calvert		Not Affiliated	Incumbent councillor for the Wharangi/Onslow-Western ward since 2016. Also ran for re-election as a councillor for the Wharangi/Onslow-Western ward.
Ray Chung		Independent Together	City councillor since 2022, and mayoral candidate in the 2022 election
Rob Goulden		My Vision for the City 2050	Former city councillor (1998–2010). Also ran to be a councillor in the Motukairangi/Eastern general ward.
Josh Harford		Aotearoa New Zealand Silly Hat Party	Deputy leader (Consort), Silly Hat Party. Satirical candidate.
Kelvin Hastie		Independent	Conservationist and mayoral candidate in the 2022 election. Also ran to be a councillor for the Wharangi/Onslow-Western general ward.
Andrew Little		Labour	Former Labour leader and cabinet minister
Donald McDonald		Mcdone waiting 2coming terms Passover	Previously ran for mayor in 2019 and 2022. Also ran for councillor in the Paekawakawa/Southern general ward.
William Pennywize		Pennywize the Rewilding Clown	Satirical candidate.
Joan Shi		Independent	Previously ran in the 2024 Pukehīnau/Lambton general ward by-election. Also ran to be a councillor in the Takapū/Northern general ward.
Karl Tiefenbacher		Independent	Businessman and founder of icecream brand Kaffee Eis. Previously ran in the 2024 Pukehīnau/Lambton general ward by-election. Also ran to be a councillor in the Motukairangi/Eastern ward.

=== Speculated ===
- John Apanowicz, councillor for the Northern ward since 2022
- Justin Lester, former mayor (2016–19)

=== Declined ===
- Jill Day, President of the Labour Party and former deputy mayor
- Fleur Fitzsimons, unionist and former Wellington City Councillor for Southern Ward
- Thomas Nash, regional councillor since 2019 (endorsed Whanau)
- David Parker, former Labour Party deputy leader and cabinet minister
- Luke Pierson, founding member of the Vision for Wellington lobby group
- Nicola Young, councillor for the Lambton ward since 2013 (endorsed Little)

=== Withdrawn ===
- Tory Whanau, mayor since 2022 (endorsed Little)
- Graham Bloxham, owner of Wellington Live Facebook page

== Opinion polling ==
Date	Polling organisation	Sample size	Alex Baker	Diane Calvert	Ray Chung	Kelvin Hastie	Andrew Little	Karl Tiefenbacher	Tory Whanau	Other
4–6 September 2025	1 News–Verian	403	3	6	16	0	58	10	—	9 (Note: Rob Goulden on 4%, Josh Harford on 3%, Scott Caldwell and William Pennywize on 1%, Joan Shi and Donald McDonald on 0%)
22–28 August 2025	Curia (Note: Commissioned by Common Ground Aotearoa, a lobby group in favour of land value tax.)	750	5.9	15.6	18.9	1.5	44.6	9.3	—	—
January 2025	Curia (Note: Commissioned by Better Wellington, a right-wing group which endorsed Ray Chung for mayor.)	1,000	—	—	56	11	—	—	33	—

== Results ==
Former Labour leader Andrew Little won the mayoralty in a landslide. Businessman Karl Tiefenbacher came in second, with councillor Ray Chung in third place.

2025 Wellington mayoral election
Party	Candidate	Primary votes	%	±%	Iteration	
Party	Candidate	Primary votes	%	±%	#	Votes
Labour	Andrew Little	46,016	56.41	(new)	1st	46,016
Independent	Karl Tiefenbacher	11,494	14.09	(new)	1st	11,494
Independent Together	Ray Chung	8,534	10.46	−3.75	1st	8,534
Independent	Alex Baker	7,506	9.20	(new)	1st	7,506
Independent	Diane Calvert	4,093	5.02	(new)	1st	4,093
Independent	Kelvin Hastie	954	1.17	−1.53	1st	954
Independent	Rob Goulden	893	1.09	(new)	1st	893
Independent	Joan Ahi	459	0.56	(new)	1st	459
Independent	William Pennywize	364	0.45	(new)	1st	364
Independent	Scott Caldwell	295	0.36	(new)	1st	295
Silly Hat	Josh Harford	270	0.33	(new)	1st	270
Independent	Donald McDonald	253	0.31	−0.22	1st	253
Quota		40,566	49.73	+0.44		
Informal votes		120	0.15	+0.01		
Blank votes		323	0.40	−0.26		
Turnout		81,574	50.57	+5.03		
Registered electors		161,318				
Labour gain from Independent Green on 1st iteration						
