= Mike the Juggler =

New Zealand juggler (1955–2023)

Michael Eric Wahrlich
- Born: 27 June 1955; Wellington, New Zealand
- Died: 16 May 2023 (aged 67); Newtown, Wellington
- Cause of death: Homicide (Loafers Lodge fire)
- Other name: Mike the Juggler
- Occupation: Juggler

Michael Eric Wahrlich (1955–2023), better known as Mike the Juggler, was a New Zealand busker who juggled tennis balls in the streets of Te Aro, Wellington, for about three decades. He was killed in the Loafers Lodge fire, which occurred in the hostel he lived in. A man was subsequently charged with arson and murder.

== Early life ==
Wahrlich was born in Wellington Hospital on 27 June 1955 and grew up in Porirua. He had four siblings: an older brother and three younger sisters. He learned to juggle as a child with oranges and lemons from the kitchen.

For some time Wahrlich attended Epuni Boys' Home in Lower Hutt near the start of its history, when it was run by the Ministry of Education.

== Career ==
After moving to Wellington, Wahrlich became a lawnmower for the Wellington City Council in the 1980s, and was later made redundant.

In the late 90s, Wahrlich met a man playing the guitar in Manners Mall, and after seeing him succeed, Wahrlich decided that he would also entertain the public in Manners Mall, by juggling tennis balls. He would often do this wearing a tracksuit, or what RNZ described as a "Signature blue jumper and baggy pants". When Manners Mall was closed he started juggling on Lambton Quay outside a Westpac bank, and also in Cuba Street.

Wahrlich was hospitalised in 2022 after being badly assaulted at his hostel, and was discharged from hospital about a month later. As a result of the assault, a 39-year-old was arrested and charged with intent to do bodily harm, and was remanded in custody.

In 2022 Wellington City councillor Nicola Young described him as a "city institution", and another councillor, Laurie Foon, said "Mike has been on the streets of Wellington since most of us Wellingtonians can remember".

== Death ==
Mike the Juggler memorial plaque in Lambton Quay

Wahrlich died on 16 May 2023, aged 67, in the Loafers Lodge fire in his hostel, which also caused the deaths of four others. After his death was confirmed, flowers and three oranges representing juggling balls were placed on his usual juggling spot, outside the Westpac bank in Lambton Quay. Over 200 people subsequently wrote messages for him on an online tribute book. His funeral was open to the public and was held on 26 May. It was attended by 120 people in person and 300 people online, including Wellington Mayor Tory Whanau and Councillor Nureddin Abdurahman.

In May 2024 a permanent memorial plaque was unveiled for his juggling spot at Lambton Quay.
