= Loafers Lodge fire =

2023 fire in Loafers Lodge in Wellington, New Zealand

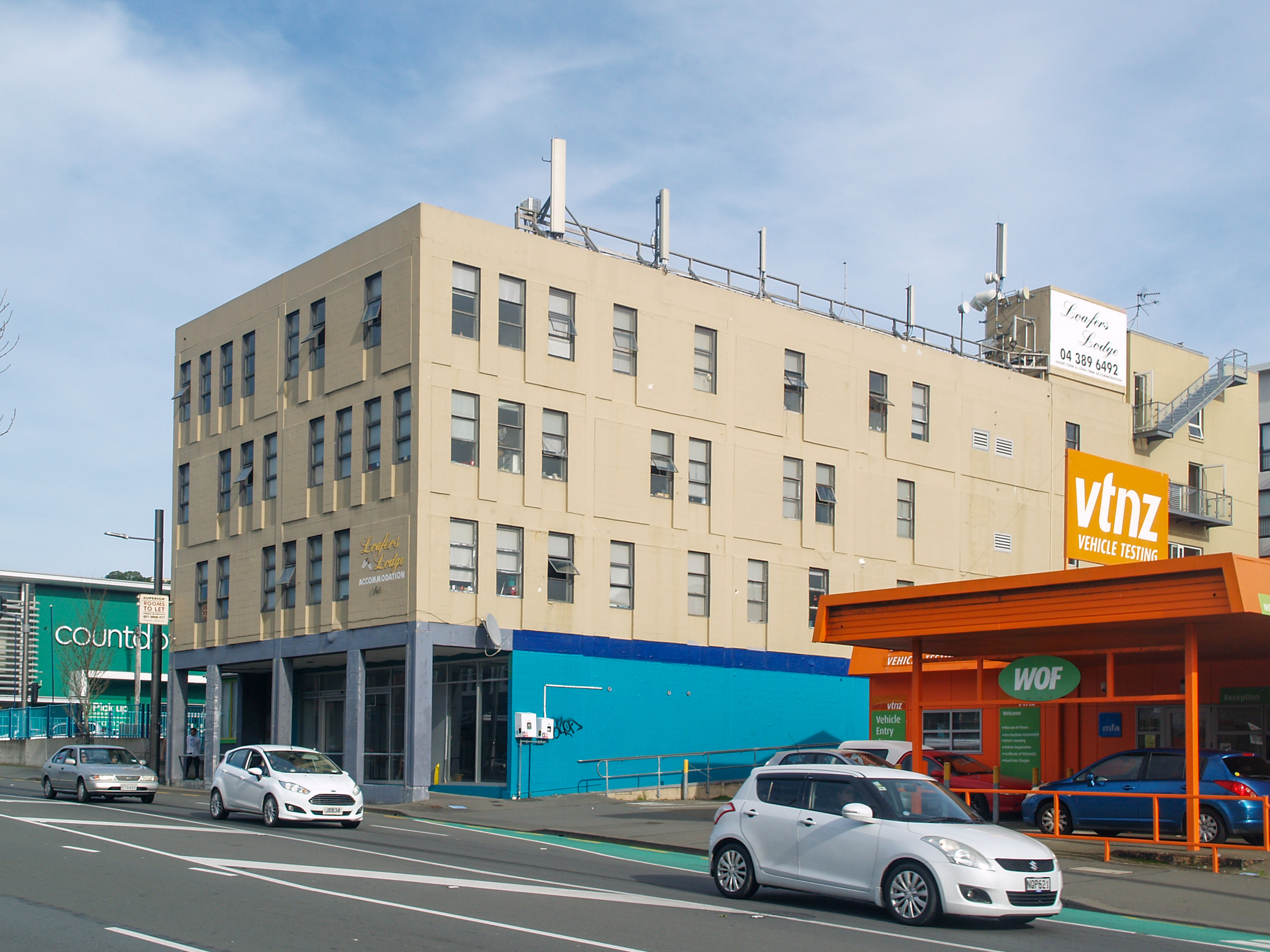
- Loafers Lodge in August 2021
- Date: 16 May 2023
- Venue: Loafers Lodge
- Location: Newtown, Wellington, New Zealand; 41.3067°S 174.7777°E
- Type: Fire
- Cause: Arson
- Perpetrator: Esarona David Lologa
- Deaths: 5
- Injuries: 20
- Property damage: Fire damage, partial collapse of building
- Arrests: 1

On 16 May 2023, a fire broke out at the 92-bed Loafers Lodge in Newtown, Wellington, New Zealand. Five people were killed, and twenty others injured. On 18 May 2023, a suspect, later identified as Esarona David Lologa, was arrested. He was charged and later found guilty of arson and murder following a four-week trial in late September 2025. In mid-December 2025, Lologa was sentenced to life imprisonment with a minimum term of 22 years for his role in the Loafers Lodge fire.

== Background ==
=== Loafers Lodge ===
The four-storey building was constructed in 1971 as an office and warehouse building called Mertex House. Since 2006, the building has been occupied by Loafers Lodge.

The building previously served as a place of emergency residential housing contracted by the New Zealand Government. A deportee advocate said the hostel was used by Prison Aid and Rehabilitation, and by the government to house deportees returned from Australia.

The building's Warrant of Fitness (BWoF) was renewed in March 2023. BWoF records show the building had a "type 3" fire alarm system (automatic system with heat detectors and manual call points) supplemented by smoke detectors. Fire sprinklers were not installed in the building, nor were they required to be installed by the building code. A fire engineer was quoted as saying the rules were "too slack and need tightening".

=== Esarona Lologa ===
Esarona David Lologa grew up in Wellington but moved to Samoa with his family as a child. Lologa experienced an abusive childhood and was beaten by his strict relatives. He later told a psychiatrist that developed an interest in lighting fires while disposing of his family's rubbish as a child. He subsequently returned to New Zealand and attended Naenae College in Lower Hutt until the age of 17 years. Lologa also completed several courses at the Adult Reading and Learning Assistance Federation (ARLA) in Wellington.

At the age of 24 years, Lologa was diagnosed with paranoid schizophrenia after he assaulted a friend around 1999. According to his diagnosis, Lologa remained symptomatic for schizophrenia even when fully medicated. Throughout his adult life, Lologa was involved in several incidents of property damage and assault linked to his mental health condition. Prior to the Loafers Lodge fire, Lologa had 50 previous convictions including serious violent offending. In October 2009, a drunken 35-year old Lologa had assaulted the 19 year old son of his partner with a machete, inflicting serious injuries on the victim's hand and skull. In November 2010, he was sentenced to six years imprisonment with a minimum non-parole period of three and a half years for that offending. Lologa was also previously convicted of an attempted arson at a hotel, which had occurred after he had been kicked out of the facility.

Between 2003 and March 2023, Lologa had been admitted to psychiatric wards eight times following psychotic breakdowns, which were each caused by him not taking his antipsychotic medication. During these episodes, Lologa committed several assaults and public disturbances. Lologa was also incarcerated between November 2010 and July 2016 before being released into community care between July 2016 and July 2022. Though Lologa had been admitted to a mental health facility in Auckland on 22 March 2023, he absconded while on unescorted leave on 21 April, alleging that staff were contaminating his food.

On 4 May 2023, Lologa arrived in Wellington and went to the Ministry of Social Development (MSD) in order to obtain emergency accommodation. The MSD case officer Mary Lualua declined his application since their records showed that he resided in Auckland, he had not sought alternative accommodation in Auckland, and that he had arrived in Wellington with no plans to stay. After MSD failed to find him suitable alternative accommodation, Lologa stayed at a backpackers before moving into Loafers Lodge on 8 May 2023. Police in Auckland received a missing person's report relating to Lologa on 21 April, which was filed on 12 May following contact with Health New Zealand.

== Incident ==
A fire broke out on the top floor of the 92-room lodge around 12:25 am (NZST) on 16 May 2023. Earlier in the night, a couch fire occurred about two hours before the later fire; it was not reported to authorities. It was initially unclear how many people were in the hostel when the fire occurred, however, 52 people were evacuated from the building and at least five were rescued from the roof by Fire and Emergency. Five people died, 20 were injured, and many of the 99 people known to be living at the hostel were made homeless.

A long-term resident of the hostel said that he had noticed the fire while heading back to his room from the bathroom, and that the smoke, crowds and darkness were disorienting before he was able to escape via a stairwell. Other residents said that, due to multiple false fire alarms throughout the past months, there were delays in responding and evacuating.

== Victims ==
The five deceased victims were identified as: Kenneth Barnard, 67; Liam James Hockings, 50, brother of Lucy Hockings; Peter Glenn O'Sullivan, 64; Melvin Joseph Parun, 68; and Mike Eric Wahrlich (known as Mike the Juggler), 67. It was reported that Parun was the brother of tennis player Onny Parun.

== Murder investigation and trial ==
=== Homicide inquiry and arraignment ===
On 17 May 2023, police announced they were treating the fire as arson and had launched a homicide inquiry. At the time, police would not say whether accelerants were used on the fire or why they believe it was deliberately lit.

On 18 May 2023, a 48-year-old man was arrested and charged with two counts of arson. He was arraigned in the Wellington District Court on 19 May 2023, where he entered no plea and was remanded in custody until 19 June 2023. The man's name was suppressed until his next appearance. On 1 June, he was charged with five counts of murder.

On 23 June, Judge Christine Grice of the Wellington High Court granted the murder suspect name suppression until mid-August 2023. The suspect's trial was scheduled to take place in August 2024.

On 21 March 2024, the suspect's lawyer Louise Sziranyi confirmed that the defendant would plead not guilty to the murder charges on the grounds of insanity.

=== Opening arguments ===
On 25 August 2025 the 50-year old defendant, who received interim name suppression, faced trial at the Wellington High Court on five charges of murder and two charges of arson. Justice Peter Churchman presided over the trial, which heard evidence from a 100 witnesses over a period of five weeks. Crown prosecutor Stephanie Bishop told the court that CCTV footage proved that the defendant started two fires, which led to the building's destruction and the death of the five victims. Bishop suggested that the defendant lit the fires since he did not want to live at Loafer Lodge. She told the jury that the law could consider a killing a murder even if the defendant did not intend to kill someone. The defendant's lawyer Louise Sziranyi said the defendant would be mounting an insanity defence during the trial.

=== Trial evidence ===
On 3 September, Crown prosecutor Stephanie Bishop outlined the defendant's clinical history; the man had been in and out of both hospital and community care for the past 25 years. Both the Crown and defence agreed that the defendant suffered from paranoid schizophrenia but dispute whether he was insane when he committed the offending. Prior to moving to Wellington, the defendant had been admitted to an Auckland hospital between 22 March and 21 April 2023. The defendant had left the hospital after claiming that hospital staff were contaminating his food. Both the Crown and defence also accepted that the defendant had been convicted of 50 offences including an attempted arson in 1996 and a "serious violent offence" in 2009.

Throughout the trial, the court heard expert evidence from five psychiatrists: Dr Justin Barry-Walsh, Dr Krishna Pillai, Dr Jeremy Skipworth, Dr Oliver Hansby, and Professor Graham Mellsop. With the exception of Pillai, the majority of these psychiatrists' findings supported the Crown's argument that the defendant's actions did not meet the insanity defence since he knew that lighting the fire was morally wrong.

=== Closing arguments ===
On 22 September, the court heard closing arguments from Crown prosecutor Grant Burston, who argued that the defendant knew that lighting the fire was wrong and that he did so because he did not like living at Loafers Lodge. Burston argued that the defence witness psychiatrist Dr Pillai's evidence was flawed and lacked crucial information. While the Crown accepted that the defendant had schizophrenia and knew what he was doing, they asserted that he knew his actions were morally wrong.

On 23 September, the court heard closing arguments from defence lawyer Louise Sziranyi, who disputed the Crown's evidence that the defendant lit the fire at Loafers Lodge because he did not want to live at the place. She argued that the man was mentally unwell at the time of his offending, citing several "breakthrough symptoms" including the defendant hiding a knife in his shirt, raising a middle finger at a CCTV camera, frequent pacing and outbursts. In terms of the expert evidence, Sziranyi argued that the defendant's inconsistent accounts and lies during interviews showed that he was "disconnected from reality, delusional, unwell." The jury began deliberating on the Crown and defence's arguments and evidence on 24 September. They also watched a video of the defendant's police interview.

=== Verdict ===
Following a five-week trial involving 100 witnesses, the jury convicted the defendant of one count of arson and five counts of murder on 26 September 2025. In addition, Justice Churchman lifted name suppression for the defendant, who was identified as Esarona David Lologa. Several survivors and relatives of the victims attended the verdict. Lologa was remanded for sentencing.

=== Sentencing ===
On 19 December 2025, Lologa was sentenced by Justice Churchman to life imprisonment with a minimum term of 22 years, deducting three years from a possible sentence of 25 years due to his psychiatric condition. During the sentencing hearing, the court heard several victim impact statements from the relatives of the victims and survivors of the Loafers Lodge fire. Churchman described Lologa's actions as "calculated and deliberate, with a degree of planning and a callous indifference."

== Manslaughter investigation and proceedings ==
Following a two-year investigation, Police charged three individuals with manslaughter in relation to the management and operation of Loafers Lodge in early June 2025. The accused are two men aged 75 and 58, and a woman aged 70. Police have alleged they were responsible for the building's fire safety. On 9 June, a 72 year old man was charged with manslaughter in the Wellington District Court. On 27 June, the female defendant was identified as Marie Louise Murphy, who was the building's property manager. She and her three co-defendants pleaded not guilty to charges of manslaughter at the Wellington High Court.

On 5 October, court proceedings against the four defendants–Loafer's Lodge property manager Marie Louise Murphy, director Gregory Bruce Mein, and residents Barry Charles Collins and Glenn Brendan McAllister–began at the Wellington High Court. The four defendants were charged with five charges of gross negligence causing death and five alternate charges of causing manslaughter by breaching health and safety. In the Crown's opening argument, prosecutor Stephanie Bishop argued that Mein and Murphy had failed in their duties to ensure that the building's fire safety system worked. She said that Collins had silenced the fire alarm without investigating its cause. Bishop argued that McAllister, who also served as the building's fire warden, had failed to reset the fire alarm system, allowing the second fire to spread. The jury consisted of five men and seven women. The trial is expected to last for eight weeks.

On 6 October, the court heard opening arguments from the defendants' lawyers, who argued that convicted murderer Lologa was responsible for the deadly fire. A defence lawyer acknowledged that Loafer Lodge's fire safety standards were not functioning well but disputed the Crown's argument that the four co-defendants were responsible for the tragedy. Mein's lawyer Christopher Stevenson KC disputed the Crown's contention that his client took an "arm's length" approaching to managing the building, saying that Mein's directorship was part-time, unpaid, temporary and done as a favour to his friend Chris Stevenson, who owned Loafer's Lodge. Stevenson argued that Mein was not responsible for the building's poor condition and safety standards, which he blamed on regulatory agencies and the owner. Murphy's lawyer Stephen Winter argued that the residents had failed to comply with her fire safety measures. McAllister's lawyer Alex Dye argued that his client was unaware of his duties as a fire warden and had never been paid for them; and claimed that the Crown had invented a job that never existed. Dye argued that McAllister was a victim of Lologa. Collin's lawyer Val Nisbet said that her client had turned off the fire alarm due to a lengthy history of false alarms triggered by residents smoking within the premises.

== Reactions ==
Prime Minister Chris Hipkins called the fire an absolute tragedy. He said that the government will investigate whether regulations for high density accommodation are fit for purpose.

Wellington Central MP Grant Robertson said the fire was absolutely devastating. Wellington mayor Tory Whanau called the fire "one of the darkest days in the city". On the first anniversary of the fire, a permanent memorial plaque was unveiled for Mike the Juggler, who died in the fire. The plaque is located at the spot where he juggled in Lambton Quay.

== Aftermath ==
By 7 June, the Wellington City Mission had raised NZ$360,000 for residents who had lost possessions during the fire. However, only NZ$92,000 of this amount had been given out to displaced residents who received an initial payment of NZ$500, followed by a further payment of NZ$1,000.

On 15 June, hundreds of people attended a remembrance ceremony at Wellington's Cathedral of St Paul for the victims.

On 23 June, lawyers representing displaced residents filed an interim injunction to stop the owners from demolishing the structure in order to retrieve their belongings. Residents had previously been told that the building would be demolished and their possessions would be dumped due to the risk of toxic contamination. Under the injunction, residents will be allowed to conduct their own inspection to determine if their belongings could be retrieved. The owner would also have to take action to prevent further damage to the residents' belongings and would have to provide daily updates.

By late March 2024, Community Law senior lawyer Oscar Upperton confirmed that recovery professionals had managed to return several salvageable possessions including family photos and memorabilia to displaced tenants. Due to water, fire damage and asbestos contamination, some items were irrecoverable. Upperton also confirmed that the tenants and landlord were working on minor issues related to the recovery process that was expected to be settled soon.
