= Ray Chung =

City councillor in Wellington, New Zealand

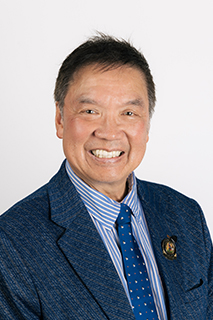
- Official portrait, 2025

Wellington city councillor for the Wharangi/Onslow-Western general ward
- Incumbent
- Assumed office 15 October 2022 Serving with Diane Calvert (2022–present), Rebecca Matthews (2022–present)

Personal details
- Born: 1949 or 1950 (age 76–77)
- Party: Independent Together

Rayward Chung is a New Zealand politician. He was elected to the Wellington City Council as a councillor for the Wharangi/Onslow-Western general ward at the 2022 election and again in the 2025 election, having also stood unsuccessfully for mayor both years.

== Early life and career ==
Ray Chung grew up in Wellington's Te Aro suburb in a Chinese New Zealander family of nine children. His maternal grandfather migrated from Zengcheng, China in 1895, followed by his wife (Chung's grandmother) in 1915, and settled down in Wellington. His mother was born in Wellington in 1917, while his father migrated from China in 1920 at the age of 17. They owned a herbalist business near their home on Jessie Street.

Chung worked for Telecom New Zealand, building and maintaining telephone exchanges. He later studied business at Massey University, graduating with a Bachelor's degree in commerce and later a diploma in international business. After graduating, Chung worked as an engineer and a salesman. Chung later worked for several international telecommunications and technology companies including Siemens, Hansaluftbild, Trimble Inc., the Andrew Corporation, Graseby Goring-Kerr, and Ericsson. Chung also lived in the United States, Sweden, Germany and the United Kingdom. He credited his time in Münster with inspiring his interest in local government politics and civics.

== Local government ==
Chung ran as a councillor for the Wellington City Council during the 2016 and 2019 local body elections. He co-founded the Onslow Residents and Community Association (ORCA) in 2017, serving as vice-president for at least two terms. ORCA lobbied for the Greater Wellington Regional Council to install more lamp posts and bus stops in the suburbs of Broadmeadows, Khandallah and Kaiwharawhara.

During the 2019 Wellington City Council election, Chung campaigned on reducing rates and council spending, opposed housing intensification, and advocated greater Council transparency in dealings with private interests.

=== First term, 2022–2025 ===
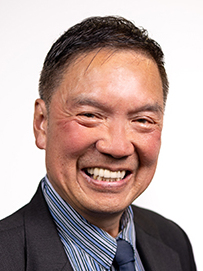
Official portrait, 2022

During the 2022 Wellington City Council election, Chung was elected as the councillor for the Wharangi/Onslow-Western general ward. He also ran for the position of Mayor of Wellington, coming fourth place with 12,670 votes.

In December 2024, Chung and fellow councillors Tony Randle and Nicola Young voted against the Wellington City Council's motion opposing the ACT party's Treaty Principles Bill. Chung filed a code of conduct complaint against Cr Teri O'Neill after she accused them of espousing anti-Māori racism in their objections to the motion.

=== 2025 election campaign ===
In mid April 2024, Chung co-founded a centre-right electoral ticket called Independent Together, which campaigned on a platform of zero rates increases, cutting council expenditure and reinstating lost car parks. Chung stood as both a councillor and mayoral candidate. Chung has also opposed the Wellington City Council providing social housing (regarding it as a central government responsibility) and advocated reducing the number of cycleways in the Wellington CBD. In response, Mayor of Wellington Tory Whanau defended the council's rate increases as a response to decades of "under-investment" in public infrastructure and utilities. Chung has positioned himself as a pro-business candidate who would not raise council rates, claiming that his opponents Whanau and former Labour cabinet minister Andrew Little would raise taxes and council spending.

In May 2024, Chung confirmed that he would be running for the Mayor of Wellington at the 2025 Wellington mayoral election. On 6 June 2025, Chung formally launched his mayoral campaign. Though Chung ruled out cutting "core council services" such as parks, swimming pools, libraries, community facilities, he indicated he was open to slashing Council staff numbers including its climate change team.

In October 2025, Chung lost the 2025 Wellington mayoral election to former Labour Party leader Andrew Little. Chung was the only Independent Together candidate who was elected to the Wellington City Council. He was elected as the third-place councillor for the Wharangi/Onslow-Western general ward, receiving just 44.51 votes more than fourth-placed Labour candidate Joy Gribben.

==== July 2025 email controversy ====
On 11 July 2025, Radio New Zealand reported that Chung had shared in 2023 an email with three other councillors about an alleged sexual encounter between mayor Tory Whanau and a third party. Chung said he had no idea if the rumour was true but found it "interesting" so shared it without fact checking. The three councillors that received the email were Tony Randle, Nicola Young and John Apanowicz. Young described the email as "unwise and tawdry" at the time while Randle did not believe the email ruled out Chung as a candidate. Apanowicz said he did not recall receiving the email, but that the rumours about mayor Whanau "upset" him.

The Mayor's Office confirmed Whanau had provided the controversial email to media, and Whanau herself later revealed she had been in possession of the email for a few months; following the dossier and rumours about her being spread online by Graham Bloxham, another mayoral candidate, she felt it appropriate to share the email publicly. Whanau released a public statement, condemning the email and saying she was seeking legal advice against both Chung and Bloxham, for spreading "malicious, sexist rumours" over the course of her term.

Chung described Whanau's release of the email as a "blatant political attack". Following the email's release, The Post revealed that Chung had been urged by members of his IT team to step back from the campaign out of concern for his mental wellbeing. A representative for Better Wellington claimed Chung had been receiving abusive late night phone calls which had left him exhausted and was the reason he "sometimes talks waffle."

Following the email, Chung initially said he would not apologise to Whanau as the email was never intended for her, and because "she had never apologised to him", including over an incident two years prior when she chose not to give him proxy votes at a Local Government NZ conference. Chung later backtracked and apologised to Whanau via a video statement and an email. Chung's 2023 email was condemned by Prime Minister Christopher Luxon, Leader of the Opposition Chris Hipkins, and Wellington mayoral candidate and former Labour cabinet minister Andrew Little. In addition, the philanthropist Mark Dunajtschik, who had previously supported the Independent Together campaign financially, withdrew his support following the email controversy. In addition, five Independent Together candidates Phil McConchie, Mike Petrie, Melissa Moore, Rebecca Shepherd and Lily Brown withdrew from the ticket.

=== Second term, 2025–present ===
In November 2025, Mayor Andrew Little appointed Chung as chair of the council-controlled organisations committee. The four Green-aligned councillors criticised Chung's nomination due to his smear campaign against the previous Mayor Whanau but agreed to support Little's nomination in the "interests of being constructive partners."

In late November 2025, Chung joined Little, the Labour-aligned councillors and independent conservatives in voting to review the contentious Golden Mile pedestrianisation project for three to six months. The motion passed by a margin of 12 to 4 votes, with the Green councillors opposing it.

In mid-April 2026, Chung attracted criticism from the Police and emergency authorities for leading an unauthorized search for a missing man during a flash flood in Karori. Despite Police advising members of the public not to take matters into their own hands, Chung had organised a group of volunteers to lead the search after being contacted by a distraught constituent. Wellington Area Commander Dean Sylvester subsequently complained about Chung's behaviour to Mayor Little, who said that Chung's actions breached the code of conduct for councillors. In response to media coverage in July 2026, Chung defended his actions and said that he was only at the scene to tell volunteers to contact Police.

On 18 May 2026, Chung resigned as a chair and member of the Council Controlled Organisations subcommittee to focus on constituents in his own ward. He was succeeded by Rebecca Matthews in that role.

== Personal life ==
Chung lives in Broadmeadows with his wife, two dogs and a cat.

== Electoral history ==
=== 2025 Wharangi/Onslow-Western general ward election ===
2025 Wharangi/Onslow-Western general ward election
Party	Candidate	Primary votes	%	±%	Iteration	
Party	Candidate	Primary votes	%	±%	#	Votes
Independent	Diane Calvert^{†}	5,368	26.92	+6.82	1st	5,368
Green	Rebecca Matthews^{†}	4,437	22.25	+4.96	5th	4,876
Independent Together	Ray Chung^{†}	2,813	14.11	−9.65	9th	4,496
Labour	Joy Gribben	2,992	15.00	(new)	9th	4,452
Independent	Lily Brown	1,331	6.67	(new)	5th	1,947
Independent	Kelvin Hastie	1,207	6.05	−0.92	4th	1,411
ACT Local	Ray Bowden	735	3.69	(new)	3rd	838
Independent Together	Guy Nunns	718	3.60	(new)	2nd	738
Quota		4,900	24.57	+0.32		
Informal votes		51	0.26	−0.04		
Blank votes		289	1.45	−0.79		
Turnout		19,941	58.82	+6.30		
Registered electors		33,904				
Independent hold on 1st iteration						
Green gain from Labour on 5th iteration						
Independent Together gain from Independent on 9th iteration						
^{†} incumbent
