= Mark Dunajtschik =

New Zealand businessman, property developer and philanthropist

Sir Mark Dunajtschik KNZM
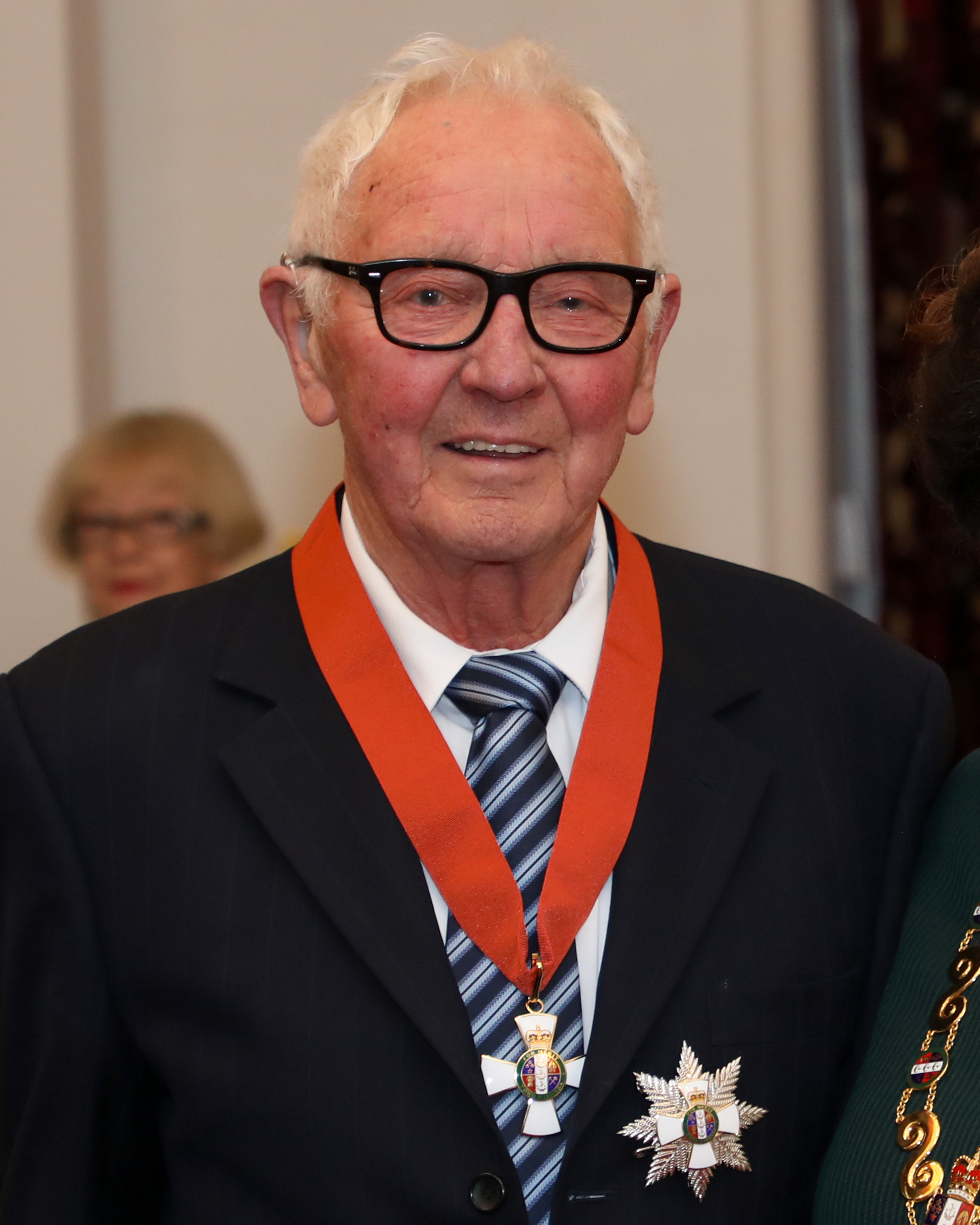
- Dunajtschik in 2023
- Born: Markus Dunajtschik; 1935 (age 90–91); Yugoslavia
- Known for: Philanthropy
- Partner: Dorothy Spotswood

Sir Markus Dunajtschik KNZM (born 1935) is a New Zealand businessman, property developer, and philanthropist. With his partner, Dorothy Spotswood, he donated $53 million towards the cost of Wellington's new children's hospital, Te Wao Nui, which was opened in September 2022.

In the 2023 New Year Honours, Dunajtschik was appointed a Knight Companion of the New Zealand Order of Merit, for services to philanthropy.

== Early life ==
Mark Dunajtschik was born to ethnically German parents in what was then Yugoslavia in 1935. When he was nine, Yugoslavian forces under Marshal Tito sent Mark, his mother and his sister to a prison camp in Knicanin. His grandmother died there. Three years later he and his mother and sister escaped via Hungary and Austria and eventually to Germany. Dunajtschik's family settled in the Black Forest in 1949, and Dunajtschik's father, who had been a prisoner of war, was able to join them a year later. Mark moved to Reutlingen when he was 15 to train as a toolmaker. While studying in Reutlingen, Dunajtschik ended up living in a home for disabled people, since it was difficult to find accommodation in post-war Germany. He states that this experience made him appreciate having a healthy mind and body and gave him insight that mentally or physically disabled people should be supported by those who are able.

After completing his training. Dunajtschik moved to Canada and spent five years travelling in South America, Australia and New Zealand. After visiting New Zealand in 1955 and then travelling back to Europe, Dunajtschik decided to settle permanently in New Zealand. He arrived in Wellington in 1958. He set up a business, Precision Grinders, making and servicing tungsten carbide tools. Dunajtschik ran the company for 28 years before selling it to his nephew in 1987.

== Property investment ==
On retirement from his business, Dunajtschik took up property investment and development as an interest. He became successful at this, at one time having over 40 commercial and investment properties in his portfolio. Property investor Bob Jones reputedly stated that “all property developers go broke and the only exception is that bugger Mark Dunajtschik, and the reason he doesn't go broke is because he keeps his property".

Dunajtschik is known for his personal, 'hands-on' approach to his properties and negotiations. Dunajtschik stated in 2011 that he only invests in properties located between Wellington Railway Station and the Basin Reserve. Buildings developed by Dunajtschik include Environment House, James Smith's, Harcourts building, HSBC Tower, and the Asteron Centre.

=== Harcourts building ===
In 2011 Dunajtschik applied to Wellington City Council for a permit to demolish the Harcourts building due to the costs of earthquake strengthening required to bring the building up to code. Dunajtschik argued that the building had lost value after the 2010 and 2011 Christchurch earthquakes, and said that although it would not fall down in a severe earthquake, the historic ornamentation on the façade was dangerous and would cost too much to make good. Engineers estimated it would cost $5 million to complete earthquake-strengthening. The Historic Places Trust was in favour of retaining the building. In May 2014 Dunajtschik won an appeal against an Environment Court ruling that had blocked his plans to demolish the building, but by November that year a second Environment Court ruling had ruled against him and he reluctantly committed to a $10 million restoration of the building. At the time Dunajtschik joked that the building would be known as "Mark's Folly".

=== Asteron Centre ===
The Asteron Centre, designed by Warren and Mahoney Architects, opened in 2010 and won a Wellington Architecture Award for commercial architecture in 2011. It suffered minor cracking in the 2013 Seddon earthquake, which reappeared in the 2016 Kaikōura earthquake. The main tenant, Inland Revenue, then evacuated its 2000 staff from the building after an engineering report raised concerns about earthquake resistance. Dunajtschik said at the time that the building was safe and would be remediated. In July 2021 Inland Revenue again evacuated its staff from the building after a new engineering report indicated possible problems. The building was strengthened during 2022, and Dunajtschik said that receiving the new code of compliance from Wellington City Council was the highlight of his year.

== Philanthropy ==
Dunajtschik has supported many charities including the Wellington Free Ambulance, Hohepa (an organisation providing disability support), the Graeme Dingle Foundation and the Heart Trust. Dunajtschik enabled the setting up of Wellington's rescue helicopter service Life Flight Trust in 1975, when he paid for a helicopter for pilot Peter Button. Dunajtschik funded the service for ten years until commercial sponsorship was secured.

=== Victoria University of Wellington ===
In 2016 Dunajtschik donated $2 million to Victoria University to fund a Chair in sustainable energy systems, to be known as the Mark Dunajtschik Chair of Sustainable Energy. This will enable the university to set up a programme in sustainable energy systems. In 2023 Dunajtschik donated $10 million to Victoria University to set up a mechanical engineering department. A laboratory and a research centre named after Dunajtschik will be established. Dunajtschik said that engineering had given him his beginning in life and that he wanted to enable other people to use their engineering skills to work in different places in the world.

=== Wellington Children's Hospital Te Wao Nui ===
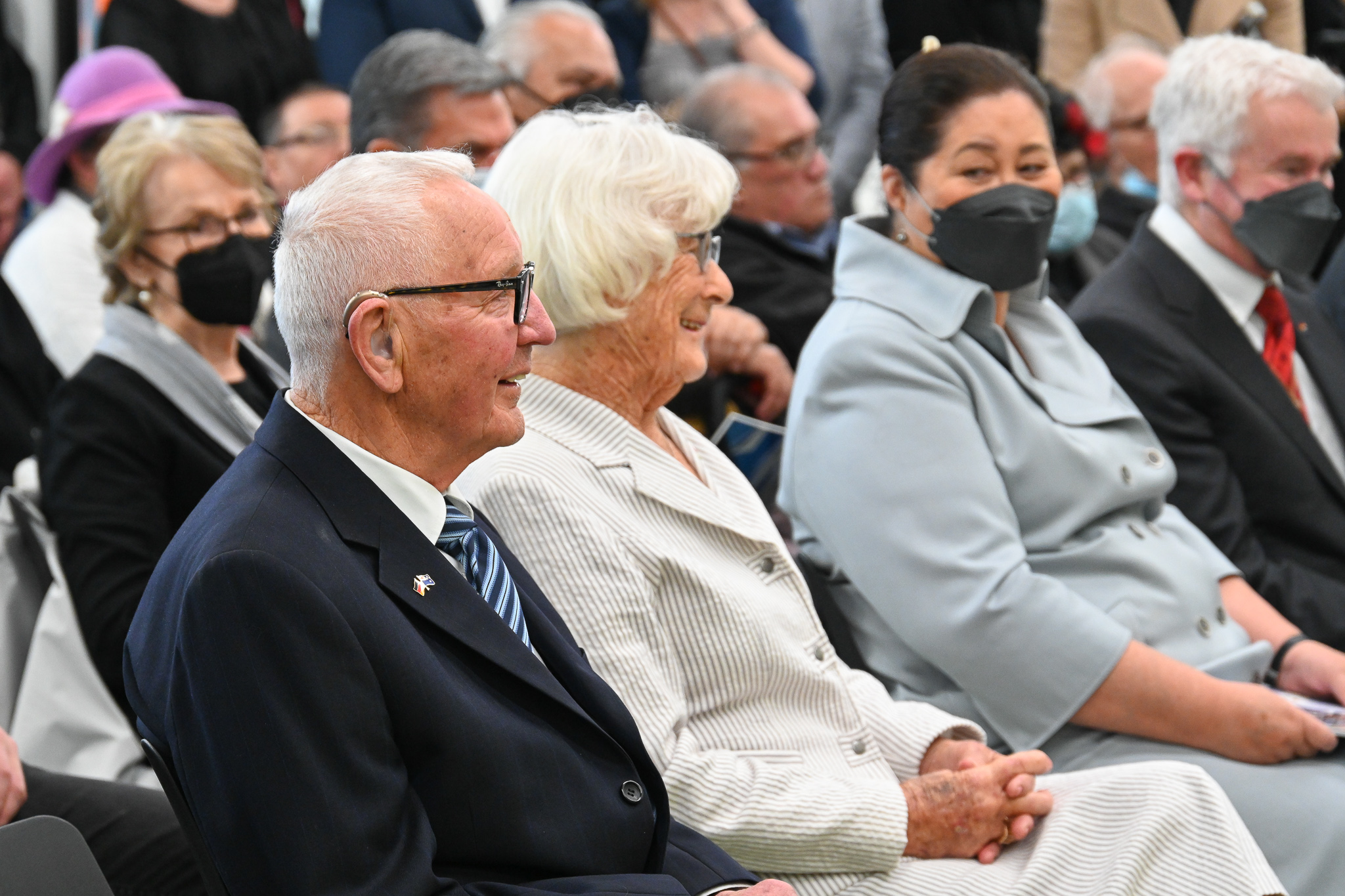
Dunajtschik (left) and Dorothy Spotswood (second from left) at the opening of Te Wao Nui on 30 September 2022

In 2017 Dunajtschik and his partner Dorothy Spotswood committed $53 million to build a new children's hospital at Wellington Hospital. Initially approached for a donation, Dunajtschik declared that he could build the hospital himself more cheaply and quickly than if it was left up to government. He said "most benefactors write out a cheque, but in this case, that wouldn't get nearly as much done for the money. I can use my skill as a builder and developer to get the maximum value out of the $50m I'm donating for our children." The project took five years and cost $100 million, with the government adding almost $46 million to Dunajtschik's contribution. Deeply involved with the design of the building, Dunajtschik expressed some frustration with the bureaucratic process along the way. Construction began in 2019 and the new hospital received its first patients in October 2022. The new hospital service was named Te Wao Nui and the building was named the Mark Dunajtschik and Dorothy Spotswood Building.

=== Legacy ===
Dunajtschik announced in May 2023 that his estate will be vested in a foundation in his name, to be managed by the Nikau Foundation. The new foundation will give grants to support people with intellectual and physical disabilities.

== Political involvement ==
In the lead up to the 2025 Wellington City Council election, Dunajtschik donated between NZ$20,000-25,000 to mayoral candidate Ray Chung, the leader of the centre-right Independent Together ticket. In July 2025, Dunajtschik withdrew his support for Chung following revelations that the latter had circulated an email containing unsubstantiated sexual allegations against the incumbent Mayor of Wellington Tory Whanau in 2023. Dunajtschik also released a press release stating:

"Assuming the recent media reports, about dirty politics, are correct, I am disappointed. I do not support that behaviour nor will I support any candidates who engage in it. I urge all candidates to engage in a clean campaign and address the important and urgent issues facing the city, they should play the ball, not the person."

== Honours and awards ==
In 2017 Dunajtschik won the business category of the 'Wellingtonian of the Year' awards, and was named the supreme winner, 'Wellingtonian of the Year', for his philanthropic work. Dunajtschik stated at the time: "Wellington has been good to me and I want to be good to Wellington".

In 2020 the Property Council awarded Dunajtschik a lifetime membership award, the 'Property Council New Zealand Members’ Laureate', in recognition of his 20 years in the property industry and charitable work. The Property Council said Dunajtschik was “a shining example of ‘property for good’, consistently breaking the often-negative connotations that come with the role of property developer”.

Dunajtschik was appointed a Knight Companion of the New Zealand Order of Merit in the 2023 New Year Honours, for services to philanthropy.

In 2023 Dunajtschik was named 'Senior New Zealander of the Year' at the Kiwibank New Zealander of the Year Awards.

== Personal life ==
Dunajtschik met his partner Dorothy Spotswood, who is also his business partner, at the Overland Club in Wellington in the 1960s. Dunajtschik had founded the club after a trip overland by motorbike from New Zealand to Europe in 1955, before he decided to settle permanently in Wellington. The couple never married and have no children. Dunajtschik became a New Zealand citizen around 2019.
