= Tory Whanau =

New Zealand politician (born 1983)

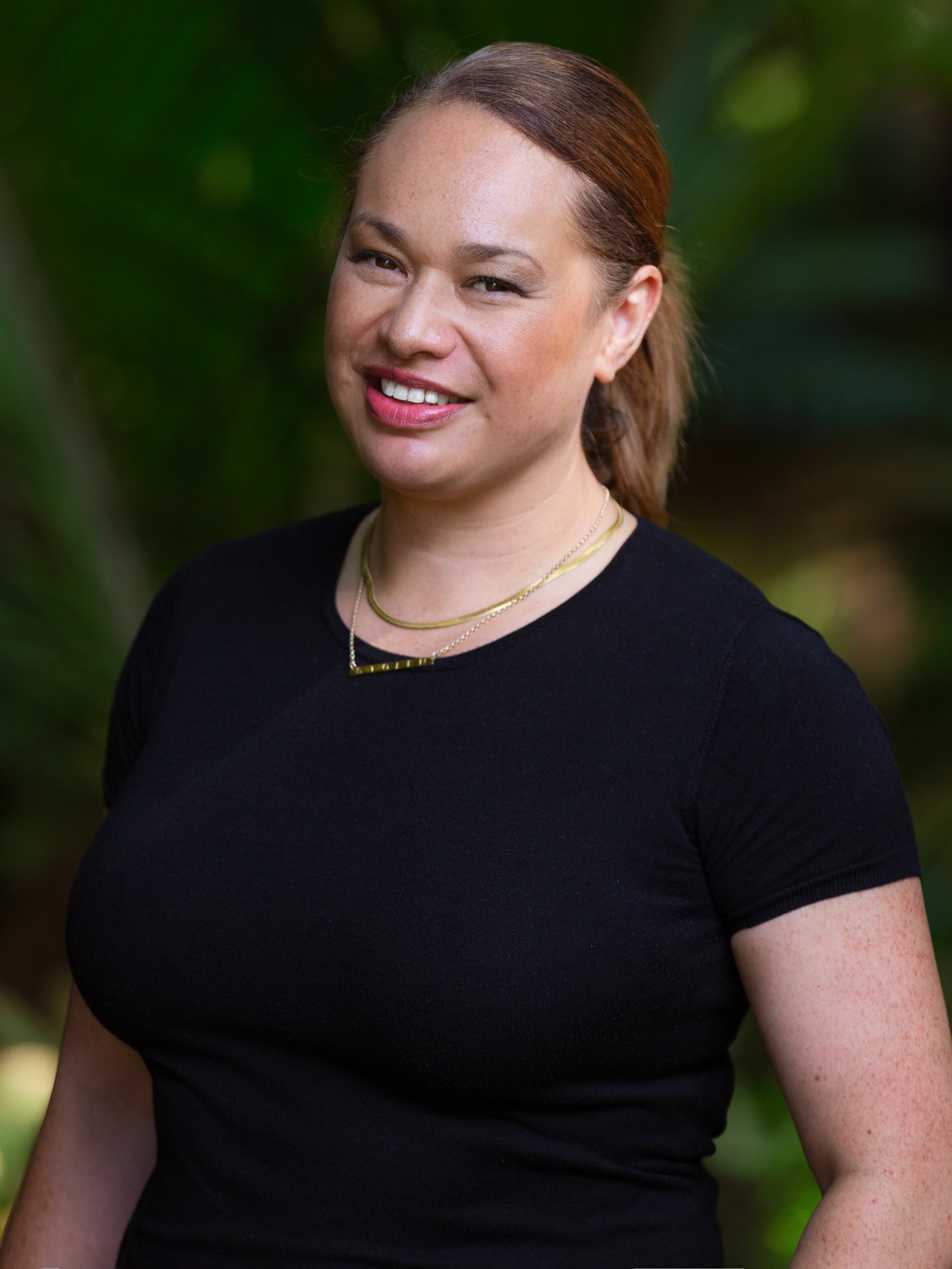
- Whanau in 2025

37th Mayor of Wellington
- In office 15 October 2022 – 17 October 2025
- Deputy: Laurie Foon
- Preceded by: Andy Foster
- Succeeded by: Andrew Little

Parliamentary chief of staff for the Green Party of Aotearoa New Zealand
- In office 2017–2021
- Preceded by: Deborah Morris-Travers
- Succeeded by: Robin Campbell

Personal details
- Born: 1983 (age 42–43) Porirua, New Zealand
- Party: Green
- Education: Victoria (BA); Massey (PGDipBusAdmin)

Tory Awatere Whanau (born 1983) is a former New Zealand politician. She was elected mayor of Wellington at the 2022 election, but did not seek re-election in 2025. Previously she served as the parliamentary chief of staff for the Green Party.

Whanau was the first person of Māori descent to be mayor of Wellington.

== Early life and education ==
Whanau has ancestors from Pakakohi and Ngāruahine. She was born in Porirua in 1983 and grew up in Cannons Creek, Porirua. Whanau moved with her family to Pātea at the age of 8, later attending New Plymouth Girls' High School. Whanau moved to Wellington as an adult to study, and in 2003 won $1.39 million in a Lotto draw, which she used to pay off her parents' mortgage, support her family, and travel.

Whanau graduated with a Bachelor of Arts in media studies from Victoria University of Wellington in 2006 and a Postgraduate Diploma in Business and Administration in Communication Management from Massey University in 2012.

== Career ==
After graduating from Victoria University of Wellington, Whanau worked for the New Zealand Film Commission as a business affairs and short film assistant. Her career was mainly in marketing and digital communications, with roles with financial services firms such as Axa, TWUSUPER, and Cigna, as well as the New Zealand charity Plunket.

Whanau entered politics in 2015 when she worked for the parliamentary wing of the Green Party of Aotearoa New Zealand. During the 2017 general election, she was the party's digital director and became acting chief of staff when Deborah Morris-Travers resigned in August 2017. After the 2017 and 2020 elections, Whanau was a member of the Green Party's team in the negotiations that led to the formations of the resulting government. Whanau resigned as chief of staff in August 2021, intending to form a public relations consultancy firm with Matthew Tukaki, Deborah Mahuta-Coyle and Nevada Halbert, but instead joined the firm Capital Government Relations.

== Mayor of Wellington ==
=== 2022 Wellington mayoral election ===
Whanau announced her intention on 18 November 2021 to run for the Wellington mayoralty in the 2022 election, and formally launched her campaign on 30 June 2022. She ran as an independent, endorsed by the Green party. She gained the mayoralty with 34,462 votes after the distribution of preferences, more than twice those gained by the incumbent Andy Foster.

Whanau's stated policy platform was "Fixing our pipes; More warm, dry homes for all; More efficient public transport options; Mental health support, alcohol and harm reduction; Safer streets; Arts and culture revitalisation; Business support; Climate action." She was seen as one of the few progressive candidates to gain mayoral office in the 2022 local elections, with most New Zealand territorial authorities swinging to conservative candidates.

=== Mayoral term, 2022—2025 ===
Following the 2022 Wellington local elections, Whanau reduced the number of full council committees on the Wellington City Council from five to three. Following a month of negotiations and restructuring, she appointed several Labour and Green councillors as chairs of these three council committees (Rebecca Matthews, Teri O'Neill and Tamatha Paul). Whanau did not renew her Green membership when it came up for renewal in November 2022. Georgina Campbell from The New Zealand Herald wrote that this was in order to build better relationships with independent councillors without a formal party membership. Whanau later reversed this decision and rejoined the Green Party in 2024.

In November 2023, Whanau reversed her previous opposition to the Wellington City Council selling its 34 percent stake in Wellington Airport to cover the Council's financial deficit. On 9 November, Whanau and a majority of councillors voted to consult the public about the plan. In addition, Whanau and her fellow councillors voted unanimously to scrap $230 million worth of repairs to Te Ngākau Civic Square and the City to Sea Bridge, and to scrap about $35 million worth of funding for cycleways and footpaths.

In mid-March 2024, Whanau supported a plan to permit for more housing construction in Wellington by upzoning vast areas of the city. She said this would make housing more affordable and lower emissions.

In April 2024, the Wellington City Council cancelled a NZ$32 million agreement with cinema chain Reading Cinemas to refurbish and earthquake-strengthen its Wellington building, which has been closed since 2019. In 2023, Whanau and the Wellington City Council had approved efforts by Council staff to negotiate the NZ$32 million agreement to refurbish and earthquake-strengthen the Wellington cinema. Whanau described the outcome as "disappointing, but the right one."

In late May 2024, the Wellington City Council voted in favour of divesting its 34% minority stake (worth NZ$278 million) in Wellington Airport, with the proceeds going towards a major disaster investment fund. In response, Whanau said that divestment had not been her preference but that we "had to put political alliances aside and decided what is best for the city." On 10 October 2024, following an attempt by a group of councillors to bring another vote on the issue, councillors voted nine to seven against the sale. Whanau expressed disappointment with the outcome but said she respected her fellow councillors' decision. On 17 October, Whanau met with Local Government Minister Simeon Brown and said that the New Zealand Government was not considering intervening in the Wellington City Council despite criticism of the Council's financial management by Finance Minister Nicola Willis.

On 22 October 2024, the New Zealand Government appointed a Crown observer to Wellington City Council after the Council was forced to revise its 2023–2024 Long Term Plan in response to a failed attempt to sell its airport shares. In response, Whanau said that she would discuss the draft terms of reference with councillors and that the Council would cooperate with the Government. Whanau later criticised several government ministers for using emotive language in criticising the council's governance and financial management, saying "we need assistance, not punching down." In response, ACT leader David Seymour said the Government was criticising the Council's "poor decisions" rather than its people while New Zealand First leader Winston Peters accused Whanau of being blind to the city's problems. Finance Minister Willis said that the Government was listening to Wellingtonians' frustration and dissatisfaction with the Council.

In February 2025, the Council announced that it would begin construction of the Golden Mile revitalisation project, which includes the Beehive end of Lambton Quay and Courtenay Place area, starting in late April 2025 on Cambridge and Kent Terrace. This project aimed to prioritise public transport, improve walking and cycling access, reduce reliance on cars, widen footpaths, and build separated bi-directional bike lanes in the area. Wellington Chamber of Commerce chief executive Simon Arcus expressed concern that these changes could affect local businesses and emphasised the need for consultation. On the morning of 28 April 2025, Whanau turned the first sod on a project's first stage of redeveloping the Golden Mile. In mid-June 2026, the Wellington City Council voted by 14 to 3 votes not to continue with the Golden Mile project, and to instead focus on local transport corridor improvements and urban regeneration in Courtenay Place.

=== 2025 re-election campaign ===
In early February 2025, Whanau stated that she would run for re-election in the 2025 Wellington mayoral election. However, on 29 April, Whanau pulled out of the Wellington mayoral election and endorsed former Labour politician Andrew Little for mayor. Whanau confirmed that she would instead contest Wellington's Māori ward during the 2025 Wellington local elections, and would also support other Green candidates running for the Wellington City Council.

On 11 July 2025, Radio New Zealand reported that Wellington City councillor and Independent Together ticket leader Ray Chung had shared in 2023 an email with fellow councillors Tony Randle, Nicola Young and John Apanowicz about an alleged sexual encounter between Whanau and a third party. The Mayor's Office confirmed Whanau had provided the controversial email to media, and Whanau herself later revealed she had been in possession of the email for a few months; following the dossier and rumours about her being spread online by Graham Bloxham, another mayoral candidate, she felt it appropriate to share the email publicly. Whanau released a public statement, condemning the email and saying she was seeking legal advice against both Chung and Bloxham, for spreading "malicious, sexist rumours" over the course of her term.

Chung described Whanau's release of the email as a "blatant political attack". He said he would not apologise to Whanau as the email was never intended for her, and because "she had never apologised to him", including over an incident two years prior when she chose not to give him proxy votes at a Local Government NZ conference. Chung later backtracked and apologised to Whanau. Chung was criticised by Prime Minister Christopher Luxon, Leader of the Opposition Chris Hipkins, and Wellington mayoral candidate Andrew Little. In addition, the philanthropist Mark Dunajtschik terminated his financial support for the Independent Together campaign. Five Independent Together candidates Phil McConchie, Mike Petrie, Melissa Moore, Rebecca Shepherd and Lily Brown withdrew from the ticket.

Whanau lost her election race for the Māori ward to Labour candidate Matthew Reweti. Provisional results had Whanau winning 713 votes to Reweti's 1,042.

== Personal life ==
Whanau has struggled with alcoholism. Two incidents related to her alcohol consumption received media attention during her mayoralty. On 30 June 2023, a Friday evening, Whanau appeared to employees to be intoxicated upon entry to The Old Quarter restaurant in Dixon Street. Restaurant staff refused to serve her due to her intoxicated state, and she left without paying her bill. Whanau admitted not paying her bill and being "tipsy" but denied that she had acted confrontationally towards staff members, including asking if they knew who she was. The bill was paid the next day, on 1 July. On 18 November 2023, Whanau was seen intoxicated at Wellington’s Havana Bar. Almost two weeks later, she released a written statement which admitted a drinking problem and that she was seeking professional help. In 2025, she spoke at an event saying that the humiliation she had felt through this period led her to consider resigning.

In April 2024, Whanau was diagnosed with attention deficit hyperactivity disorder and "significant traits of autism".

In September 2024, Whanau said on radio that she had sold her car "to help pay the bills", despite her mayoral salary of $189,799. A few days later she denied that was the reason, and said she sold her car to walk to work. A spokesperson later clarified that she sold her car to help with her mortgage.

In November 2025, Whanau announced that she would move to Melbourne due to a tight job market in Wellington. In 2026 she became a campaign manager for an Australian Greens candidate, Izzy Scherrer, in the seat of South Barwon at the 2026 Victorian state election.

Political offices
Preceded by Andy Foster	Mayor of Wellington; 2022–2025	Succeeded by Andrew Little
