= Independent Together =

Local body ticket in Wellington

- Leader: Ray Chung
- Founded: 2025
- Colours: Gold/Yellow; Black
- Wellington City Council: 1 / 15

Website
- voteforit.nz

Independent Together (IT) are a local-body political ticket in Wellington, New Zealand, that was established in 2025 to contest that year's city council election. The group is led by incumbent city councillor Ray Chung.

The group is fiscally conservative (with their key policy being zero rates increases during the 2025–2028 term) and they oppose party politics on council. They have been criticised for ties to conspiracy groups, their policies, and other controversies involving the actions of their candidates. Alongside running for the mayoralty, Chung ran to retain his seat on the council for the Wharangi/Onslow-Western ward. Five other candidates ran for councillor positions.

Chung placed third in the mayoral election, with 10.5% of the vote, behind Andrew Little and Karl Tiefenbacher. Chung was the only IT candidate elected to council.

== Positions and platform ==
The group was formed by incumbent Wellington city councillor Ray Chung. The group campaigned on what they described as their "five pillars"; these included a commitment to zero rates increases, getting council back to basics (focusing spending on water infrastructure, rubbish collection, parks, and roads), reducing council debt, improving transportation access to the city, rejecting party politics, and a safer Wellington.

The key promise made by the group was that they would not increase rates in the following term, if elected. As of April 2025, the group had yet to decide what would be cut to achieve this. Talking to RNZ's Morning Report in June, Chung was not yet firm on what would be cut, only stressing that it would not be essential services. He mentioned cutting council payroll, saying he had "no idea what a lot of these people do." Chung himself would personally campaign against the Golden Mile project.

Incumbent Green mayor Tory Whanau and other left-of-centre city councillors rebutted the group's stance on rates increases, with councillor Rebecca Matthews going as far to say that the claim that city services could be maintained while achieving zero rates increases was "a lie". Andrew Little, fellow mayoral candidate and former leader of the Labour Party, called the no-rates-increases policy "not credible".

Better Wellington's Alistair Boyce said a NZ$2.8b savings proposal by Infratil's Louise Tong could provide a "blueprint" for achieving the zero rates increases, included cutting NZ$700,000,000 from staff costs, partially converting the Tākina convention centre for apartments or offices, stopping the Golden Mile revamp of central Wellington, stopping organic waste collection, and spending less on earthquake-strengthening for identified at-risk buildings. Other elements of Tong's proposal, such as shutting down Wellington Zoo, were ruled out by Chung.

Chung also proposed to negotiate with central government for NZ$439,000,000 of social housing upgrades, though government ministers were non-committal on this plan. Chung expressed a desire to cut around 17% of council staff by mid-2026. He also confirmed that the zero rates promise could be unattainable in the first year.

The group would also campaign on opposing party politics on the city council. Chung says he has never belonged to any political party. According to Chung, the media and some of his colleagues had stated that the group was "a right-wing party" but he rejected this, saying he did not know what the political affiliations of any of the candidates were.

== Campaign ==
=== Launch ===
Chung held his mayoral campaign launch in June at the Public Trust Building to a crowd of over 200 people. Philanthropist Mark Dunajtschik and former National MP Aaron Gilmore were in attendance. Alistair Boyce of Better Wellington launched the event, saying the mayoral race was a two-horse race; "It's a Little versus honest Ray" he said. Broadcaster Peter Williams introduced Chung. Williams criticised "abhorrent" and "undemocratic" mana whenua representation on local councils. A video of old footage of Wellington (Lord of the Rings red carpets and CubaDupa dancing) was contrasted with newer footage (vacant stores and empty streets). Chung, in a voiceover, talked about his career and the need for "more common sense" and "better financial management". Boyce welcomed Chung to the stage, saying he was the "hope for the downtrodden ratepayer" and a "nemesis of the deep state".

Chung reiterated his commitment to zero rates increases. He supported a smaller council and growing Wellington's population. Chung claimed the city council was paying $2 million a week servicing its debts. Councillor Geordie Rogers claimed that this figure was wrong and that it was actually $1.2m a week, which the council confirmed was correct. Chung admitted the number used in his speech was incorrect.

The group's campaign manager is Libby Carson.

=== Dossier on Labour-aligned candidates ===
In July, the Better Wellington group behind the Independent Together ticket was revealed to have compiled a dossier on Labour-aligned candidates. The dossier was described as "clumsy and conspiratorial" by media. It mocked political opponents for things like being "pro-Māori", believing in climate change, and wearing face masks during the COVID-19 pandemic. Better Wellington's spokesperson Alistair Boyce said the researcher had split from the group "acrimoniously", and confirmed they had been hired by controversial New Zealand First activist Rhys Williams. The group denied their connection with Williams in an email to councillors, saying that Williams was only a friend of Glenn Inwood.

Candidate Lily Brown also received criticism for making misleading statements about Labour mayoral candidate Andrew Little on social media. She had asked if he would sign a pledge that he would not consult with the Labour party, but she later incorrectly tweeted that the question had been whether he would put Wellingtonians ahead of his party affiliation, and incorrectly claimed that Little had answered "no". In a statement, she walked back her claims. Little described the incident as a "political stunt" and "gross stuff".

Better Wellington also ran social media posts mocking and attacking councillor Ben McNulty—who they nicknamed "McNumpty"—and accused him of promoting "child councillors". McNulty described the attacks as "grubby election tactics".

=== Chung email scandal ===
On 11 July 2025, Radio New Zealand's Morning Report reported that Chung had shared an email in 2023 with three other councillors about an alleged sexual encounter between mayor Whanau and a third party. The three councillors who received the email were Tony Randle, Nicola Young and John Apanowicz. Young told the New Zealand Herald that she told Chung the email was "unwise and tawdry" at the time. Randle defended Chung's suitability as a candidate while Apanowicz denied receiving the rumours but said that the rumours about mayor Whanau "upset" him. In response, Chung admitted the email had been sent, but claimed that Whanau's release of the email was a "blatant political attack".

In response, Whanau released a public statement, condemning the email and saying she was seeking legal advice against both Chung and the owner of the Wellington LIVE Facebook page, Graham Bloxham, for spreading "malicious, sexist rumours" over the course of her term. Chung initially refused to apologise to Whanau for the email but later backtracked following public criticism. He published a video expressing regret for his actions and later apologised to Whanau via email.

Chung was criticised by Prime Minister Christopher Luxon and Opposition Leader Chris Hipkins for his 2023 email. Mayoral candidate Andrew Little also chastised Chung for sending the email, saying that if he was elected mayor he would have "zero tolerance" for the behaviour. In addition, the philanthropist Dunajtschik withdrew his support for the Independent Together campaign in response to Chung's 2023 email.

== Supporters and backers ==
=== Better Wellington ===
The ticket is closely tied to and financed by the right-wing campaign group Better Wellington. Better Wellington's Alistair Boyce has also acted as a spokesperson and campaign manager for Chung.

Some publications have more closely aligned the two groups; in his column for The Spinoff, Joel MacManus called Better Wellington a "surrogate campaign" for Chung, while Salient's Darcy Lawrey called Independent Together "the electoral wing of Better Wellington".

=== Glenn Inwood and Resistance Kiwi ===
Independent Together and Chung have been accused of having links to controversial conspiracy groups. An analysis by digital investigator Keith Ng showed that websites for Ray Chung and Independent Together were hosted on the same server as anti-government conspiracy group Resistance Kiwi. Chung denied knowledge of the connection, saying that the website was set up for him by controversial right-wing political organiser Glenn Inwood, who also operates Resistance Kiwi.

Chung said in May that he was "very concerned" to learn of Inwood's history as a tobacco and whaling lobbyist, but had been unaware of the controversies as "no one [had] mentioned this before" in the six years he had known Inwood.

== Finances ==
In June, Chung stated that he had received between $150,000 and $200,000 in donations, with "in the range of $20-$25K" coming from philanthropist Mark Dunajtschik.

== Polling ==
A Curia Market Research poll in February had Chung as the candidate with the most name recognition and with the highest approval rating, though this was before Andrew Little entered the race.

== Candidates ==
Independent Together candidates by ward. (Yellow circle indicates a candidate and grey circle indicates no candidate)

2025 candidates
Candidate	Photo	Ward	Notes
Ray Chung		Onslow-Western / Wharangi	Mayoral candidate
Ken Ah Kuoi		Motukairangi/Eastern	
Michelle McGuire		Motukairangi/Eastern	
Paula Muollo		Paekawakawa/Southern	
Guy Nunns		Wharangi/Onslow-Western	
Stuart Wong		Pukehīnau/Lambton	
Left the group after campaign launch
Lily Brown		Wharangi/Onslow-Western	Stood as an independent.
Andrea Compton		Takapū/Northern	Stood and won as an independent.
Dan Milward		Pukehīnau/Lambton	Stood as an independent.

=== Withdrawals ===
Phil McConchie, Mike Petrie, Melissa Moore and Rebecca Shepherd had each withdrawn from the group prior to the official campaign launch.

Candidate Lily Brown announced in mid-July that she would no longer campaign as part of Independent Together but as an independent, following the email and dossier scandals. She said she did not support the "tactics or political approach" of Better Wellington. Andrea Compton and Dan Milward subsequently left the group.

Following the withdrawals, the remaining candidates confirmed they were "100% committed" to the group, and that two new potential candidates were considering joining the ticket. However, when the finalised nominations were released in early August, no additional candidates were listed as running on the IT ticket.

== Results ==
In the 2025 elections, Ray Chung was the only Independent Together elected to the Wellington City Council. Chung was elected as the third-place councillor for the Wharangi/Onslow-Western general ward, receiving just 44.51 votes more than fourth-placed Labour candidate Joy Gribben.

Election	# of candidates				Winning candidates			
Election	Mayor	Council	Board	Regional council	Mayor	Council	Board	Regional council
2025	1	6	–	–	0 / 1	1 / 6	–	–

== See also ==
- Local elections in New Zealand
