= 2019 Greater Wellington Regional Council election =

Elections in New Zealand

← 2016	12 October 2019	2022 →
- Position of Greater Wellington within New Zealand

The 2019 Greater Wellington Regional Council election was a local election held from 20 September until 12 October in the Greater Wellington region of New Zealand as part of that year's nation-wide local elections. Voters elected thirteen regional councillors for the 2019–2022 term of the Greater Wellington Regional Council. Postal voting and the single transferable vote system were used.

== Greater Wellington Regional Council ==
=== Councillors standing down ===
By July 2019 four councillors had announced that they would not be standing for re-election to the Wellington Regional Council; Sue Kedgley, Chris Laidlaw, Ian McKinnon and Paul Swain. The GWRC has been "under fire" for changes to the bus services, particularly in Wellington city.

Names in bold font identify successful candidates.

=== Kapiti Coast constituency (1) ===
2019 Greater Wellington Regional Council election: Kapiti Coast constituency
Affiliation	Candidate	Primary vote	%
**Independent**	**Penny Gaylor**	**10,243**	**60.72**
Independent	Neil Mackay	6,625	39.28
Turnout		16,868	41.71
Registered		40,438	

=== Poneke/Wellington constituency (5) ===
2019 Greater Wellington Regional Council election: Poneke/Wellington constituency
Affiliation	Candidate	Primary vote	%	Final vote (Note: Rounded to whole number.)
**Green**	**Thomas Nash**	**9,173**	**18.36**	**7,836**
**Independent**	**Roger Blakeley**	**5,970**	**11.95**	**7,840**
**Wellington Party**	**Glenda Hughes**	**5,658**	**11.33**	**7,832**
**Labour**	**Daran Ponter**	**5,148**	**10.30**	**7,844**
**Independent**	**David Lee**	**3,787**	**7.58**	**7,851**
Independent	Victoria Rhodes-Carlin	3,326	6.66	7,326
Independent	Helene Ritchie	4,046	8.10	
Independent	Jill Ford	2,205	4.41	
Independent	Tony de Lorenzo	1,383	2.76	
Independent	Sam Somers	1,292	2.58	
Independent	Phil Quin	1,271	2.54	
Wellington Party	Troy Mihaka	1,168	2.33	
Wellington Party	Philip O'Brien	1,150	2.30	
Independent	Gavin Bruce	1,125	2.25	
Independent	Lesleigh Salinger	989	1.98	
Independent	Tony Jansen	816	1.63	
Independent	Alexander Garside	788	1.57	
Independent	Anand Kochunny	637	1.27	
Independent	John Klaphake	606	1.21	
Independent	Bryce Pender	557	1.11	
Independent	Yvonne Legarth	521	1.04	
Independent	Deane Milne	166	0.33	
Independent	Ray Wilson	115	0.23	
Informal		749	1.49	
Blank		3,430	6.86	
Turnout		49,936	33.69	
Registered		148,191		

=== Porirua-Tawa constituency (2) ===
2019 Greater Wellington Regional Council election: Porirua-Tawa constituency
Affiliation	Candidate	Primary vote	%	Final vote
Independent	**Jenny Brash**	**5,724**	**28.55**	**6,280**
Independent	**Chris Kirk-Burnnand**	**4,061**	**20.26**	**5,997**
Labour	Phillip Marshall	2,583	12.88	4,064
Independent	Roger Watkin	1,846	9.21	
Independent	Barbara Donaldson	1,675	8.35	
Independent	Natalie Repia	1,477	7.36	
Independent	Vaughn Liley	799	3.98	
Informal		99	0.49	
Blank		1,779	8.87	
Turnout		20,043		

=== Te Awa Kairangi ki Tai/Lower Hutt constituency (3) ===
2019 Greater Wellington Regional Council election: Te Awa Kairangi ki Tai/Lower Hutt constituency
Affiliation	Candidate	Primary vote	%	Final vote
**Independent**	**Ken Laban**	**7,719**	**26.74**	**7,886**
**Independent**	**Prue Lamason**	**5,046**	**17.48**	**7,577**
**Green**	**Josh van Lier**	**5,723**	**19.82**	**7,163**
Independent	Peter Glensor	3,306	11.45	4,904
Independent	David Ogden	3,409	11.80	
Independent	Leonie Dobbs	3,251	11.26	
Informal		842	2.91	
Blank		2,062	7.14	
Turnout		28,866	39.11	
Registered		73,807		

=== Te Awa Kairangi ki Uta/Upper Hutt constituency (1) ===
2019 Greater Wellington Regional Council election: Te Awa Kairangi ki Uta/Upper Hutt constituency
Affiliation	Candidate	Primary vote	%	Final vote
**Independent**	**Ros Connelly**	**4,511**	**36.53**	**6,475**
Independent	Bill Hammond	3,439	27.85	4,970
Independent	Steve Pattinson	2,484	20.11	
Wellington Party	Mark Crofskey	2,153	17.43	
Informal		37	0.29	
Blank		688	5.57	
Turnout		12,347	40.48	
Registered		30,501		

=== Wairarapa constituency (1) ===
2019 Greater Wellington Regional Council election: Wairarapa constituency
Affiliation	Candidate	Primary vote	%	Final vote
**Independent**	**Adrienne Staples**	**7,581**	**45.78**	**8,703**
Independent	Pim Borren	5,628	33.99	6,784
Independent	Richard Moore	3,254	19.65	
Informal		35	0.21	
Blank		1,231	7.43	
Turnout		16,557	49.14	
Registered		33,693		
