= 2025 Lower Hutt mayoral election =

- 11 October 2025
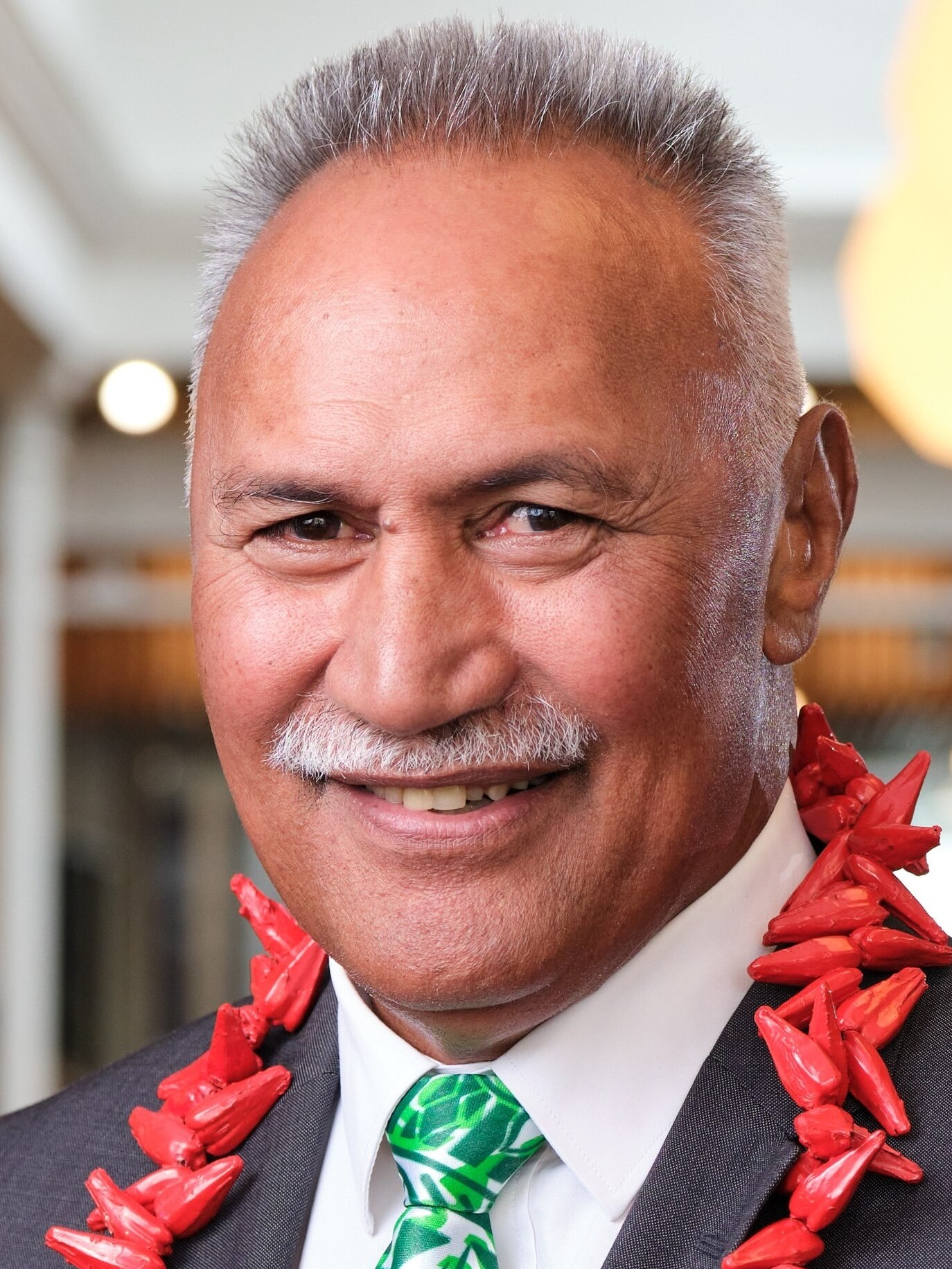

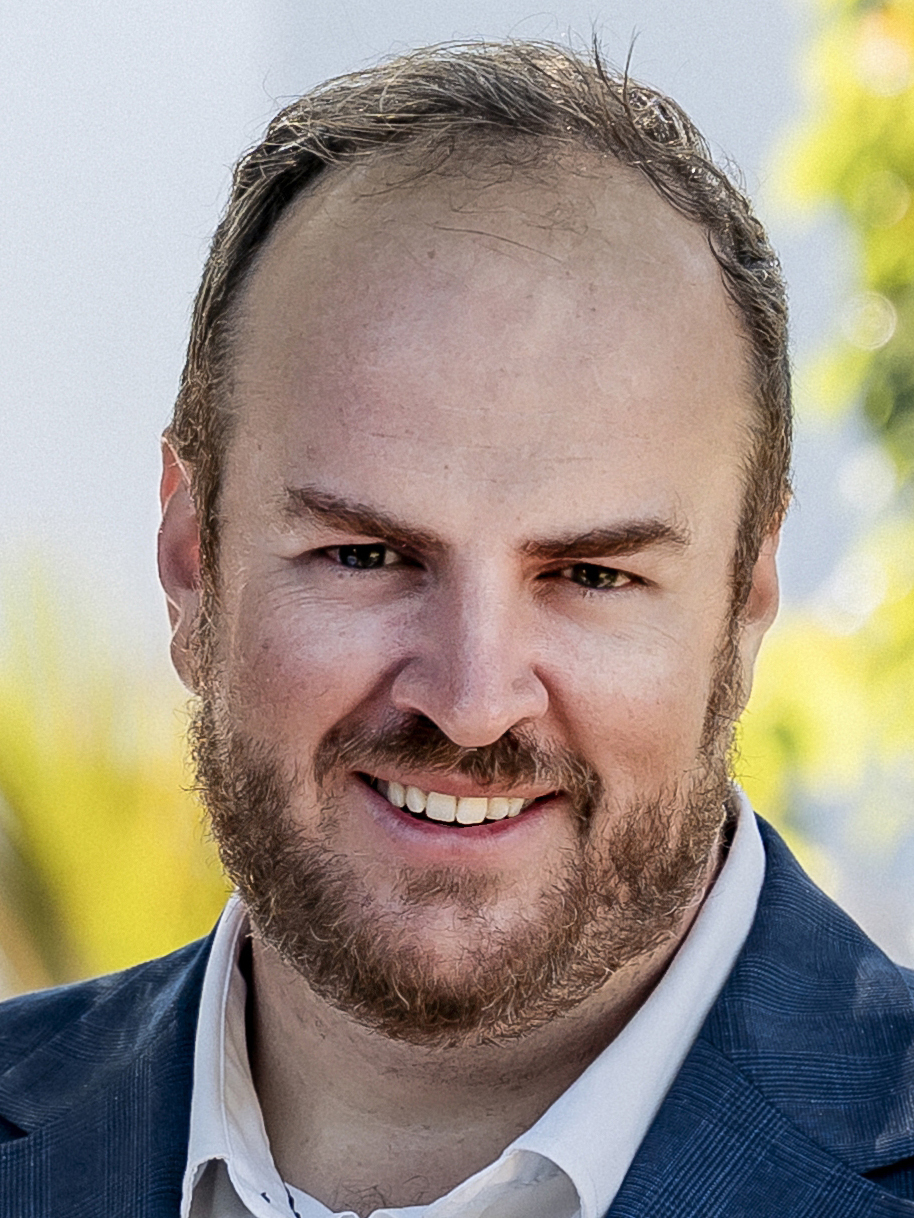
Candidate	Ken Laban	Brady Dyer
Affiliation	Independent	Independent
Popular vote	8,704	6,974
Percentage	34.48%	27.63%
Candidate	Karen Morgan	Prabha Ravi
Affiliation	Independent	Independent
Popular vote	5,529	3,608
Percentage	21.90%	14.29%
Mayor before election
Campbell Barry
Labour
Elected mayor
Ken Laban
Independent

The 2025 Lower Hutt mayoral election was a local election held from 9 September to 11 October in Lower Hutt, New Zealand, as part of that year's council election and nation-wide local elections. Voters elected the mayor of Lower Hutt for the 2025–2028 term. Postal voting and the first-past-the-post voting system were used. The incumbent mayor Campbell Barry did not seek re-election.

Ken Laban was elected as mayor, becoming New Zealand's first Pasifika mayor.

== Key dates ==
- 4 July 2025: Nominations for candidates opened
- 1 August 2025: Nominations for candidates closed at 12 pm
- 9 September 2025: Voting documents were posted and voting opened
- 11 October 2025: Voting closed at 12 pm and progress/preliminary results were published
- 16–19 October 2025: Final results were declared.

== Background ==
Incumbent mayor Campbell Barry decided not to seek re-election for a third term as mayor.

== Candidates ==
Candidate	Photo	Affiliation (Note: A candidate could leave their affiliation blank, run as an independent, or run with an affiliation to an organisation, local body ticket or political party. Hutt City Council did not allow whānau, hapū, or iwi details to be used for the affiliation.)	Notes
Brady Dyer		Independent	Councillor for the at-large ward since 2019. Also ran for re-election as a councillor.
Ken Laban		None	Greater Wellington regional councillor for the Te Awa Kairangi ki Tai/Lower Hutt constituency since 2013
Karen Morgan		Independent	Councillor since 2022, and former principal of Taita College
Prabha Ravi		Independent	Founder and artistic director of Natraj School of Dance. Also ran as a councillor for the at-large ward.

== Mayoral results ==
Sports commentator and former councillor Fauono Ken Laban was elected mayor, becoming New Zealand's first Pasifika mayor.

2025 Lower Hutt mayoral election
Party	Candidate	Votes	%	±%
Independent	Ken Laban	11,282	34.15	(new)
Independent	Brady Dyer	9,068	27.45	(new)
Independent	Karen Morgan	7,454	22.56	(new)
Independent	Prabha Ravi	4,807	14.55	(new)
Informal votes		77	0.23	+0.14
Blank votes		349	1.06	−1.71
Turnout		33,037	41.81	+0.81
Registered electors		79,026		
Independent gain from Labour				
