= 2025 Greater Wellington Regional Council election =

Election in New Zealand

- 11 October 2025
- Turnout: 161,396 (47.58% ▲4.17 pp)
- 14 seats on the governing body of Greater Wellington Regional Council; 8 seats needed for a majority
Party	Seats	+/–
Independent	9	0
Green	2	−1
Labour	2	+1
ACT Local	1	+1
This lists parties that won seats. See the complete results below.
Control before	Control after
No majority	No majority

Chair election
- 30 October 2025

8 of 14 votes needed for majority
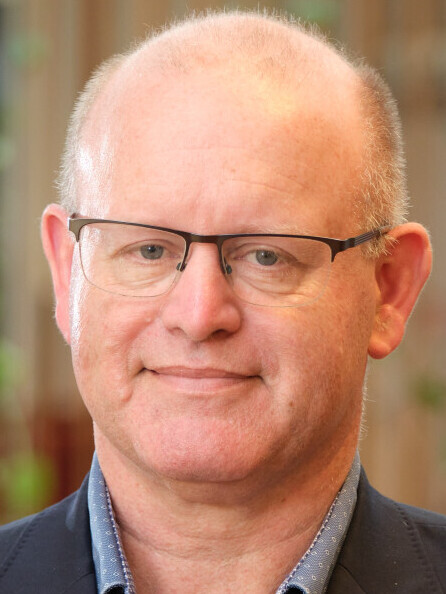
Candidate	Daran Ponter
Party	Labour
Electoral vote	Unopposed
Chair before election
Daran Ponter
Labour
Elected Chair
Daran Ponter
Labour

The 2025 Greater Wellington Regional Council election was a local election held from 9 September to 11 October in the Wellington region of New Zealand, as part of that year's regional council elections and other local elections held nation-wide. Postal voting and the single transferable vote system were used.

The Greater Wellington Regional Council makes decisions about environmental management, flood protection and land management, the provision of regional parks, public transport planning and funding, and metropolitan water supply for Greater Wellington.

The council introduced a Māori constituency for this election and, in a referendum on its future held alongside this election, as part of a nation-wide series of referendums, voters elected to keep the Māori constituency.

== Key dates ==
- 4 July 2025: Nominations for candidates opened
- 1 August 2025: Nominations for candidates closed at 12 pm
- 9 September 2025: Voting documents were posted and voting opened
- 11 October 2025: Voting closed at 12 pm and progress/preliminary results released
- 16–19 October 2025: Final results declared.

== Background ==
=== Referendum ===
In October 2023, the Greater Wellington Regional Council voted to create a Māori constituency for the 2025 & 2028 elections.

In July 2024, the National-led coalition government passed the Local Government (Electoral Legislation and Māori Wards and Māori Constituencies) Amendment Act 2024 which reinstated the requirement that councils must hold a referendum before establishing Māori wards or constituencies. The council then voted unanimously in August 2024 to affirm their decision to establish the Māori constituency, thereby triggering a referendum on the constituency to be held alongside the 2025 local elections.

== List of candidates ==
=== Incumbents not seeking re-election ===
- David Bassett, councillor for the Te Awa Kairangi ki Tai/Lower Hutt constituency
- Chris Kirk-Burnnand, councillor for the Porirua-Tawa constituency
- Ken Laban, councillor for the Te Awa Kairangi ki Tai/Lower Hutt constituency, instead sought election for mayor in Lower Hutt
- David Lee, councillor for the Pōneke/Wellington constituency, instead sought election as a councillor for the Pukehīnau/Lambton ward of the Wellington City Council
- Thomas Nash, Green Party councillor for the Pōneke/Wellington constituency

=== Te Upoko o te ika a Māui Māori constituency ===
Te Upoko o te ika a Māui Māori constituency returned one councillor to the regional council.

Candidate	Affiliation (Note: A candidate may leave their affiliation blank, run as an independent, or run with an affiliation to an organisation, local body ticket or political party. Greater Wellington Regional Council does not allow whānau, hapū, or iwi details to be used for the affiliation.)	Notes
Shamia Makarini	None	

As the only candidate, Makarini was elected unopposed to be the inaugural Te Upoko o te ika a Māui Māori constituency councillor.

=== Kāpiti Coast constituency ===
The Kāpiti Coast constituency returned one councillor to the regional council.

Candidate	Photo	Affiliation	Notes
Sam Ferguson		None	Incumbent Horizons Regional councillor. Green Party endorsed.
Penny Gaylor		None	Incumbent councillor

=== Porirua-Tawa constituency ===
The Porirua-Tawa constituency returned two councillors to the regional council.

Candidate	Photo	Affiliation	Notes
Grenville Gaskell		Independent	
Daniel Hicks		Independent	
Claire Johnstone		Independent	
Phil Rhodes		None	Land surveyor, and husband of Porirua mayor Anita Baker
Hikitia Ropata		Independent	Incumbent councillor

=== Te Awa Kairangi ki Uta/Upper Hutt constituency ===
Te Awa Kairangi ki Uta/Upper Hutt constituency returned one councillor to the regional council.

Candidate	Photo	Affiliation	Notes
Ros Connelly		None	Incumbent councillor

As the only candidate, Connelly was re-elected unopposed.

=== Te Awa Kairangi ki Tai/Lower Hutt constituency ===
Te Awa Kairangi ki Tai/Lower Hutt constituency returned three councillors to the regional council.

Candidate	Photo	Affiliation	Notes
Quentin Duthie		Green	Incumbent councillor
Nigel Elder		ACT Local	Business owner and former New Zealand Defence Force serviceman
Omar Faruque		Independent	
Mike Fisher		Independent	Former chair of the Petone community board
Tom Murphy		Independent	
Matt Shand		None	
Mike Stevenson		Independent	
Gabriel Tupou		Independent	Incumbent Hutt City councillor

=== Pōneke/Wellington constituency ===
The Pōneke/Wellington constituency returned five councillors to the regional council.

Candidate	Photo	Affiliation	Notes
Sarah Free		Independent	Incumbent Wellington city councillor for the Motukairangi/Eastern ward since 2013
Glenda Hughes		Independent Former Councillor	Former regional councillor
Alice Claire Hurdle		ACT Local	
Tom James		Labour	
Tom Kay		Independent	
Mark Kelynack		Independent	
Belinda McFadgen		None	
Henry Peach		Green	
Daran Ponter		Labour	Incumbent councillor and council chair
Yadana Saw		Green	Incumbent councillor
Simon Woolf		Independent	Incumbent councillor

=== Wairarapa constituency ===
The Wairarapa constituency returned one councillor to the regional council.

Candidate	Photo	Affiliation	Notes
Alistair Plimmer		None	Incumbent South Wairarapa District councillor
Adrienne Staples		Independent	Incumbent councillor since 2016

== Results ==
With the final results, the following candidates were declared elected:

=== Summary ===
Ward	Previous	Elected
Kāpiti Coast	Penny Gaylor	Penny Gaylor
Porirua-Tawa	Hikitia Ropata	Phil Rhodes
Porirua-Tawa	Chris Kirk-Burnnand^{R}	Claire Johnstone
Te Awa Kairangi ki Uta/Upper Hutt	Ros Connelly	Ros Connelly
Te Awa Kairangi ki Tai/Lower Hutt	Quentin Duthie	Quentin Duthie
Te Awa Kairangi ki Tai/Lower Hutt	Ken Laban^{R}	Gabiel Tupou
Te Awa Kairangi ki Tai/Lower Hutt	David Bassett^{R}	Nigel Elder
Pōneke/Wellington	Simon Woolf	Simon Woolf
Pōneke/Wellington	Daran Ponter	Daran Ponter
Pōneke/Wellington	Yadana Saw	Yadana Saw
Pōneke/Wellington	Thomas Nash^{R}	Tom James
Pōneke/Wellington	David Lee^{R}	Sarah Free
Wairarapa	Adrienne Staples	Adrienne Staples
Te Upoko o te ika a Maui Māori	new seat	Shamia Makarini
^{R} retired

=== Kāpiti Coast regional constituency ===
2025 Kāpiti Coast general constituency election
Party	Candidate	Primary votes	%	±%	Iteration	
Party	Candidate	Primary votes	%	±%	#	Votes
Independent	Penny Gaylor^{†}	9,306	48.71	−3.75	1st	9,306
Independent	Sam Ferguson	8,096	42.38	(new)	1st	8,096
Quota		8,701	45.55	−0.77		
Informal votes		22	0.12	+0.06		
Blank votes		1,680	8.79	+1.78		
Turnout		19,104	46.99	+1.41		
Registered electors		40,658				
Independent hold on 1st iteration						
^{†} incumbent

=== Porirua-Tawa regional constituency ===
2025 Porirua-Tawa general constituency election
Party	Candidate	Primary votes	%	±%	Iteration	
Party	Candidate	Primary votes	%	±%	#	Votes
Independent	Phil Rhodes	5,437	26.56	(new)	3rd	7,075
Independent	Claire Johnstone	4,184	20.44	(new)	4th	6,193
Independent	Hikitia Ropata^{†}	4,290	20.95	+1.42	4th	5,115
Independent	Grenville Gaskell	3,145	15.36	(new)	2nd	3,430
Independent	Daniel Hicks	1,470	7.18	(new)	1st	1,470
Quota		6,175	30.16	−0.84		
Informal votes		100	0.49	+0.03		
Blank votes		1,839	8.98	+2.64		
Turnout		20,474	42.40	+4.51		
Registered electors		48,286				
Independent gain from Independent on 3rd iteration						
Independent gain from Independent on 4th iteration						
^{†} incumbent

=== Te Awa Kairangi ki Uta/Upper Hutt regional constituency ===
2025 Te Awa Kairangi ki Uta/Upper Hutt general constituency election
Party	Candidate	Primary votes	%	±%	Iteration	
Party	Candidate	Primary votes	%	±%	#	Votes
Independent	Ros Connelly^{†}	elected unopposed				
Registered electors		31,023				
Independent hold on 1st iteration						
^{†} incumbent

=== Te Awa Kairangi ki Tai/Lower Hutt regional constituency ===
2025 Te Awa Kairangi ki Tai/Lower Hutt general constituency election
Party	Candidate	Primary votes	%	±%	Iteration	
Party	Candidate	Primary votes	%	±%	#	Votes
Green	Quentin Duthie^{†}	7,676	25.39	+5.13	1st	7,676
Independent	Gabriel Tupou	5,906	19.54	(new)	5th	6,956
ACT Local	Nigel Elder	5,378	17.79	(new)	9th	6,951
Independent	Mike Fisher	2,168	7.17	(new)	9th	4,537
Independent	Mike Stevenson	2,290	7.58	−0.98	8th	3,261
Independent	Matt Shand	1,258	4.16	(new)	5th	1,620
Independent	Omar Faruque	1,217	4.03	(new)	4th	1,429
Independent	Tom Murphy	1,066	3.53	(new)	2nd	1,115
Quota		6,740	22.30	−0.71		
Informal votes		880	2.91	+0.11		
Blank votes		2,377	7.86	+2.74		
Turnout		30,230	42.14	+1.16		
Registered electors		71,736				
Green hold on 1st iteration						
Independent gain from Independent on 5th iteration						
ACT Local gain from Independent on 9th iteration						
^{†} incumbent

=== Pōneke/Wellington regional constituency ===
2025 Pōneke/Wellington general constituency election
Party	Candidate	Primary votes	%	±%	Iteration	
Party	Candidate	Primary votes	%	±%	#	Votes
Independent	Simon Woolf^{†}	11,552	15.70	+1.03	2nd	11,772
Labour	Daran Ponter^{†}	11,125	15.12	+4.37	3rd	11,549
Green	Yadana Saw^{†}	10,401	14.13	−0.06	5th	13,327
Labour	Tom James	6,421	8.72	(new)	11th	11,829
Independent	Sarah Free	6,846	9.30	(new)	11th	11,160
ACT Local	Alice Claire Hurdle	6,264	8.51	(new)	11th	8,206
Independent	Tom Kay	3,941	5.35	(new)	9th	6,381
Independent	Glenda Hughes	4,512	6.13	+0.00	7th	5,063
Green	Henry Peach	4,254	5.78	(new)	4th	4,601
Independent	Belinda McFadgen	3,192	4.34	(new)	2nd	3,303
Independent	Mark Kelynack	1,297	1.76	(new)	1st	1,297
Quota		11,634	15.81	+0.29		
Informal votes		387	0.53	+0.01		
Blank votes		3,368	4.58	−1.09		
Turnout		73,596	51.04	+5.15		
Registered electors		144,191				
Independent hold on 2nd iteration						
Labour hold on 3rd iteration						
Green hold on 5th iteration						
Labour gain from Green on 11th iteration						
Independent gain from Independent on 11th iteration						
^{†} incumbent

=== Wairarapa regional constituency ===
2025 Wairarapa general constituency election
Party	Candidate	Primary votes	%	±%	Iteration	
Party	Candidate	Primary votes	%	±%	#	Votes
Independent	Adrienne Staples^{†}	8,875	48.98	n/a	1st	8,875
Independent	Alistair Plimmer	7,461	41.18	n/a	1st	7,461
Quota		8,168	45.08	n/a		
Informal votes		18	0.10	n/a		
Blank votes		1,697	9.37	n/a		
Turnout		18,118	52.75	n/a		
Registered electors		34,349				
Independent hold on 1st iteration						
^{†} incumbent

=== Te Upoko o te ika a Maui Māori regional constituency ===
2025 Te Upoko o te ika a Māui Māori constituency election
Party	Candidate	Primary votes	%	±%	Iteration	
Party	Candidate	Primary votes	%	±%	#	Votes
Independent	Shamia Makarini	elected unopposed				
Registered electors		26,194				
Independent win (new seat) on 1st iteration						

=== Māori constituency referendum ===
Referendum on Māori constituencies
Choice	Votes	%
I vote to REMOVE Māori constituencies	31,539	48.02
I vote to KEEP Māori constituencies	30,878	47.01
Informal	38	0.06
Blank	3,226	4.91
Turnout	65,681	(48.59)
Registered	135,165	
Result:	Māori constituencies to be abolished at next election.	

Māori constituency referendum results (excluding invalid votes)
Keep; 109,644 (63.5%)	Remove; 63,029 (36.5%)
▲50%

== See also ==
- 2025 Wellington City Council election
- 2025 Porirua City Council election
- 2025 Upper Hutt City Council election
- 2025 Hutt City Council election
- 2025 Kāpiti Coast District Council election
