= 2026 Greater Wellington Regional Council by-election =

By-election in Greater Wellington

2026 Greater Wellington Regional Council by-election (Wairapapa general constituency)
- 21 August 2026
- Turnout: 9,909 (28.77% ▼23.78 pp)
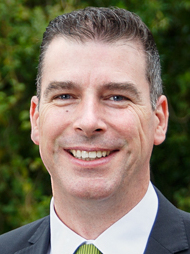
		Ind	Ind
Candidate	John Hart	Colin Olds	Alistair Plimmer
Party	Independent	Independent	Independent
Primary vote	1,989	2,064	2,097
Percentage	20.07%	20.83%	21.16%
Final vote	3,578	3,317	eliminated
Percentage	51.89%	48.11%
Councillor before election
Adrienne Staples†
Independent
Elected Councillor
John Hart
Independent

Wairarapa constituency (saturated) within Greater Wellington region

The 2026 Greater Wellington Regional Council by-election (also known as the Wairarapa by-election) was a local by-election held on 21 August 2026 in the Greater Wellington region of New Zealand. It was prompted by the death of councillor Adrienne Staples on 20 April. Voters elected one member representing the Wairarapa constituency to the Greater Wellington Regional Council. Postal voting and the single transferable vote system was used.

== Background ==
Adrienne Staples, deputy Chair of the Greater Wellington Regional Council and councillor for the Wairarapa, died on 20 April 2026. Her death triggered a by-election to fill her seat.

== Schedule ==
Key dates related to the by-election are:

- 14 May 2026: Nominations open.
- 11 June 2026: Nominations close at noon.
- 20 July 2026: Postal voting begins.
- 21 August 2026: Election day; voting closes at noon. Progress and preliminary results will be announced as soon as possible.
- 24 August 2026: Estimated date of official result declaration.

== Candidates ==
Candidates	Affiliation	Notes
Michael Birch	Independent	Farmer, businessman and environmental advocate
Amber Craig	Your voice. Our Wairarapa. Real action	
Jill Greathead	None	Former Carterton District Councillor
John Hart	None	Ran in the 2026 Masterton by-election
Colin Olds	None	Resigned from the South Wairarapa District Council in order to run
Alistair Plimmer	None	Stood in 2025 election

== Result ==
With the release of the final results, John Hart was confirmed to have been elected as the regional councillor for Wairarapa for the rest of the 2025–2028 term.

2026 Wairarapa general constituency by-election
Party	Candidate	Primary votes	%	±%	Iteration	
Party	Candidate	Primary votes	%	±%	#	Votes
Independent	John Hart	1,989	20.07	(new)	5th	3,578
Independent	Colin Olds	2,064	20.83	(new)	5th	3,317
Independent	Alistair Plimmer	2,097	21.16	−20.02	4th	2,641
Independent	Michael Birch	1,561	15.75	(new)	3rd	1,871
Independent	Jill Greathead	1,277	12.89	(new)	2nd	1,438
Independent	Amber Craig	913	9.21	(new)	1st	913
Quota		4,951	49.96	+4.88		
Informal votes		1	0.01	−0.09		
Blank votes		7	0.07	−9.30		
Turnout		9,909	28.77	−23.98		
Registered electors		34,448				
Independent gain from Independent on 5th iteration						
