= Mayor of Greytown =

The mayor of Greytown officiated over the Greytown Borough of New Zealand, which was administered by the Greytown Borough Council. The office existed from 1877 until 1989, when Greytown Borough was amalgamated into the South Wairarapa District Council as part of the 1989 local government reforms. There were 17 holders of the office. John Garrity was the last mayor of Greytown Borough served from 1983 to 1989 and would become South Wairarapa's first mayor.

== List of mayors ==
	Name	Term
1	Thomas Kempton	1879
2	J. Smith	1879–1880
3	Hart Udy, Sr	1880–1881
4	F.H. Wood	1881–1884
5	Hart Udy, Jr	1884–1885
(4)	F.H. Wood	1885–1886
(5)	Hart Udy, Jr	1886–1888
(4)	F.H. Wood	1888–1889
6	Richard Wakelin	1889–1892
(4)	F.H. Wood	1892–1893
7	J.D. Heagerty	1893–1898
8	H.S. Izard	1889–1899
(7)	J.D. Heagerty	1899–1901
(4)	F.H. Wood	1901–1903
(7)	J.D. Heagerty	1903–1904
9	A.C. Bicknell	1899–1901
10	W. Udy	1906–1907
11	D.P. Loasby	1907–1919
12	W.A. Hutton	1919–1925
13	H.T. Rees	1925–1935
14	A.W. (Mick) Horton	1935–1959
15	Fred Yule	1959–1975
16	Richard Harding	1975–1983
17	John Garrity	1983–1989
