= 2016 Greater Wellington Regional Council election =

Elections in New Zealand

← 2013	8 October 2016	2019 →
	First party	Second party
Party	Labour	Green
Last election	3	4
Seats won	5	5
Seat change	▲2	▲1
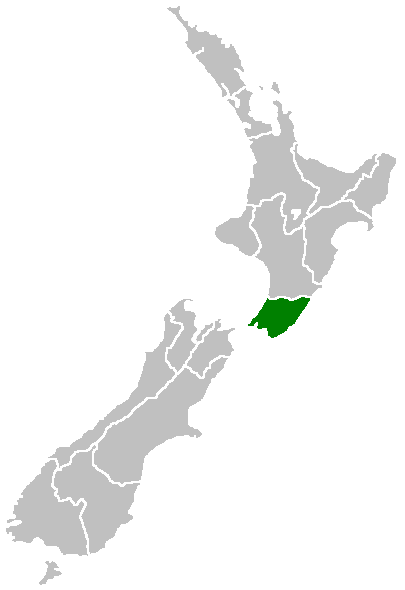
- Position of the Wellington Region

The 2016 Greater Wellington Regional Council election was a local election held from September to 8 October in the Greater Wellington region of New Zealand as part of that year's nation-wide local elections. Voters elected 12 councillors for the 2016–2019 term of the Greater Wellington Regional Council. Postal voting and the single transferable vote system were used.

== Results ==
=== Wellington constituency (5) ===
Incumbent councillor Judith Aitken did not seek re-election. Incumbents Sue Kedgley, Chris Laidlaw and Daran Ponter were re-elected, joined by former Wellington City deputy mayor Ian McKinnon and Roger Blakeley. Incumbent Paul Bruce was defeated.

Greater Wellington Regional Council election, 2016 – Wellington constituency (preliminary results)
Candidate	Affiliation	First preference		Last iteration	
Candidate	Affiliation	Votes	%	Votes	%
Sue Kedgley	Greens	11,184	20.77	8,815.05	17.32
Chris Laidlaw	Independent	9,933	18.45	8,878.60	17.44
Ian McKinnon	Independent	9,020	16.75	8,843.99	17.38
Daran Ponter	Labour	6,766	12.56	8,890.04	17.47
Roger Blakeley	Independent	5,639	10.47	8,581.70	16.86
Paul Bruce	Green	4,382	8.14	6,891.25	13.54
Russell Tregonning	Independent	3,409	6.33	—	
Keith Flinders	Independent	1,075	2.00	—	
John Klaphake	Independent	981	1.82	—	
Norbert Hausberg	Independent	796	1.48	—	
Sam Somers	Independent	664	1.23	—	
Total		53,849	100.00	50,900.63	100.00
Non-transferable votes				2,948.37	
Informal votes					
Blank votes					
Total votes cast					100.00
Turnout					

=== Lower Hutt constituency (3) ===
Incumbent councillors Ken Laban and Prue Lamason were re-elected, while David Ogden defeated incumbent councillor Sandra Greig.

Greater Wellington Regional Council election, 2016 – Lower Hutt constituency (preliminary results)
Candidate	Affiliation	First preference		Last iteration	
Candidate	Affiliation	Votes	%	Votes	%
Ken Laban	Independent	7,170	29.32	5,339.45	25.67
Prue Lamason	Independent	3,575	14.62	5,621.37	25.88
David Ogden	Independent	3,065	12.53	5,490.19	25.28
John Terris	Independent	2,927	11.97	5,031.06	23.17
Sandra Greig	Independent	2,441	9.98	—	
Derek Wilshere	Independent	2,303	9.42	—	
Leonie Dobbs		1,893	7.74	—	
Kath Allen	Team Fred Allen	1,079	4.41	—	
Total		24,453	100.00	21,746.94	100.00
Non-transferable votes				2,736.06	
Informal votes					
Blank votes					
Total votes cast					100.00
Turnout					

=== Porirua-Tawa constituency (2) ===
Incumbent councillors Jenny Brash and Barbra Donaldson were re-elected.

Greater Wellington Regional Council election, 2016 – Porirua-Tawa constituency (preliminary results)
Candidate	Affiliation	First preference		Last iteration	
Candidate	Affiliation	Votes	%	Votes	%
Jenny Brash	Independent	7,617	45.35	5,599.00	34.31
Barbara Donaldson	Independent	4,598	27.37	5,577.99	34.18
Joern Scherzer	Independent	2,675	15.93	2,941.52	13.48
Heidi Mills	Independent	1,907	11.35	2,200.28	13.48
Total		16,797	100.00	16,318.79	100.00
Non-transferable votes				478.21	
Informal votes					
Blank votes					
Total votes cast					100.00
Turnout					

=== Kapiti Coast constituency (1) ===
Retiring Kapiti Coast District Council councillor Penny Gaylor was elected, defeating incumbent councillor Nigel Wilson.

Greater Wellington Regional Council election, 2016 – Kapiti Coast constituency (preliminary results)
Candidate	Affiliation	First preference		Last iteration	
Candidate	Affiliation	Votes	%	Votes	%
Penny Gaylor	Independent	6,728	40.92	7,738	51.16
Nigel Wilson	Independent	6,701	40.76	7,388	48.84
Peter Bollmann	Independent	3,013	18.33	—	
Total		16,442	100.00	15,126	100.00
Non-transferable votes				1,316	
Informal votes					
Blank votes					
Total votes cast					100.00
Turnout					

=== Upper Hutt constituency (1) ===
Incumbent councillor Paul Swain was elected unopposed.

=== Wairarapa constituency (1) ===
The Wairarapa constituency was vacant following the death of councillor Gary McPhee in June 2016. Retiring South Wairarapa mayor Adrienne Staples was elected.

Greater Wellington Regional Council election, 2016 – Wairarapa constituency (preliminary results)
Candidate	Affiliation	First preference		Last iteration	
Candidate	Affiliation	Votes	%	Votes	%
Adrienne Staples		6,487	44.89	7,755	58.31
David Holmes	Independent	4,403	30.47	5,545	41.69
Andrew Wright		1,846	12.78	—	
Linton McGill		1,076	7.45	—	
Monique Leerschool		638	4.42	—	
Total			100.00		100.00
Non-transferable votes				1,150	
Informal votes					
Blank votes					
Total votes cast					100.00
Turnout					
