= 2022 Wellington local elections =

2022 Wellington local elections may refer to:

- 2022 Greater Wellington Regional Council election
- 2022 Wellington City Council election
