= 2025 Hutt City Council election =

Elections in New Zealand

- 11 October 2025
- Turnout: 33,037 (41.81% ▲0.81 pp)
- Mayor
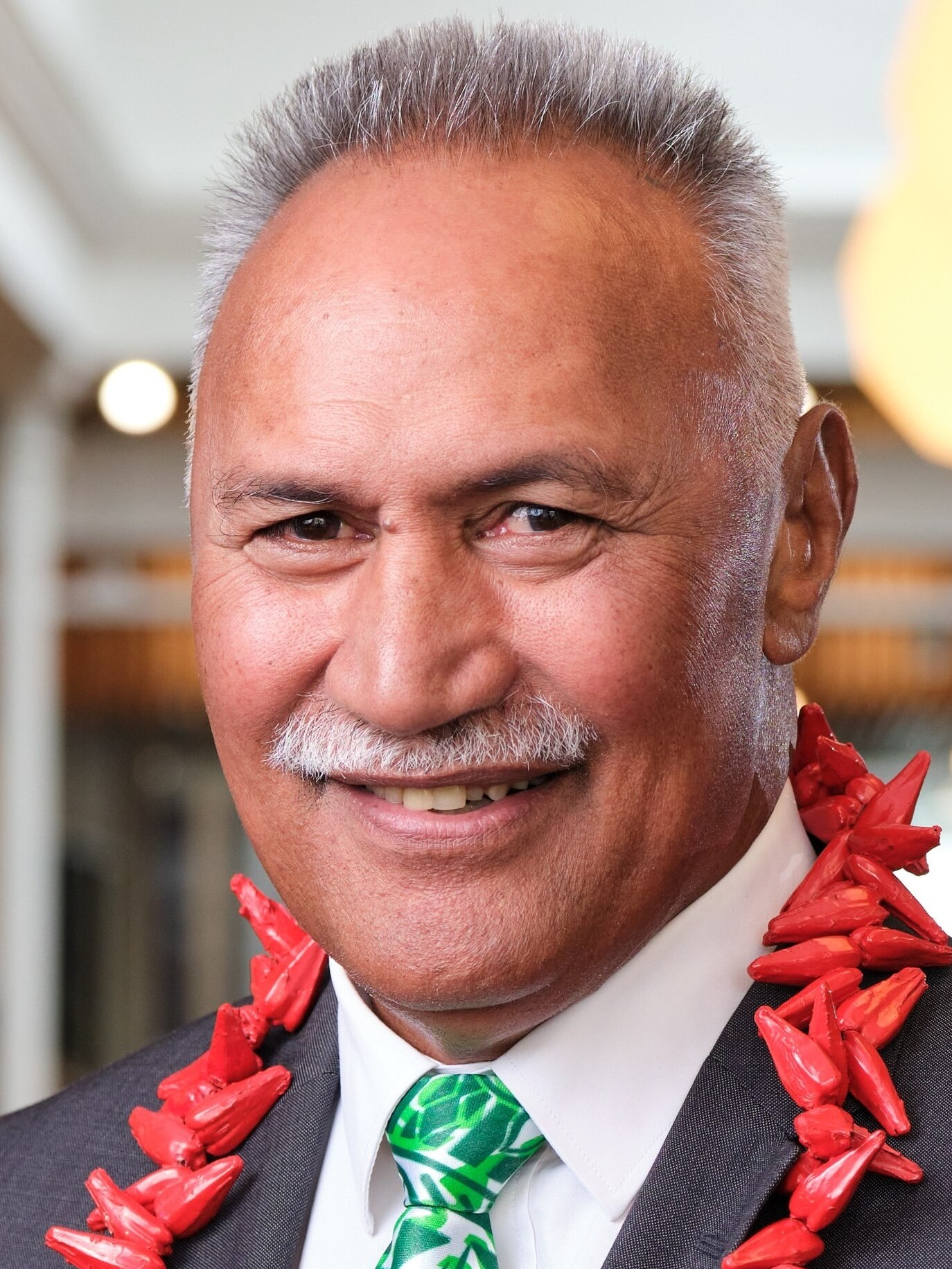

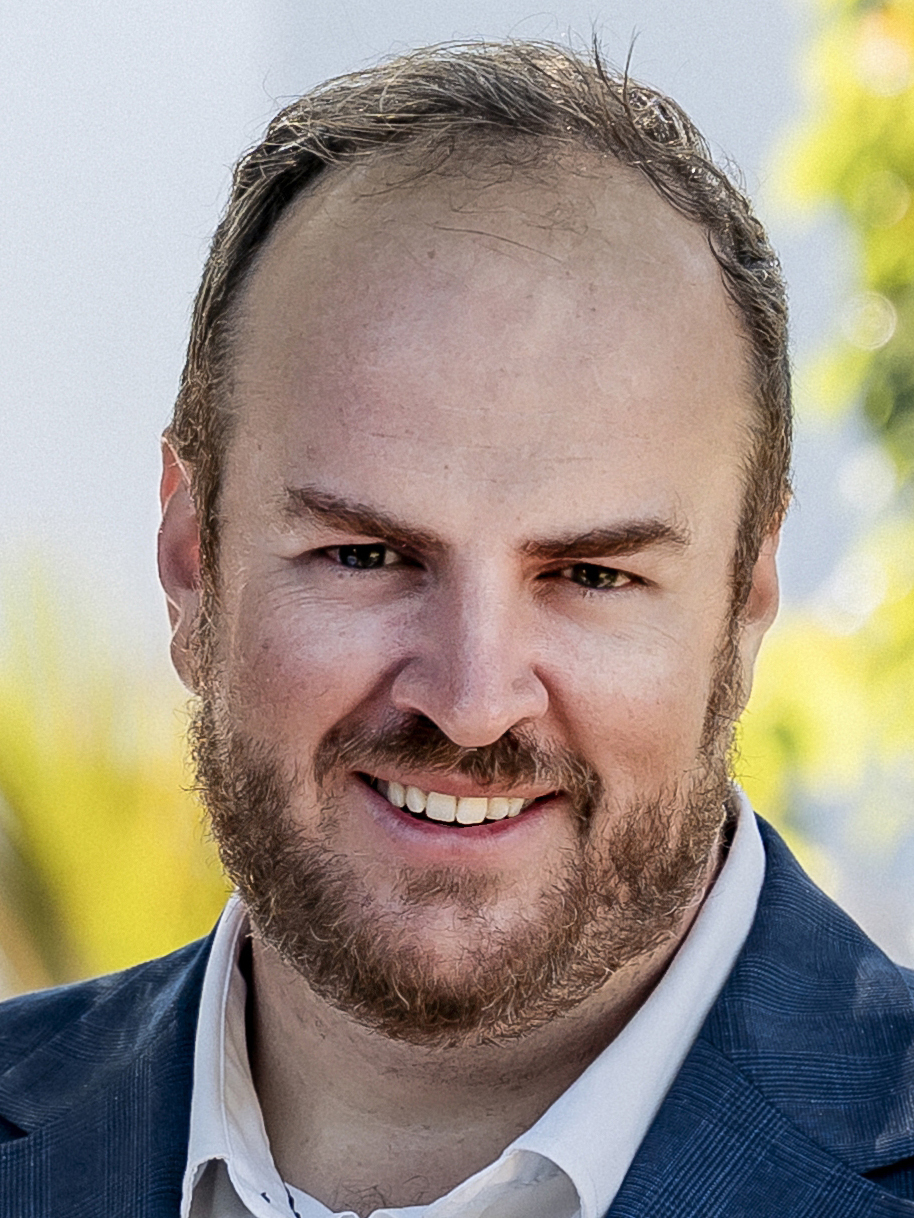
Candidate	Ken Laban	Brady Dyer
Party	Independent	Independent
Popular vote	11,282	9,068
Percentage	34.15%	27.45%
	Ind	Ind
Candidate	Karen Morgan	Prabha Ravi
Party	Independent	Independent
Popular vote	7,454	4,807
Percentage	22.56%	14.55%
Mayor before election
Campbell Barry
Labour
Elected mayor
Ken Laban
Independent
- Councillors
- 13 seats on the governing body of Hutt City Council; 7 seats needed for a majority
Party	Seats	+/–
Independent	11	+3
Labour	1	0
Independent Green	1	0
This lists parties that won seats. See the complete results below.
Control before	Control after
No majority	No majority

The 2025 Hutt City Council election was a local election held from 9 September to 11 October in Lower Hutt, New Zealand, as part of that year's territorial authority elections and other local elections held nation-wide.

Voters elected the mayor of Lower Hutt, 13 city councillors, and other local representatives for the 2025–2028 term of the Hutt City Council. Postal voting and the first-past-the-post voting system were used.

Ken Laban was elected as mayor, becoming New Zealand's first Pasifika mayor.

The council voted to introduce a Māori ward at this election; in a referendum on its future held at this election (as part of a nation-wide series of referendums) voters elected to keep the Māori ward.

A majority of voters also voted in favour of exploring amalgamation with the Wellington, Upper Hutt, Porirua and Greater Wellington councils, in an indicative poll on the issue.

== Key dates ==
- 4 July 2025: Nominations for candidates opened
- 1 August 2025: Nominations for candidates closed at 12 pm
- 9 September 2025: Voting documents were posted and voting opened
- 11 October 2025: Voting closed at 12 pm and progress/preliminary results were published
- 16–19 October 2025: Final results were declared.

== Background ==
=== Positions up for election ===
Voters in the city elected the mayor of Lower Hutt, 12 city councillors from 7 wards, and the members of two community boards (Eastbourne and Wainuiomata). They also elected several members of the Greater Wellington Regional Council. (Note: 3 members representing the city.; 1 member partially from the city in the Te Upoko o te Ika a Māui Māori constituency.)

=== Representation review ===
Following the recommendations of an independent panel, The council decided to increase the number of councillors elected from the general wards from six to seven, decrease the number of councillors elected from the at-large ward from six to five, and to disestablish the Petone, Wainuiomata and Eastbourne community boards. However, a review of these proposals by the Local Government Commission determined that the Wainuiomata and Eastbourne community boards would remain and only the Petone community board would be disestablished.

=== Māori wards referendum ===
The council voted in 2023 to establish a Māori ward for the 2025 elections.

The National-led coalition government passed legislation on Māori wards in July 2024, which reinstated the requirement that councils must hold a referendum before establishing Māori wards or constituencies; The council voted to affirm their decision to establish the Māori constituency, thereby triggering a referendum on the constituency to be held alongside the 2025 elections.

=== Amalgamation referendum ===
An indicative referendum was held alongside the election regarding potential amalgamation of the council with Wellington City Council, Upper Hutt City Council, Porirua City Council and Greater Wellington Regional Council.

== List of candidates ==
=== Incumbents not seeking re-election ===
- Campbell Barry, mayor since 2019
- Josh Briggs, councillor since 2016
- Gabriel Tupou, councillor since 2022, is instead standing for Greater Wellington Regional Council

=== Mayor ===
Incumbent mayor Campbell Barry decided not to seek re-election for a third term as mayor. Four candidates contested the position:

- Brady Dyer, incumbent councillor for the at-large ward since 2019.
- Ken Laban, Greater Wellington regional councillor for the Lower Hutt constituency since 2013 and former mayoral candidate in 2007.
- Karen Morgan, incumbent councillor for the at-large ward since 2022 and former principal of Taita College.
- Prabha Ravi, 2022 council candidate for the United Hutt ticket and founder and artistic director of Natraj School of Dance.

=== Councillors ===
==== Mana Kairangi ki Tai Māori ward ====
Mana Kairangi ki Tai Māori ward returned one councillor to the city council.

Candidate	Affiliation (Note: A candidate may leave their affiliation blank, run as an independent, or run with an affiliation to an organisation, local body ticket or political party. Hutt City Council does not allow whānau, hapū, or iwi details to be used for the affiliation.)	Notes
Te Awa Puketapu	Tangata Whenua	Incumbent chair of the Wainuiomata community board

As the only candidate, Puketapu is elected unopposed as the inaugural Mana Kairangi ki Tai Māori ward councillor.

==== Western ward ====
The Western ward returned one councillor to the city council.

Candidate	Affiliation	Notes
Chris Parkin	None	Incumbent councillor. Green endorsed.
Robbie Schneider	Independent	

==== Northern ward ====
The Northern ward returned two councillors to the city council.

Candidate	Affiliation	Notes
Andy Mitchell	Independent	Incumbent councillor for the Eastern ward
Naomi Shaw	None	Incumbent councillor

As the number of candidates did not exceed the number of positions available, Mitchell and Shaw were re-elected.

==== Central ward ====
The Central ward returned two councillors to the city council.

Candidate	Affiliation	Notes
Glenda Barratt	Independent	Incumbent councillor
Rodney Cook	None	
Simon Edwards	Independent	Incumbent councillor since 2016
Neelu Jennings	Greens	
Paki Maaka	Independent	
George Mackay	Independent	
Tim McNamara	WITHDRAWN	

==== Harbour ward ====
The Harbour ward returned one councillor to the city council.

Candidate	Affiliation	Notes
Tui Lewis	Independent	Incumbent deputy mayor

As the only candidate, Lewis was re-elected unopposed.

==== Wainuiomata ward ====
The Wainuiomata ward returned one councillor to the city council.

Candidate	Affiliation	Notes
Keri Brown	Labour	Incumbent councillor

As the only candidate, Brown was re-elected unopposed.

==== At-large ward ====
Five councillors were elected at-large to the city council.

Candidate	Affiliation	Notes
Sherry Antony	Independent	
Brady Dyer	Independent	Incumbent councillor. Also ran for mayor.
Andrew Gavriel	Independent	
Jonathon Gilbert	The Security Noticeboard	
Semi Kuresa	None	
Suzanne Levy	Independent	Member of Speak up for Women, Anti-Trans Group.
Kath McGuinness	Independent	
Chris Paul	Independent	
Prabha Ravi	Independent	Previously ran for election as a councillor for the at-large ward in 2022. Also ran for mayor.
Tony Stallinger	Independent	Incumbent councillor
Mele Tonga-Grant	None	
Karen (Kaz) Yung	Independent	Incumbent deputy chair of the Petone community board

== Results ==
Overall turnout was 41.56%, with 33,038 voting papers returned.

=== Summary ===
Ward	Previous	Elected
Mayor	Campbell Barry^{R}	Ken Laban
At-large	Brady Dyer	Brady Dyer
At-large	Josh Briggs^{R}	Prabha Ravi
At-large	Tony Stallinger	Tony Stallinger
At-large	Karen Morgan	Karen Yung
At-large	Gabiel Tupou^{R}	Mele Tonga-Grant
At-large	Simon Edwards	seat removed
Western	Chris Parkin	Chris Parkin
Harbour	Tui Lewis	Tui Lewis
Northern	Naomi Shaw	Naomi Shaw
Northern	new seat	Andy Mitchell
Eastern	Andy Mitchell	seat removed
Central	Glenda Barratt	Glenda Barratt
Central	new seat	Simon Edwards
Wainuiomata	Keri Brown	Keri Brown
Mana Kairangi ki Tai Māori	new seat	Te Awa Puketapu
^{R} retired

=== Mayor ===
Sports commentator and former councillor Fauono Ken Laban was elected mayor, becoming New Zealand's first Pasifika mayor. He won 8,704 votes to Brady Dyer's 6,974 votes, Karen Morgan's 5,529 votes, and Prabha Ravi's 3,608 votes.

2025 Lower Hutt mayoral election
Party	Candidate	Votes	%	±%
Independent	Ken Laban	11,282	34.15	(new)
Independent	Brady Dyer	9,068	27.45	(new)
Independent	Karen Morgan	7,454	22.56	(new)
Independent	Prabha Ravi	4,807	14.55	(new)
Informal votes		77	0.23	+0.14
Blank votes		349	1.06	−1.71
Turnout		33,037	41.81	+0.81
Registered electors		79,026		
Independent gain from Labour				

=== Council ===
With final results, the following candidates were declared elected:

==== At-large ward ====
2025 Lower Hutt at-large election
Party	Candidate	Votes	%	±%
Independent	Brady Dyer^{†}	19,233	58.22	+21.50
Independent	Prabha Ravi	16,753	50.71	+28.15
Independent	Tony Stallinger^{†}	15,653	47.38	+1.51
Independent	Karen (Kaz) Yung	13,449	40.71	+8.81
Independent	Mele Tonga-Grant	10,602	32.09	(new)
Independent	Kath McGuinness	10,064	30.46	(new)
Independent	Andrew Gavriel	9,744	29.49	(new)
Independent	Suzanne Levy	8,859	26.82	(new)
Independent	Semi Kuresa	8,478	25.66	(new)
Independent	Sherry Antony	8,206	24.84	(new)
Independent	Jonathon Gilbert	5,826	17.63	(new)
Independent	Chris Paul	4,425	13.39	(new)
Informal votes		127	0.38	−0.25
Blank votes		732	2.22	+0.39
Turnout		33,037	41.81	+0.81
Registered electors		79,026		
Independent hold				
Independent gain from Independent				
Independent gain from United Hutt				
Independent gain from Independent				
Independent gain from Independent				
^{†} incumbent

==== Western ward ====
2025 Western general ward election
Party	Candidate	Votes	%	±%
Independent Green	Chris Parkin^{†}	2,261	51.75	+3.67
Independent	Robbie Schneider	1,935	44.29	(new)
Informal votes		1	0.02	−0.07
Blank votes		172	3.94	−0.30
Turnout		4,369	43.49	−0.66
Registered electors		10,045		
Independent Green hold				
^{†} incumbent

==== Harbour ward ====
2025 Harbour general ward election
Party	Candidate	Votes	%	±%
Independent	Tui Lewis^{†}	elected unopposed		
Registered electors		11,392		
Independent hold				
^{†} incumbent

==== Northern ward ====
2025 Northern general ward election
Party	Candidate	Votes	%	±%
Independent	Andy Mitchell	elected unopposed		
Independent	Naomi Shaw^{†}	elected unopposed		
Registered electors		18,906		
Independent win (new seat)				
Independent hold				
^{†} incumbent

==== Central ward ====
2025 Central general ward election
Party	Candidate	Votes	%	±%
Independent	Simon Edwards	3,792	44.73	(new)
Independent	Glenda Barratt^{†}	2,307	27.21	−18.68
Independent	Paki Maaka	2,177	25.68	(new)
Independent	George Mckay	1,865	22.00	(new)
Green	Neelu Jennings	1,810	21.35	(new)
Independent	Rodney Cook	1,761	20.77	(new)
Independent	Tim McNamara	1,340	15.81	(new)
Informal votes		35	0.41	+0.20
Blank votes		358	4.22	−1.22
Turnout		8,478	43.68	−0.42
Registered electors		19,409		
Independent win (new seat)				
Independent hold				
^{†} incumbent

==== Wainuiomata ward ====
2025 Wainuiomata general ward election
Party	Candidate	Votes	%	±%
Labour	Keri Brown^{†}	elected unopposed		
Registered electors		12,032		
Labour hold				
^{†} incumbent

==== Mana Kairangi ki Tai Māori ward ====
2025 Mana Kairangi ki Tai Māori ward election
Party	Candidate	Votes	%	±%
Independent	Te Awa Puketapu	elected unopposed		
Registered electors		7,242		
Independent win (new seat)				

=== Māori ward referendum ===
Choice	Votes	%
I vote to keep the Māori ward	19,976	63.09
I vote to remove the Māori ward	11,688	36.91
Total	31,664	100.00
Valid votes	31,664	95.84
Invalid/blank votes	1,373	4.16
Total votes	33,037	100.00

Māori ward referendum results (excluding invalid votes)
Keep; 19,976 (63.1%)	Remove; 11,688 (36.9%)
▲50%

=== Amalgamation referendum ===
A majority of Lower Hutt voters voted in favour of exploring amalgamation with the Wellington, Porirua and Upper Hutt councils.

Choice	Votes	%
Yes	17,429	54.96
No	14,283	45.04
Total	31,712	100.00
Valid votes	31,712	95.99
Invalid/blank votes	1,325	4.01
Total votes	33,037	100.00

Amalgamation referendum results (excluding invalid votes)
Yes; 17,429 (55%)	No; 14,283 (45%)
▲50%

== See also ==
- 2025 Greater Wellington Regional Council election
- 2025 Upper Hutt City Council election
- 2025 Wellington City Council election
- 2025 Porirua City Council election
- 2025 Kāpiti Coast District Council election
