= 2022 Hutt City Council election =

Elections in New Zealand

← 2019	8 October 2022	2025 →
- Turnout: 32,001 (41.00%)
- Mayoral election
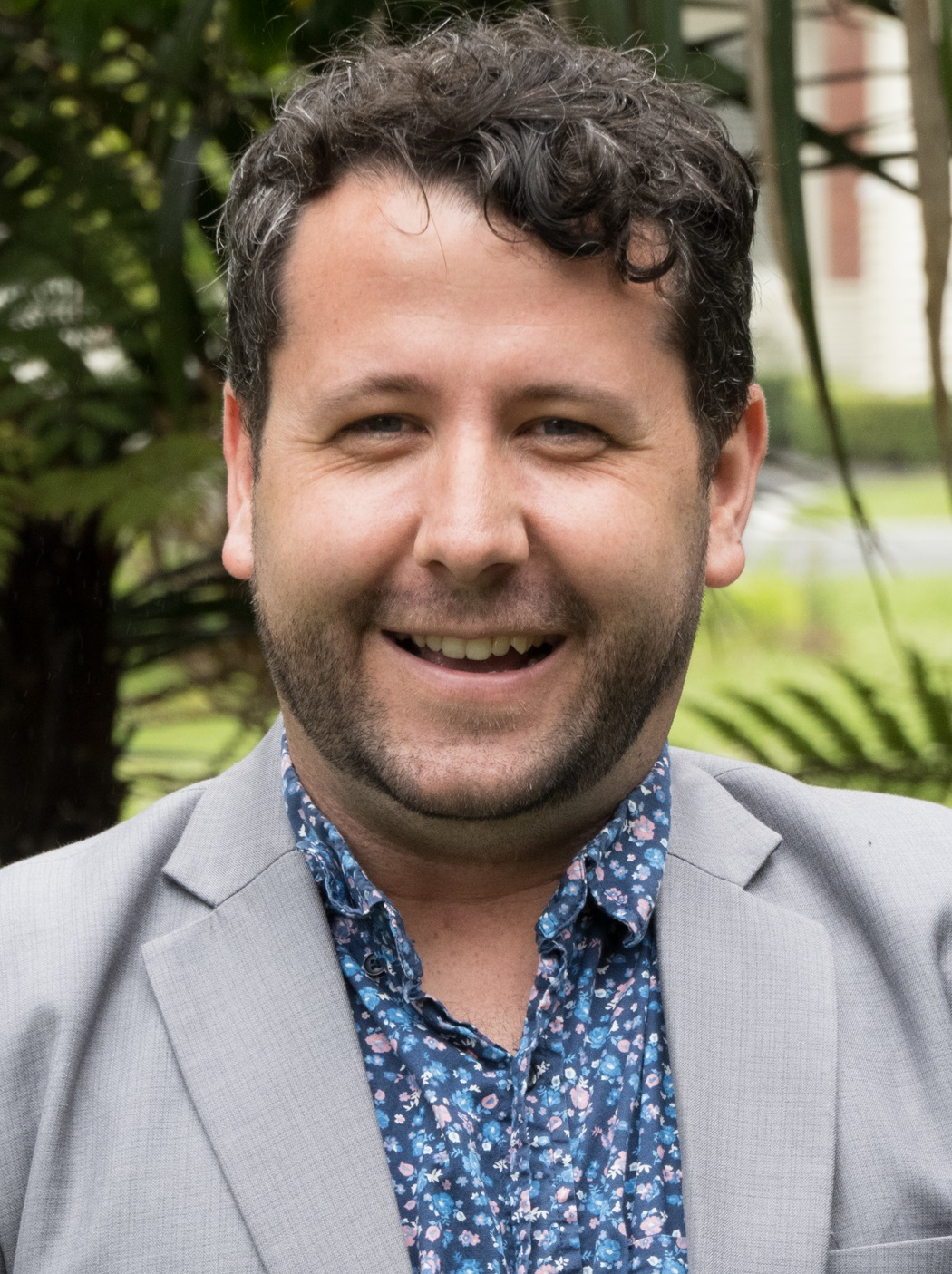

Candidate	Campbell Barry	Tony Stallinger
Affiliation	Labour	United Hutt
Popular vote	16,163	13,720
Percentage	51.94%	44.09%
Mayor before election
Campbell Barry
Labour
Elected mayor
Campbell Barry
New Zealand Labour Party
- Council election
- 12 seats on the Hutt City Council; 7 seats needed for a majority
Party	Seats	+/–
Independents	8	−3
United Hutt	2	+2
Labour	1	0
Independent Green	1	+1
This lists parties that won seats. See the complete results below.

The 2022 Hutt City Council election was a local election held from 16 September until 8 October in Lower Hutt, New Zealand as part of that year's nation-wide local elections. Voters elected the mayor of Lower Hutt and 12 city councillors for the 2022–2025 term of the Hutt City Council. Postal voting and the first-past-the-post voting system were used.

== Background ==
=== Electoral System ===
Alongside the mayor, there are six wards returning one councillor each with a further six councillors being elected at large. All officials were elected through a first-past-the-post system via postal voting.

== List of candidates ==
=== Mayor ===
The incumbent Mayor, Campbell Barry, stood for a second term. He was opposed by retailer Falgoon Patel and former Hutt City Council chief executive Tony Stallinger.

== Results ==
=== Mayor ===
2022 Lower Hutt mayoral election
Party	Candidate	Votes	%	±%
Labour	Campbell Barry	16,163	51.94	+2.66
United Hutt	Tony Stallinger	13,720	44.09	
Independent	Fangoon Patel	1,200	3.85	
Informal votes		30	0.09	−0.09
Majority		2,443	7.85	+0.14
Turnout		31,113	40.24	−2.76

=== Council ===
==== At-large ward ====
The At large ward returned six councillors to the city council.

At-large ward
Party	Candidate	Votes	%	±%
United Hutt	Tony Stallinger	14,679	53.71	
Independent	Josh Briggs	13,425	49.12	+3.42
Independent	Brady Dyer	11,752	43.00	+7.64
Independent	Karen Morgan	11,304	41.36	
Independent	Gabriel Tupou	11,183	40.92	+13.64
Independent	Simon Edwards	10,790	39.48	−4.85
Independent	Kaz Yung	10,208	37.35	+6.60
United Hutt	Jodie Winterburn	9,439	34.53	
United Hutt	Peter Fraser	9,143	33.45	
United Hutt	Rosanna von Keisenberg	7,487	27.39	
United Hutt	Prabha Ravi	7,218	26.41	
United Hutt	John Middleton	6,992	25.58	
Opportunities	Barbara Hay	5,569	20.37	
Independent	Chris Norton	5,262	19.25	−4.31
Independent	Simon Gibbs	5,162	18.88	
Independent	Mike Fisher	4,684	17.13	
Independent	Rob Macdonald	3,768	13.78	
Independent	Daniel Reurich	2,855	10.44	
Independent	Phil Stratford	2,676	9.79	
Independent	Rachel Leamy	2,654	9.71	
Independent	Mark Atkin	2,639	9.65	
Independent	Evelyn Richter	2,592	9.48	
Independent	Kari Lloyd	2,287	8.36	
Informal votes		201	0.73	
Majority		582	2.12	
Turnout		27,328	35.34	

==== Central ward ====
There Central ward returned one councillor to the city council.

Central ward
Party	Candidate	Votes	%	±%
United Hutt	Glenda Barratt	2,682	48.53	+26.53
Independent	Faran Shahzad	1,729	31.28	+17.85
Independent	Steve Hockley	1,103	19.96	
Informal votes		12	0.21	−0.55
Majority		1,579	28.57	+28.07
Turnout		5,526		

==== Eastern ward ====
The Eastern ward returned one councillor to the city council.

Eastern ward
Party	Candidate	Votes	%	±%
Independent	Andy Mitchell	2,771	61.68	+9.59
United Hutt	Dave Harle	1,462	32.54	
Independent	Jerry Gass	247	5.49	
Informal votes		12	0.26	+0.26
Majority		1,309	29.14	+24.95
Turnout		4,492		

==== Harbour ward ====
The Harbour ward returned one councillor to the city council.

Harbour ward
Party	Candidate	Votes	%	±%
Independent	Tui Lewis	4,041	66.79	+11.21
United Hutt	Petra Simm	2,002	33.09	
Informal votes		7	0.11	−0.09
Majority		2,039	33.70	+3.48
Turnout		6,050		

==== Northern ward ====
The Northern ward returned one councillor to the city council.

Northern ward
Party	Candidate	Votes	%	±%
Independent	Naomi Shaw	1,892	48.62	
United Hutt	Alice Claire Hurdle	1,419	36.46	
Independent	Ash Roper	575	14.77	
Informal votes		5	0.12	−0.01
Majority		473	12.15	
Turnout		3,891		

==== Wainuiomata ward ====
The Wainuiomata ward returned one councillors to the city council.

Wainuiomata ward
Party	Candidate	Votes	%	±%
Labour	Keri Brown	3,485	65.33	−4.58
United Hutt	Phil Galley	1,841	34.51	
Informal votes		8	0.14	+0.02
Majority		1,644	30.82	−9.13
Turnout		5,334		

==== Western ward ====
There Western ward returned one councillor to the city council. Chris Parkin was endorsed by the Green Party.

Western ward
Party	Candidate	Votes	%	±%
Green	Chris Parkin	2,632	50.20	+20.27
United Hutt	Sandra Greig	2,605	49.69	
Informal votes		5	0.09	−0.17
Majority		27	0.51	
Turnout		5,242		

=== Electoral system referendum ===
In 2021 the Hutt City Council resolved to conduct a referendum for which electoral system to use in the 2025 and 2028 local elections. The referendum asked voters to choose between the First Past the Post and Single Transferable Voting electoral systems.

Choice	Votes	%
First past the post (FPP)	19,812	69.50
Single transferable vote (STV)	8,696	30.50
Total	28,508	100.00
Valid votes	28,508	89.08
Invalid/blank votes	3,493	10.92
Total votes	32,001	100.00

== Other local elections ==
Depending on where in Lower Hutt they lived, voters also voted in concurrent local elections for the:

- Eastbourne Community Board;
- Petone Community Board;
- Wainuiomata Community Board; and/or
- Hutt Mana Charitable Trust.
