= 2022 Greater Wellington Regional Council election =

Local election in New Zealand

- 8 October 2022
- Turnout: 154,290 (43.41%)
- Chair selection

13 councillors of the Greater Wellington Regional Council 7 votes needed to win
Candidate	Daran Ponter
Affiliation	Labour
Electoral vote	unopposed
Elected Chair
Daran Ponter
Labour
- Council election
- 13 seats on the Greater Wellington Regional Council; 7 seats needed for a majority
Party	Seats	+/–
Independents	9	0
Green	3	+1
Labour	1	0
The Wellington Party	0	−1
This lists parties that won seats. See the complete results below.

The 2022 Greater Wellington Regional Council election was a local election held from 16 September until 8 October in the Greater Wellington region of New Zealand as part of that year's nation-wide local elections. Voters elected thirteen regional councillors for the 2022–2025 term of the Greater Wellington Regional Council. Postal voting and the single transferable vote system were used.

== Key dates ==
15 July	Candidate nominations opened
12 August	Candidate nominations closed at midday
16 September	Voting period starts
16 September	Voting documents given to NZ Post for delivery
8 October	Election day – voting closed at midday
14 October	Final results released

== Background ==
=== Electoral system ===
The election was held using the single transferable vote system. Thirteen councillors were elected across six constituencies.

== Results ==
=== Poneke/Wellington constituency ===
All five incumbent councillors stood for re-election. Roger Blakeley and Glenda Hughes were unsuccessful. David Lee, Thomas Nash, and Daran Ponter were re-elected. They were joined by Simon Woolfe and Yadana Saw.

2022 Greater Wellington Regional Council election: Poneke/Wellington constituency
Affiliation	Candidate	Primary vote	%	Final vote (Note: Rounded to whole number.)
Independent	Simon Woolfe	10,061	14.67	9,804
Green	Yadana Saw	9,734	14.19	9,807
Green	Thomas Nash	9,396	13.70	9,808
Labour	Daran Ponter	7,373	10.75	9,806
Independent	David Lee	5,458	7.96	9,804
Independent	Roger Blakeley	6,375	9.3	9,782
Independent	Glenda Hughes	4,206	6.13	0
Independent	Jake Arthur	4,206	6.13	0
Independent	Chris Calvi-Freeman	3,611	5.27	0
Independent	Chris Montgomerie	1,428	2.08	0
Independent	Thomas Bryan	1,320	1.92	0
Independent	Leigh Catley	1,270	1.85	0
Informal		358	0.52	
Blank		3,888	5.67	
Turnout		68,575	45.89	
Registered		149,422		
Independent gain from The Wellington Party				
Green gain from Independent				
Green hold				
Labour hold				
Independent hold				

=== Te Awa Kairangi ki Tai/Lower Hutt constituency ===
2022 Greater Wellington Regional Council election: Te Awa Kairangi ki Tai/Lower Hutt constituency
Affiliation	Candidate	Primary vote	%	Final vote
Independent	David Bassett	7,119	22.26	7,405
Independent	Ken Laban	7,086	22.16	7,327
Green	Quentin Duthie	6,477	20.26	7,282
Labour	Alex Voutratzis	3,259	10.19	3,639
Independent	Michael Stevenson	2,736	8.56	3,313
Independent	Peggy Luke-Ngaheke	1,514	4.74	0
Independent	Tracey Buick	1,241	3.88	0
Informal		895	2.8	
Blank		1,637	5.12	
Turnout		31,974	40.98	
Registered		78,030		
Independent gain from Independent				
Independent hold				
Green hold				

=== Porirua-Tawa constituency ===
2022 Greater Wellington Regional Council election: Porirua-Tawa constituency
Affiliation	Candidate	Primary vote	%	Final vote
Independent	Chris Kirk-Burnnand	5,527	27.65	5,867
Independent	Hikitia Ropata	3,903	19.53	5,925
Independent	Roger Watkin	4,215	21.09	5,575
Green	Robyn Smith	3,852	19.27	0
Independent	Lynette Itani	1,092	5.46	0
Informal		187	0.94	
Blank		2,204	11.03	
Turnout		19,986	37.89	
Registered		52,749		
Independent gain from Independent				
Independent gain from Independent				

=== Kāpiti Coast constituency ===
2022 Greater Wellington Regional Council election: Kāpiti Coast constituency
Affiliation	Candidate	Vote	%
Independent	Penny Gaylor	10,216	52.46
Independent Green	Asher Wilson-Goldman	7,824	40.18
Informal		12	0.06
Blank		1,366	7.01
Turnout		19,474	45.58
Registered		42,721	
Independent hold			

=== Wairarapa constituency ===
2022 Greater Wellington Regional Council election: Wairarapa constituency
Affiliation	Candidate	Vote
Independent	Adrienne Staples	Unopposed
Registered		42,721
Independent hold		

=== Te Awa Kairangi ki Uta/Upper Hutt constituency ===
2022 Greater Wellington Regional Council election: Te Awa Kairangi ki Uta/Upper Hutt constituency
Affiliation	Candidate	Vote	%
Independent	Ros Connelly	7,376	51.65
Independent	Steve Taylor	4,321	30.26
Independent	Peter Hayes	1,453.	10.17
Informal		23	0.16
Blank		1,072	7.51
Turnout		14,281	43.93
Registered		32,510	
Independent hold			

== Chair selection ==
Daran Ponter, a Labour councillor, was elected as chair unopposed.
