= 2025 Kāpiti Coast District Council election =

Elections in New Zealand

- 11 October 2025
- Turnout: 20,481 (46.91% ▲1.14 pp)
- Mayor
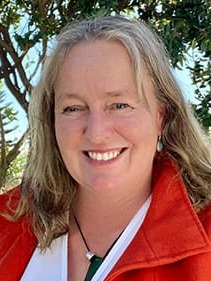
		Ind	Ind
Candidate	Janet Holborow	Rob McCann	Liz Koh
Party	Independent politician	Independent politician	Independent politician
Primary vote	6,721	4,744	3,027
Percentage	32.82%	23.16%	14.78%
Final vote	8,676	7,606	excluded
Percentage	53.29%	46.71%
	WLK	Ind	Ind
Candidate	Dean Harris	Martin Halliday	Kim Hobson
Party	We Love Kāpiti	Independent politician	Independent politician
Primary vote	2,291	1,976	1,345
Percentage	11.19%	9.65%	6.57%
Final vote	excluded	excluded	excluded
Mayor before election
Janet Holborow
Independent politician
Elected mayor
Janet Holborow
Independent politician
- Councillors
- 10 seats on the governing body of Kāpiti Coast District Council; 6 seats needed for a majority
Party	Seats	+/–
Independent	9	−1
Te Pāti Māori	1	+1
This lists parties that won seats. See the complete results below.
Control before	Control after
No majority	No majority

The 2025 Kāpiti Coast District Council election was a local election held from 9 September to 11 October in the Kāpiti Coast District of New Zealand, as part of that year's territorial authority elections and other local elections held nation-wide.

Voters elected the mayor of Kāpiti Coast, 10 district councillors, and other local representatives for the 2025–2028 term of the Kāpiti Coast District Council. Postal voting and the single transferable vote system were used.

Incumbent mayor Janet Holborow won re-election to a second term.

The council voted to introduce a Māori ward for this election; in a referendum on its future held at this election (as part of a nation-wide series of referendums) voters elected to keep the Māori ward.

== Key dates ==
- 4 July 2025: Nominations for candidates opened
- 1 August 2025: Nominations for candidates closed at 12 pm
- 9 September 2025: Voting documents were posted and voting opened
- 11 October 2025: Voting closed at 12 pm and progress/preliminary results were published
- 16–19 October 2025: Final results were declared.

== Background ==
=== Positions up for election ===
Voters in the district elected the mayor of Kāpiti Coast, 10 district councillors in 6 wards, and the members of 5 community boards (Ōtaki, Waikanae, Paraparaumu, Raumati, and Paekākāriki).

They also elected several members of the Greater Wellington Regional Council. (Note: 1 member from the district in the Kāpiti Coast general constituency.; 1 member partially from the district in the Te Upoko o te Ika a Māui Māori constituency.)

== List of candidates ==
=== Incumbents not seeking re-election ===
- Sophie Handford, councillor for the Paekākāriki-Raumati ward since 2019
- Kathy Spiers, incumbent councillor for the Paraparaumu ward, instead ran for the Paraparaumu Community Board

=== Mayor ===
Candidate	Affiliation (Note: A candidate may leave their affiliation blank, run as an independent, or run with an affiliation to an organisation, local body ticket or political party. Kāpiti Coast District Council does not allow election slogans to be used for the affiliation.)	Notes
Martin Halliday	Independent	Incumbent councillor for the Paraparaumu ward. Also ran for re-election as a councillor.
Dean Harris	We Love Kāpiti	Also ran to be a councillor for the Waikanae general ward
Kim Hobson	Independent	
Janet Holborow	Independent	Incumbent mayor since 2022
Liz Koh	Independent	Councillor for the at-large ward since 2022. Also ran as a councillor.
Rob McCann	None	Also ran to be a councillor for the at-large ward

=== Councillors ===
==== Kapiti Coast Māori ward ====
The Kapiti Coast Māori ward returned one councillor to the district council.

Candidate	Affiliation	Notes
Himiona Grace	Te Pāti Māori	
Rangi Halberd	None	
Jason Thurston	New Zealand Māori Council and Paraparaumu Māori Committee	
Brain Ruawai-Hamilton	We Love Kāpiti	
Deanna Rudd	None	
Jordon Wansbrough	None	

==== Ōtaki general ward ====
The Ōtaki general ward returned one councillor to the district council.

Candidate	Affiliation	Notes
Heniti Buick	None	Chief executive of Te Puna Oranga o Ōtaki
Cam Butler	Independent	Incumbent Ōtaki Community Board chair
Brent Frogley	We Love Kāpiti	
Rob Kofoed	None	Incumbent councillor for the at-large ward
Shelly Warwick	Independent	Incumbent councillor

==== Waikanae general ward ====
The Waikanae general ward returned two councillors to the district council.

Candidate	Affiliation	Notes
Peter Bollman	Independent	
Steven Botica	None	
Phil Byrne	Independent	
Martin Frauenstein	We Love Kāpiti	
Dean Harris	We Love Kāpiti	Also ran for mayor
Chris Maclean	Independent	
Michael Moore	None	
Jocelyn Prvanov	Independent	Incumbent councillor
Nigel Wilson	None	Incumbent councillor

==== Paraparaumu general ward ====
The Paraparaumu general ward returned three councillors to the district council.

Candidate	Affiliation	Notes
Paul Baggott	Independent	
Glen Cooper	Independent	Incumbent councillor
David Freeman	None	
Martin Halliday	Independent	Incumbent councillor. Also ran for mayor.
Chris Harwood	We Love Kāpiti	
Murray Lobb	None	
Euon Murrell	Independent	
Glen Olsen	Independent	
Bernie Randall	Independent	
Mark Souness	Independent	
Fiona Vining	None	

==== Paekākāriki-Raumati general ward ====
The Paekākāriki-Raumati general ward returned one councillor to the district council.

Candidate	Affiliation	Notes
Zelda Edwards	None	
Bede Laracy	Independent	Chair of the Raumati Community Board
Richard Young	Independent	Previously ran for council in 2022

==== At-large ward ====
Two councillors were elected at-large to the district council.

Candidate	Affiliation	Notes
Grant Bartlett	Independent	
Jackie Elliott	Independent	Incumbent Ōtaki community board member
Lawrence Kirby	Independent	Incumbent deputy mayor since 2022
Liz Koh	Independent	Incumbent councillor since 2022. Also ran for mayor.
Rob McCann	None	Also ran for mayor
Jo Turner	Independent	
Joanne Welch	We Love Kāpiti	
Gavin Welsh	Independent	
Marek Willis	None	

== Results ==
Overall turnout was 46.9%, with 20,491 voting papers returned, an increase of 1.1% from the 2022 elections.

With the final results, the following candidates were elected:

=== Summary ===
Ward	Previous	Elected
Mayor	Janet Holborow	Janet Holborow
Districtwide	Lawrence Kirby	Rob McCann
Districtwide	Liz Koh	Liz Koh
Districtwide	Rob Kofoed	seat removed
Kāpiti Coast Māori	new seat	Himiona Nehua Grace
Ōtaki	Shelly Warwick	Heniti Buick
Paekākāriki-Raumati	Sophie Handford^{R}	Bede John Laracy
Paraparaumu	Martin Halliday	Martin Halliday
Paraparaumu	Glen Cooper	Glen Cooper
Paraparaumu	Kathy Spiers^{R}	Glen Olsen
Waikanae	Nigel Wilson	Steve Botica
Waikanae	Jocelyn Prvanov	Jocelyn Prvanov
^{R} retired

=== Mayor ===
Incumbent mayor Janet Holborow won re-election to a second term, with Rob McCann coming in second-place.

2025 Kāpiti Coast mayoral election
Party	Candidate	Primary votes	%	±%	Iteration	
Party	Candidate	Primary votes	%	±%	#	Votes
Independent	Janet Holborow^{†}	6,721	32.82	+4.73	5th	8,676
Independent	Rob McCann	4,744	23.16	−0.10	5th	7,606
Independent	Liz Koh	3,027	14.78	(new)	4th	3,910
We Love Kāpiti	Dean Harris	2,291	11.19	(new)	3rd	2,649
Independent	Martin Halliday	1,976	9.65	−5.28	2nd	2,154
Independent	Kim Hobson	1,345	6.57	(new)	1st	1,345
Quota		10,052	49.08	−0.29		
Informal votes		27	0.13	−0.11		
Blank votes		350	1.71	+0.59		
Turnout		20,481	46.91	+1.14		
Registered electors		43,664				
Independent hold on 5th iteration						
^{†} incumbent

=== District-wide ward ===
2025 Kāpiti Coast district-wide ward election
Party	Candidate	Primary votes	%	±%	Iteration	
Party	Candidate	Primary votes	%	±%	#	Votes
Independent	Rob McCann	4,449	21.72	(new)	7th	6,273
Independent	Liz Koh^{†}	4,209	20.55	−0.64	8th	5,773
Independent	Lawrence Paul Kirby^{†}	4,053	19.79	+7.91	8th	5,353
We Love Kāpiti	Joanne Welch	2,186	10.67	(new)	6th	2,804
Independent	Gavin Welsh	1,568	7.66	(new)	5th	2,016
Independent	Jackie Elliott	1,308	6.39	−2.98	4th	1,545
Independent	Jo Turner	851	4.16	(new)	3rd	952
Independent	Grant Bartlett	531	2.59	(new)	2nd	548
Independent	Marek Willis	437	2.13	(new)	1st	437
Quota		6,531	31.89	+8.18		
Informal votes		147	0.72	−0.15		
Blank votes		742	3.62	+0.29		
Turnout		20,481	46.91	+1.14		
Registered electors		43,664				
Independent gain from Independent on 7th iteration						
Independent hold on 8th iteration						
^{†} incumbent

=== Ōtaki general ward ===
2025 Ōtaki general ward election
Party	Candidate	Primary votes	%	±%	Iteration	
Party	Candidate	Primary votes	%	±%	#	Votes
Independent	Heniti Buick	973	34.47	(new)	4th	1,369
Independent	Rob Kofoed	557	19.73	(new)	4th	937
Independent	Cam Butler	494	17.50	(new)	3rd	665
Independent	Shelly Warwick^{†}	465	16.47	−39.88	2nd	496
We Love Kāpiti	Brent Frogley	300	10.63	(new)	1st	300
Quota		1,395	49.42	+1.17		
Informal votes		2	0.07	−0.05		
Blank votes		32	1.13	−2.25		
Turnout		2,823	50.28	+11.12		
Registered electors		5,615				
Independent gain from Independent on 4th iteration						
^{†} incumbent

=== Paekākāriki-Raumati general ward ===
2025 Paekākāriki-Raumato general ward election
Party	Candidate	Primary votes	%	±%	Iteration	
Party	Candidate	Primary votes	%	±%	#	Votes
Independent	Bede John Laracy	1,438	48.42	(new)	1st	1,438
Independent	Zelda Emmeline Edwards	842	28.35	(new)	1st	842
Independent	Richard Young	570	19.19	−9.94	1st	570
Quota		1,425	47.98	+0.02		
Informal votes		2	0.07	−0.03		
Blank votes		118	3.97	−0.01		
Turnout		2,970	48.90	+0.97		
Registered electors		6,073				
Independent gain from Independent on 1st iteration						

=== Paraparaumu general ward ===
2025 Paraparaumu general ward election
Party	Candidate	Primary votes	%	±%	Iteration	
Party	Candidate	Primary votes	%	±%	#	Votes
Independent	Martin Halliday^{†}	1,353	18.68	−3.29	7th	1,750
Independent	Glen Cooper^{†}	1,229	16.97	−3.19	7th	1,632
Independent	Glen Olsen	730	10.08	(new)	11th	1,516
Independent	Fiona Vining	738	10.19	(new)	11th	1,348
We Love Kāpiti	Chris Harwood	693	9.57	(new)	8th	939
Independent	Euon Murrell	593	8.19	(new)	6th	778
Independent	Paul Baggott	537	7.41	(new)	5th	627
Independent	Bernie Randall	351	4.85	−3.93	4th	398
Independent	Murray Lobb	330	4.56	−8.14	3rd	362
Independent	Dave Freeman	272	3.76	(new)	2nd	278
Independent	Mark Robert Souness	66	0.91	(new)	1st	66
Quota		1,723	23.79	−0.07		
Informal votes		45	0.62	−0.10		
Blank votes		306	4.22	+0.11		
Turnout		7,243	42.82	−0.46		
Registered electors		16,914				
Independent hold on 7th iteration						
Independent hold on 7th iteration						
Independent gain from Independent on 11th iteration						
^{†} incumbent

=== Waikanae general ward ===
2025 Waikanae general ward election
Party	Candidate	Primary votes	%	±%	Iteration	
Party	Candidate	Primary votes	%	±%	#	Votes
Independent	Steven Botica	1,079	17.12	(new)	7th	1,710
Independent	Jocelyn Louise Prvanov^{†}	1,071	17.00	−14.68	7th	1,773
Independent	Nigel Wilson^{†}	872	13.84	−15.33	7th	1,502
Independent	Michael Moore	669	10.62	(new)	6th	978
We Love Kāpiti	Dean Harris	601	9.54	(new)	5th	876
Independent	Chris MacLean	607	9.63	(new)	4th	760
Independent	Phil Byrne	490	7.78	(new)	3rd	579
Independent	Peter Bollmann	398	6.32	(new)	2nd	408
We Love Kāpiti	Martin Frauenstein	257	4.08	(new)	1st	257
Quota		2,015	31.98	+0.42		
Informal votes		55	0.87	+0.46		
Blank votes		202	3.21	−1.85		
Turnout		6,301	51.12	−0.69		
Registered electors		12,326				
Independent gain from Independent on 7th iteration						
Independent hold on 7th iteration						
^{†} incumbent

=== Kāpiti Coast Māori ward ===
2025 Kāpiti Coast Māori ward election
Party	Candidate	Primary votes	%	±%	Iteration	
Party	Candidate	Primary votes	%	±%	#	Votes
Te Pāti Māori	Himiona Nehua Grace	418	36.54	(new)	5th	514
Independent	Deanne Rudd	432	37.76	(new)	5th	507
Independent	Rangi Halbert	99	8.65	(new)	4th	127
We Love Kāpiti	Brian Ruawai-Hamilton	75	6.56	(new)	3rd	81
Independent	Jason Thurston	60	5.24	(new)	2nd	62
Independent	Jordon Wansbrough	33	2.88	(new)	1st	33
Quota		559	48.86	n/a		
Informal votes		6	0.52	n/a		
Blank votes		21	1.84	n/a		
Turnout		1,144	41.81	n/a		
Registered electors		2,736				
Te Pāti Māori win (new seat) on 5th iteration						

=== Māori ward referendum ===
Choice	Votes	%
I vote to keep the Māori ward	10,790	57.57
I vote to remove the Māori ward	7,952	42.43
Total	18,742	100.00
Valid votes	18,742	91.51
Invalid/blank votes	1,739	8.49
Total votes	20,481	100.00

Māori ward referendum results (excluding invalid votes)
Keep; 10,790 (57.6%)	Remove; 7,952 (42.4%)
▲50%

== See also ==
- 2025 Greater Wellington Regional Council election
- 2025 Porirua City Council election
- 2025 Wellington City Council election
- 2025 Hutt City Council election
- 2025 Upper Hutt City Council election
