= Mayor of South Wairarapa =

Head of New Zealand district government

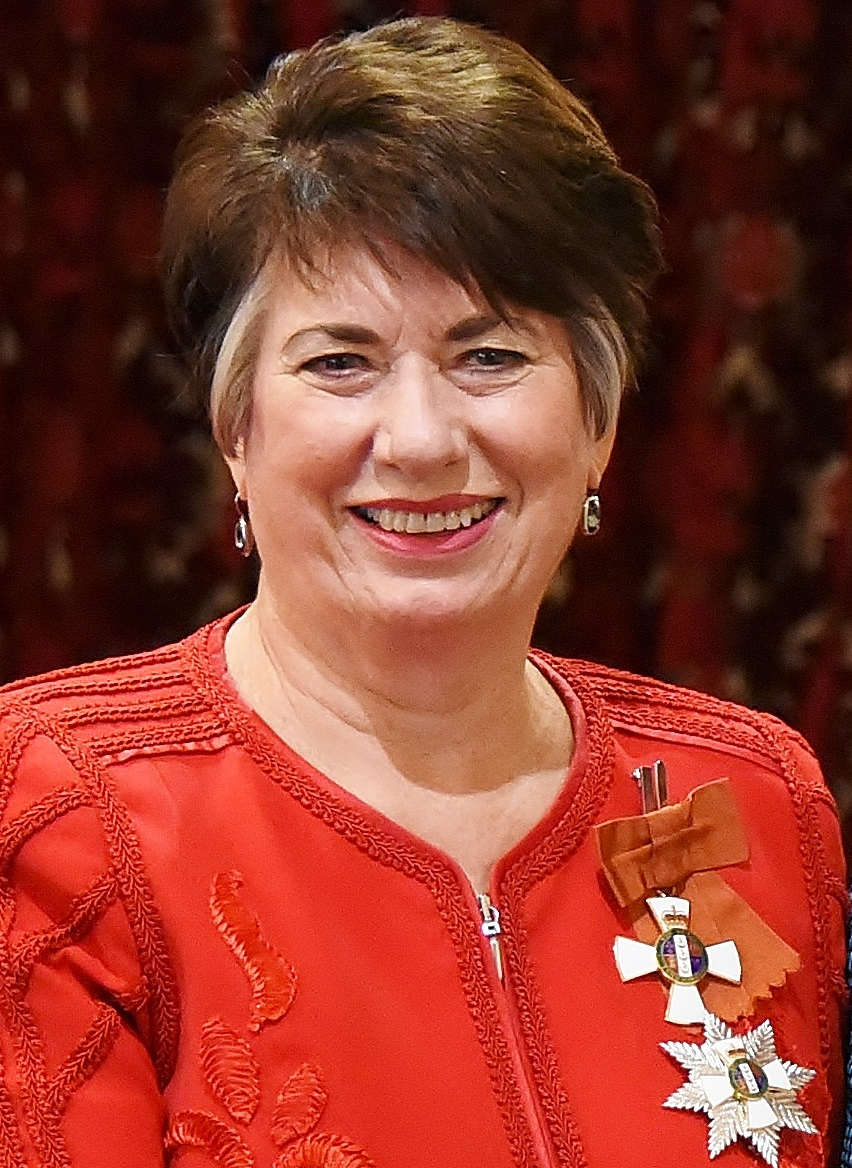
- Incumbent; Fran Wilde since 2025
- Style: His/Her Worship
- Term length: Three years
- Inaugural holder: John Garrity
- Formation: 1989
- Deputy: Rob Taylor
- Salary: $105,157
- Website: Official website

The mayor of South Wairarapa officiates over the South Wairarapa District Council. The office has existed since the 1989 local government reforms, when the Featherston County, Greytown Borough, Featherston Borough and Martinborough Borough were amalgamated.

The current mayor is Fran Wilde who was elected in 2025.

== List of mayors ==
	Name	Portrait	Term
1	John Garrity		1989–1995
2	John Read		1995–2004
3	Adrienne Staples		2004–2016
4	Viv Napier		2016–2019
5	Alex Beijen		2019–2022
6	Martin Connelly		2022–2025
7	Fran Wilde		2025–present

== List of deputy mayors ==
Name	Term	Mayor
John Read	1989–?	Garrity
Max Stevens	1992–1995	Garrity
Mike Gray	1995–2004	Read
Viv Napier	2004–2016	Staples
Brian Jephson	2016–2019	Napier
Garrick Emms	2019–2022	Beijen
Melissa Sadler-Futter	2022–2025	Connelly
Rob Taylor	2025–present	Wilde
