= Greater Wellington Regional Council =

Regional council in New Zealand

Greater Wellington Regional Council Te Pane Matua Taiao

Type
- Type: Regional council of Greater Wellington

History
- Founded: 1980/1989

Leadership
- Chair: Daran Ponter, Labour
- Deputy Chair: Ros Connelly
- Chief Executive Officer: Nigel Corry

Structure
- Seats: 14
- Political groups: Independent (9); Labour (2); Green (2); ACT Local (1)

Elections
- Voting system: STV
- Last election: 11 October 2025
- Next election: 2028

Meeting place
- 100 Cuba Street, Te Aro, Wellington; 1056 Fergusson Drive, Upper Hutt; 34 Chapel Street, Masterton

Website
- gw.govt.nz

Wellington Regional Council, branded as Greater Wellington Regional Council (GWRC), is the regional council overseeing the Wellington Region of New Zealand's lower North Island. It is responsible for public transport under the brand Metlink, environmental and flood protection, and the region's water supply. As of 2023, it is the majority owner of CentrePort Wellington with a 77% shareholding.

The Wellington Regional Council was first formed in 1980 from the amalgamation of the functions of the Wellington Regional Planning Authority with those of the Wellington Regional Water Board, before taking its current form with the local government reforms of 1989. The council adopted the promotional name "Greater Wellington" in 2003.

A proposal made in 2013 that nine territorial authorities amalgamate to form a single supercity met substantial local opposition and was abandoned in June 2015.

== Council members ==
The governing body of the regional council is made up of 14 councillors, representing six constituencies:

- Pōneke/Wellington – 5 councillors
- Kāpiti Coast – 1
- Porirua-Tawa – 2
- Te Awa Kairangi ki Tai/Lower Hutt – 3
- Te Awa Kairangi ki Uta/Upper Hutt – 1
- Wairarapa – 1
- Te Upoko o te ika a Māui Māori constituency – 1

The Te Upoko o te ika a Māui Māori constituency was established for the 2025 local body elections by council vote in October 2023.

The most recent elections to the council took place in October 2025.

Wairarapa councillor and deputy chair Adrienne Staples died on 20 April 2026, meaning that a by-election was held in the Wairarapa constituency to fill her seat. Voting opened on 20 July and closed on 21 August. The by-election was won by independent candidate John Hart.

As of August 2026, the regional councillors are:

Key

Labour Green Independent ACT Local

Name	Portrait	Position	Constituency
Daran Ponter		Chairperson	Pōneke/Wellington
Ros Connelly		Deputy Chairperson after 19 May 2026	Te Awa Kairangi ki Uta/Upper Hutt
John Hart		Councillor	Wairarapa
Simon Woolf		Councillor	Pōneke/Wellington
Yadana Saw		Councillor	Pōneke/Wellington
Tom James		Councillor	Pōneke/Wellington
Sarah Free		Councillor	Pōneke/Wellington
Gabriel Tupou		Councillor	Te Awa Kairangi ki Tai/Lower Hutt
Nigel Elder		Councillor	Te Awa Kairangi ki Tai/Lower Hutt
Quentin Duthie		Councillor	Te Awa Kairangi ki Tai/Lower Hutt
Phil Rhodes		Councillor	Porirua-Tawa
Claire Johnstone		Councillor	Porirua-Tawa
Penny Gaylor		Councillor	Kāpiti Coast
Shamia Makarini		Councillor	Te Upoko o te ika a Māui

== Chairs ==
No.	Name	Portrait	Term		Constituency
1	Mervyn Kemp		1980	1986	Tawa
2	Stuart Macaskill		1986	2001	Upper Hutt
3	Margaret Shields		2001	2004	Porirua
4	Ian Buchanan		2004	2007	Wairarapa
5	Fran Wilde		2007	2015	Wellington City
6	Chris Laidlaw		2015	2019	Wellington City
7	Daran Ponter		2019	present	Wellington City

== Deputy chairs ==
^{†} Died in office

Name	Portrait	Term		Constituency	Chair
Keith Spry		?	1989	Wellington City	Macaskill
Ken Gray		1989	1992^{[†]}	Porirua	Macaskill
Alison Lawson		1992	1995	Lower Hutt	Macaskill
Euan McQueen		1995	1998	Wellington North	Macaskill
Margaret Shields		1998	2001	Porirua	Macaskill
Terry McDavitt		2001	2007	Wellington City	Shields
Terry McDavitt		2001	2007	Wellington City	Buchanan
Peter Glensor		2007	2013	Lower Hutt	Wilde
Barbara Donaldson		2013	2019	Porirua-Tawa	Wilde
Barbara Donaldson		2013	2019	Porirua-Tawa	Laidlaw
Adrienne Staples		2019	2026^{[†]}	Wairarapa	Ponter
Position vacant (20 April – 19 May 2026)					Ponter
Ros Connelly		2026	present	Te Awa Kairangi ki Uta/Upper Hutt	Ponter

== Regional parks ==
The council administers several regional parks.

- Akatarawa Forest
- Baring Head/Orua-pouanui
- Battle Hill Farm Forest Park
- Belmont Regional Park
- East Harbour Regional Park
- Hutt River Trail
- Hutt Water Collection Area
- Kaitoke Regional Park
- Pakuratahi Forest
- Queen Elizabeth Park
- Te Awarua-o-Porirua Harbour
- Wainuiomata Recreation Area
- Wainuiomata Water Collection Area
- Wairarapa Moana Wetlands
- Wellington Harbour
- Whitireia Park

== Elections ==
- 1989
- 1992
- 1995
- 1998
- 2001
- 2004
- 2007
- 2010
- 2013
- 2016
- 2019
- 2022
- 2025
- (2026)

== See also ==
- Manawatū-Whanganui Regional council – neighbouring regional council
- Territorial authorities within the Greater Wellington region:
  - Wellington City Council
  - Porirua City Council
  - Hutt City Council
  - Upper Hutt City Council
  - Kāpiti Coast District Council
  - South Wairarapa District Council
  - Carterton District Council
  - Masterton District Council
