= Adrienne Staples =

New Zealand politician (1956–2026)

Adrienne Staples ONZM
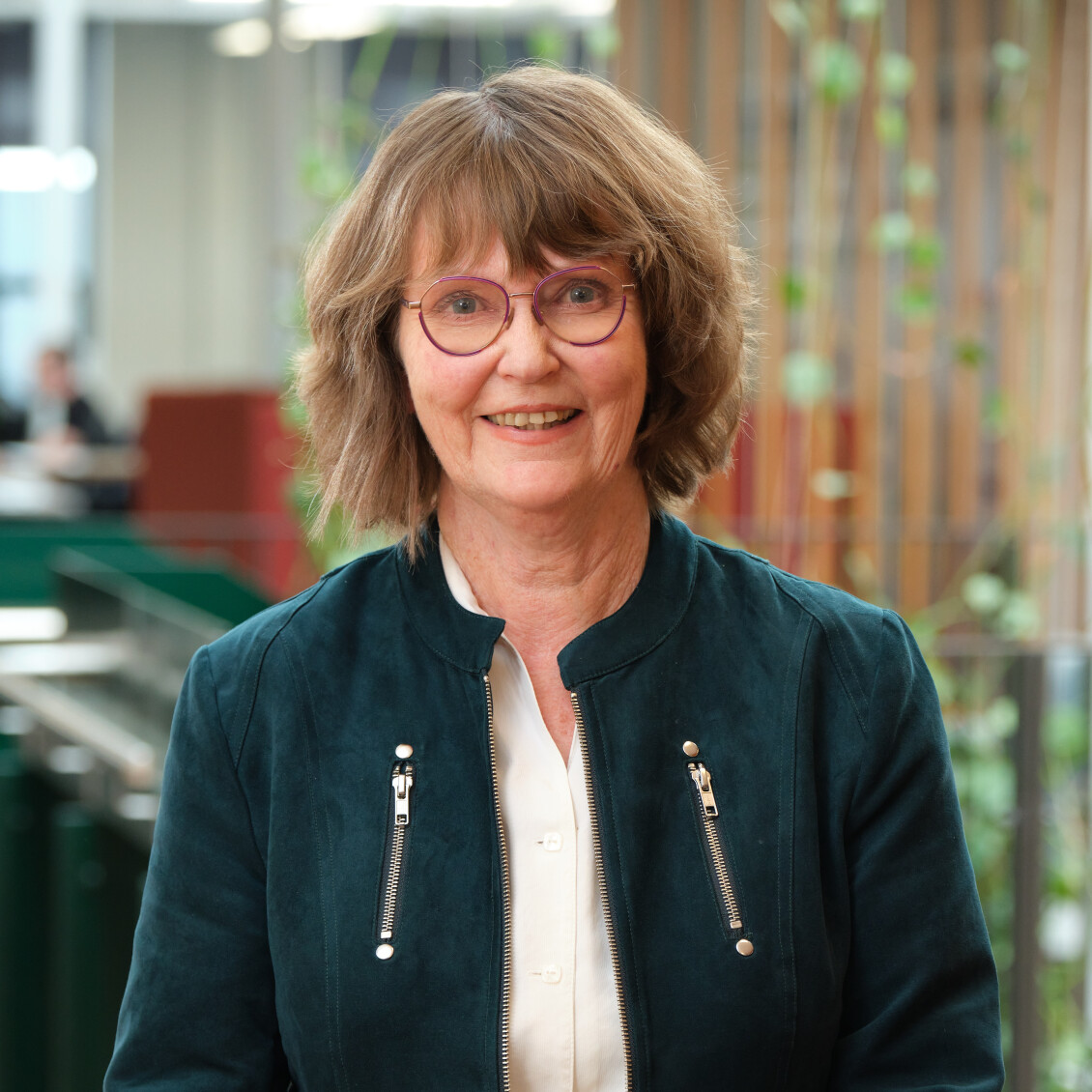
- Staples in 2025

3rd Mayor of South Wairarapa
- In office October 2004 – 13 October 2016
- Preceded by: John Read
- Succeeded by: Viv Napier

Deputy chair of the Greater Wellington Regional Council
- In office 30 October 2019 – 20 April 2026
- Chairperson: Daran Ponter
- Preceded by: Barbara Donaldson
- Succeeded by: Ros Connelly

Greater Wellington regional councillor for the Wairarapa constituency
- In office 14 October 2016 – 20 April 2026
- Preceded by: Gary McPhee
- Succeeded by: John Hart

Personal details
- Born: Adrienne Lee Darling; 5 December 1956 Featherston, New Zealand
- Died: 20 April 2026 (aged 69)
- Party: Independent

Adrienne Lee Staples ONZM (née Darling; 5 December 1956 – 20 April 2026) was a New Zealand local-body politician. She was the mayor of South Wairarapa for 12 years from 2004 to 2016, and was the first woman to serve in the role. In 2017 Staples was awarded the Order of the Rising Sun by the Japanese government, in recognition of her promotion of Japanese–New Zealand friendship and mutual understanding.

== Background ==
Staples was born in Featherston, New Zealand, on 5 December 1956. She ran a small manufacturing business based in Featherston and a Wellington IT consulting company. Staples died on 20 April 2026.

== Career ==
Staples was a member of the Featherston community board. She was elected Mayor of South Wairarapa in 2004, becoming the district's first female mayor.

In 2013, Staples and other Wairarapa mayors were the subject of a parody video based on the film Downfall. She and her husband threatened to sue the video's creator for defamation, and engaged lawyers to have YouTube remove the video.

After retiring from the mayoralty in 2016 she ran for a position on the Greater Wellington Regional Council, where she was elected the representative for the Wairarapa constituency. In 2019, Staples was elected deputy chair of the regional council, and was re-elected to the position in 2022. Staples ran for and won a fourth-term on the regional council in the 2025 elections, and was subsequently re-elected as deputy chair.

== Honours and awards ==
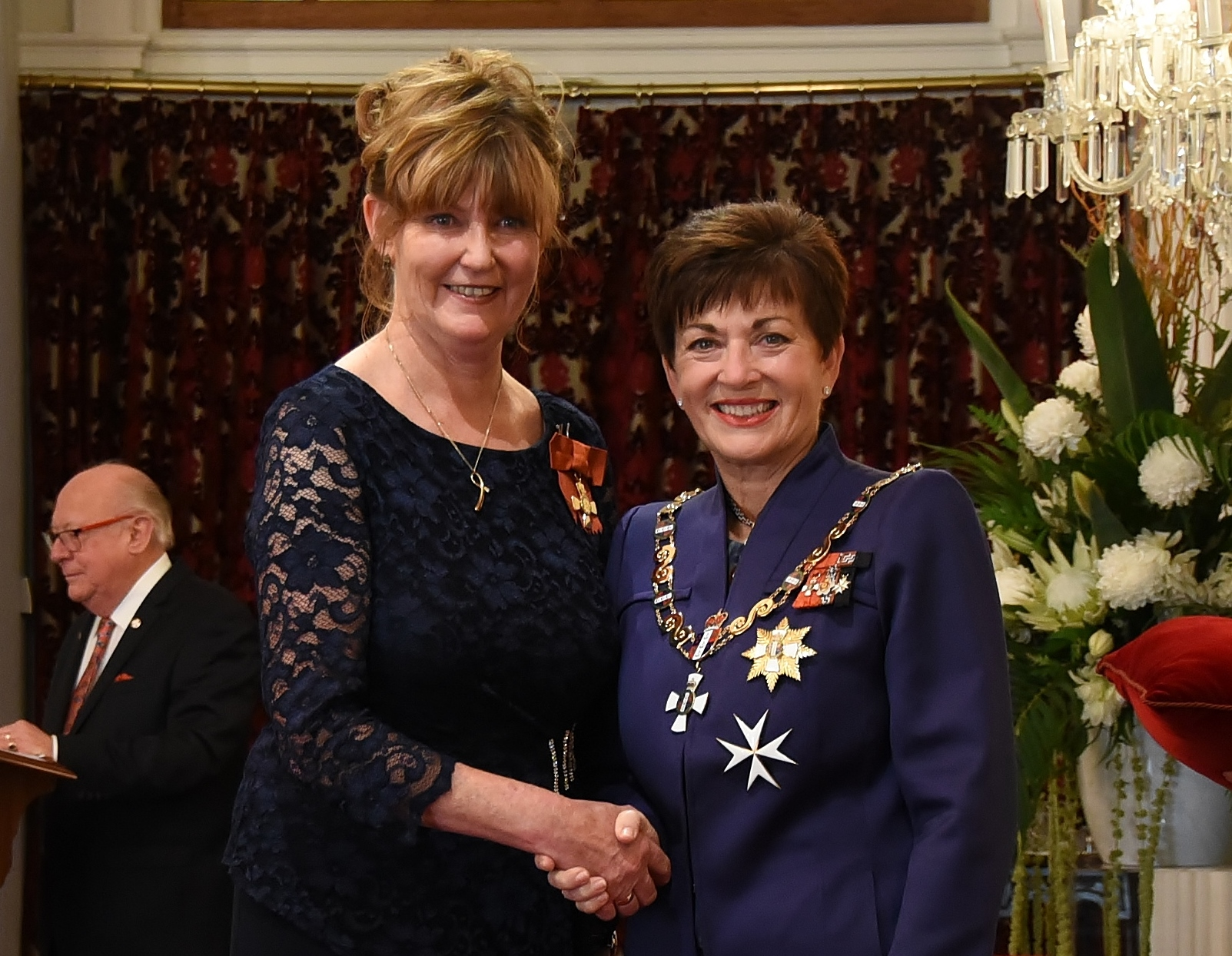
Staples (left), after her investiture as an Officer of the New Zealand Order of Merit by the governor-general, Dame Patsy Reddy, at Government House, Wellington, on 23 May 2017

In the 2017 New Year Honours, Staples was appointed an Officer of the New Zealand Order of Merit, for services to local government. The citation mentioned that Staples oversaw the completion of the redevelopment of Greytown's historic town hall, and the formation of the Cross Creek to Featherston cycle trail. Later in 2017, Staples was awarded the Order of the Rising Sun, Gold Rays with Rosette, by the Japanese government, in recognition of her promotion of Japanese–New Zealand friendship and mutual understanding. During her time as mayor, Staples hosted a Japanese choir that visited in remembrance of the 48 Japanese prisoners and 1 New Zealand guard killed at the Featherston prisoner-of-war camp in 1943.
