= Hutt City Council =

Territorial authority in New Zealand

Hutt City Council Te Awa Kairangi
- Coat of arms

- Brand logo

Type
- Type: Territorial authority of Lower Hutt
- Term limits: None

History
- Established: 1 November 1989; 36 years ago
- Preceded by: Lower Hutt City Council; Petone Borough Council; Eastbourne Borough Council; Wainuiomata District Council

Leadership
- Mayor: Ken Laban, Ind. since 18 October 2025
- Deputy: Keri Brown, Labour since 22 October 2025
- CEO: Jo Miller since 1 July 2019

Structure
- Seats: 14 (including mayor)
- Political groups: Independent (12); Labour (1); Independent Green (1)

Elections
- Voting system: First-past-the-post
- First election: 14 October 1989
- Last election: 11 October 2025
- Next election: 14 October 2028

Meeting place
- 30 Laings Road

Website
- huttcity.govt.nz

Hutt City Council (abbr. HCC; Māori: Te Awa Kairangi) is the territorial authority for the city of Lower Hutt, New Zealand. It serves as the city's local government alongside the Greater Wellington Regional Council as the regional council. From 1989 to 1991 the authority was known as Lower Hutt City Council.

The current council has existed since the 1989 local government reforms, prior to which local government in the area was split between four local authorities.

The governing body of the council has 13 councillors and is chaired by the mayor of Lower Hutt (currently Ken Laban since October 2025). There are also two community boards.

== History ==
=== Predecessors ===
In 1989, the former Lower Hutt City Council, the Petone Borough Council, the Eastbourne Borough Council, and the Wainuiomata District Council were amalgamated to form a new Lower Hutt City Council.

== Governing body ==
=== Mayor ===
One mayor is elected at-large; they chair meetings of the governing body and act as the head of local government in the city.

=== Current composition ===
The current members of the governing body of council are:

| Role | Portrait | Name | Affiliation | Ward |
|---|---|---|---|---|
| Mayor | | Ken Laban | Independent | Elected at-large |
| Deputy | | Keri Brown | Labour | Wainuiomata |
| Councillor | | Brady Dyer | Independent | At-large |
| Councillor | | Prabha Ravi | Independent | At-large |
| Councillor | | Tony Stallinger | Independent | At-large |
| Councillor | | Karen Yung | Independent | At-large |
| Councillor | | Mele Tonga-Grant | Independent | At-large |
| Councillor | | Chris Parkin | Independent Green | Western |
| Councillor | | Tui Lewis | Independent | Harbour |
| Councillor | | Naomi Shaw | Independent | Northern |
| Councillor | | Andy Mitchell | Independent | Northern |
| Councillor | | Glenda Barratt | Independent | Central |
| Councillor | | Simon Edwards | Independent | Central |
| Councillor | | Te Awa Puketapu | Independent | Mana Kairangi ki Tai Māori |

== Community boards ==
The council currently has two local community boards under the provisions of Part 4 of the Local Government Act 2002, with members elected using a first-past-the-post (FPP) system or appointed by the council. The community boards are as follows:

- Eastbourne Community Board;
- Wainuiomata Community Board.

From 1989 to 2025 the council also had a third community board covering Petone.

== Coat of arms ==
The City of Lower Hutt has a coat of arms, granted under the seal of the Garter King of Arms and the Norroy and Ulster King of Arms on 25 November 1955. The blazon is:

Coat of arms of Hutt City Council
| Crest A Tūī Bird holding in the beak a spring of Kōwhai flowered proper. Escutcheon Argent on Water in base Barry Wavy a Barquentine in full sail proper, flying at the fore-mast a Flag Azure, thereon a representation of the constellation of the Southern Cross Or; on a Chief Vert a Cog wheel between two Garbs Gold, over all a Canton Argent charged with a Chevron between three Fleurs de lys Sable. Supporters On the dexter side the figure of a Farmer supporting with the interior Hand a long-handled Shovel resting his exterior hand on a Sheep Dog sejant, and on the sinister side the figure of a Māori Warrior vested proper, supporting with the interior Hand a long Spear also proper. |

== See also ==
Territorial authorities bordering Hutt City Council:

- Upper Hutt City Council
- Porirua City Council
- Wellington City Council
