= Ken Laban =

New Zealand rugby league footballer and politician (born 1957)

His Worship Fauono Ken Laban
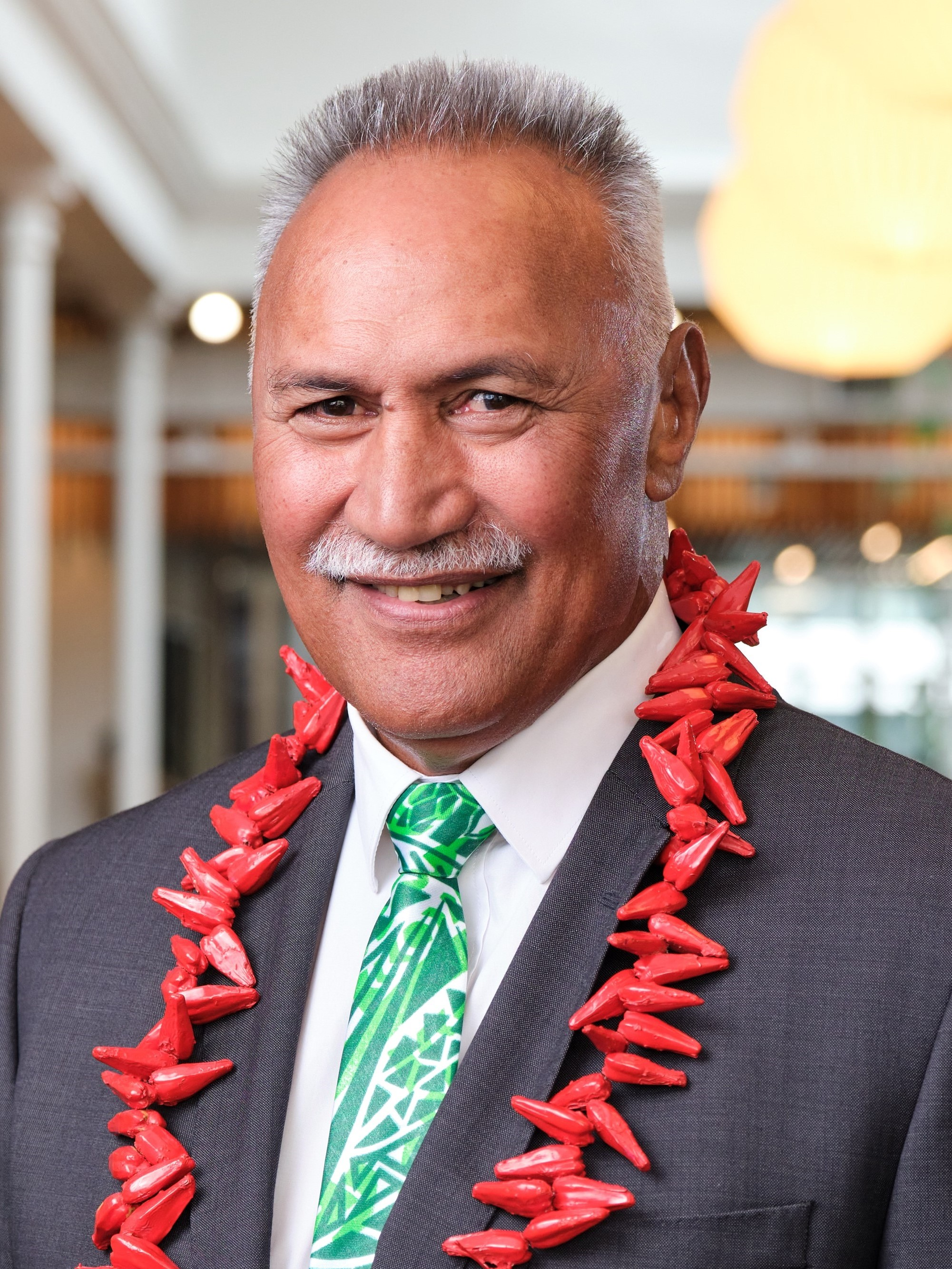
- Councillor Ken Laban

21st Mayor of Lower Hutt
- Incumbent
- Assumed office 17 October 2025
- Deputy: Keri Brown
- Preceded by: Campbell Barry

Greater Wellington Regional Councillor
- In office October 2013 – October 2025

Hutt City Councillor
- In office October 2010 – October 2013

Personal details
- Born: 1957 (age 68–69)
- Relatives: Winnie Laban (sister); Jacob Laban (nephew)
- Education: Scots College
- Occupation: Police officer Politician; Broadcaster
- Rugby league career

Playing information
Club
Years	Team	Pld	T	G	FG	P
198?–90	Wainuiomata Lions

Fauono Ken Laban (born 1957) is a New Zealand rugby league footballer, broadcaster and politician. Between 2013 and 2025 he was a member of the Greater Wellington Regional Council, having previously been a councillor for the Hutt City Council from 2010 to 2013. In 2025 he was elected mayor of Lower Hutt, becoming New Zealand's first Pasifika mayor.

== Early life and family ==
Laban grew up in Wainuiomata with his older sister Winnie Laban, who was later a Member of Parliament and Minister of the Crown. His parents, Amy and Ken Snr, came to New Zealand from Samoa in the 1950s; both of their fathers were Samoan politicians in the Legislative Assembly of Samoa. He attended Scots College in Wellington.

He married Donna Liddell, a police inspector. They have three children.

Laban was bestowed with the matai title of Fauono from his mother’s village, Vaiala.

== Career ==
Straight after leaving school he joined the New Zealand Police, working there for 16 years. He then briefly went into community work before entering broadcasting. In 1990 he became a sports commentator for TVNZ. In 2000 he began commentating rugby on Sky.

He was a noted rugby league player and played for the Wainuiomata Lions. His final game for the club was their victory in the 1990 Lion Red Cup final, where Wainuiomata beat Otahuhu 34–12, thought to be the first win by a non-Auckland team at Carlaw Park. He later coached rugby league until retiring in 1999.

== Political career ==
Laban has had a Lower Hutt-based political and governance career for more than twenty years. In 2004 he stood for a seat on the Hutt Valley District Health Board (DHB) for the Labour Party affiliated Hutt 2020 ticket and was elected; he remained a member of the DHB until its disestablishment in 2022. In 2007 he stood for Mayor of Lower Hutt as the Hutt 2020 candidate, but was unsuccessful, in a close three-horse race with incumbent David Ogden and city councillor Ray Wallace. In 2010 he was elected to both the Hutt City Council as a councillor for the Wainuiomata ward and the Hutt Mana Charitable Trust as a trustee representing Lower Hutt. He continued on the Trust until 2022. In 2013 he stood down from the city council and won a seat on the Wellington Regional Council, which he retained in 2016, 2019 and 2022. In December 2024 he was appointed to the board of Sport New Zealand.

Laban contested the Lower Hutt mayoralty for a second time in the 2025 Hutt City Council election. He was successful, becoming New Zealand’s first Pasifika mayor.
