= South Wairarapa District =

- Territorial authority district
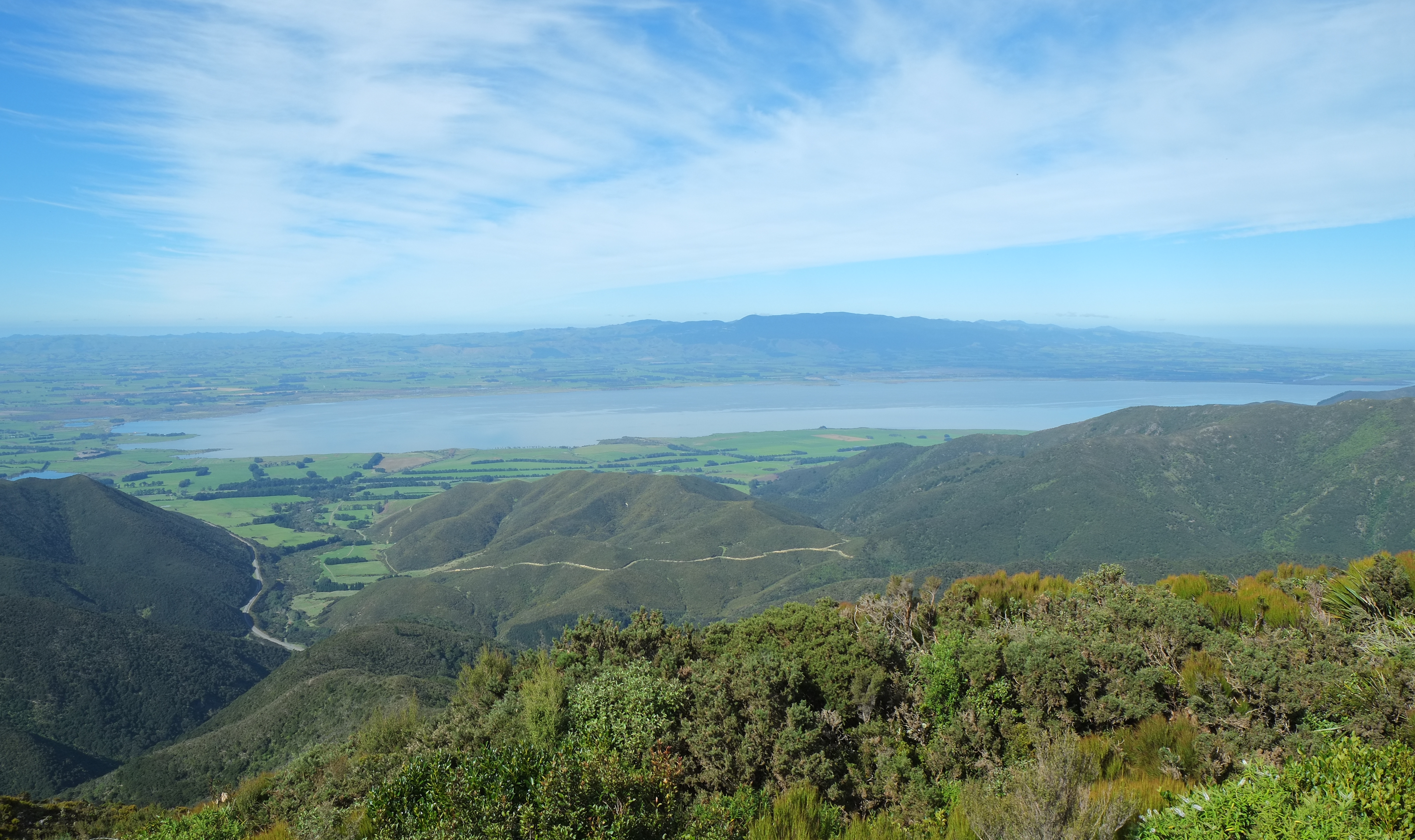

- South Wairarapa district within the North Island
- Coordinates: 41°17′06″S 175°34′44″E
- Country: New Zealand
- Region: Wellington
- Seat: Martinborough
- Wards: List: Martinborough; Featherston; Greytown

Government
  - Mayor: Fran Wilde
  - Territorial authority: South Wairarapa District Council

Area
  - Total: 2,387.76 km^{2} (921.92 sq mi)

Population (June 2025)
  - Total: 12,200
  - Density: 5.11/km^{2} (13.2/sq mi)
- Time zone: UTC+12 (NZST)
  - Summer (DST): UTC+13 (NZDT)
- Postcode(s): 5710, 5711, 5712, 5740, 5741, 5742, 5771, 5772, 5773, 5781, 5782, 5783, 5784, 5794
- Area code: 06
- Website: www.swdc.govt.nz

The South Wairarapa District is a district at the south-east tip of the North Island of New Zealand, governed by the South Wairarapa District Council. The district comprises the southernmost part of the Wairarapa, and is part of the Wellington Region.

== Features ==
The district comprises the floodplain of the Ruamāhanga River and the associated Lake Wairarapa, as well as the long southern stretch of Palliser Bay. To the west of the plains rise the eastern slopes of the Remutaka Range, the crest of which forms the western boundary of the district, while the Aorangi Range lies to the south-east. The southernmost point of the North Island, Cape Palliser, is in the South Wairarapa.

While it is predominantly rural, the South Wairarapa has three towns. The two largest towns, almost identical in population, are Greytown and Featherston. Greytown is where Arbor Day was first celebrated in New Zealand. The Fell Locomotive Museum in Featherston exhibits the only remaining steam-powered Fell railway locomotive in the world. The third-largest town and the seat of the district council is Martinborough; it is the centre of a nationally important wine-producing area.

It is expected that the number of people living in the district's urban areas will increase due to rising property prices in Wellington proper, and the proximity to transport links.

== Demographics ==
South Wairarapa District covers 2,387.76 km^{2} (921.92 sq mi) and had an estimated population of 12,200 as of June 2025, with a population density of 5.1 people per km^{2}.

Historical population
Year	Pop.	±% p.a.
2006	8,892	—
2013	9,528	+0.99%
2018	10,575	+2.11%
2023	11,811	+2.24%

South Wairarapa District had a population of 11,811 in the 2023 New Zealand census, an increase of 1,236 people (11.7%) since the 2018 census, and an increase of 2,283 people (24.0%) since the 2013 census. There were 5,874 males, 5,886 females and 45 people of other genders in 4,953 dwellings. 3.8% of people identified as LGBTIQ+. The median age was 47.5 years (compared with 38.1 years nationally). There were 2,037 people (17.2%) aged under 15 years, 1,458 (12.3%) aged 15 to 29, 5,580 (47.2%) aged 30 to 64, and 2,736 (23.2%) aged 65 or older.

People could identify as more than one ethnicity. The results were 90.1% European (Pākehā); 15.4% Māori; 2.7% Pasifika; 3.5% Asian; 0.7% Middle Eastern, Latin American and African New Zealanders (MELAA); and 2.5% other, which includes people giving their ethnicity as "New Zealander". English was spoken by 97.7%, Māori language by 2.7%, Samoan by 0.6% and other languages by 7.8%. No language could be spoken by 1.8% (e.g. too young to talk). New Zealand Sign Language was known by 0.4%. The percentage of people born overseas was 18.6, compared with 28.8% nationally.

Religious affiliations were 27.5% Christian, 0.4% Hindu, 0.6% Māori religious beliefs, 0.6% Buddhist, 0.5% New Age, 0.2% Jewish, and 1.0% other religions. People who answered that they had no religion were 61.6%, and 7.6% of people did not answer the census question.

Of those at least 15 years old, 2,031 (20.8%) people had a bachelor's or higher degree, 5,013 (51.3%) had a post-high school certificate or diploma, and 2,010 (20.6%) people exclusively held high school qualifications. The median income was $42,800, compared with $41,500 nationally. 1,569 people (16.1%) earned over $100,000 compared to 12.1% nationally. The employment status of those at least 15 was that 4,851 (49.6%) people were employed full-time, 1,554 (15.9%) were part-time, and 186 (1.9%) were unemployed.

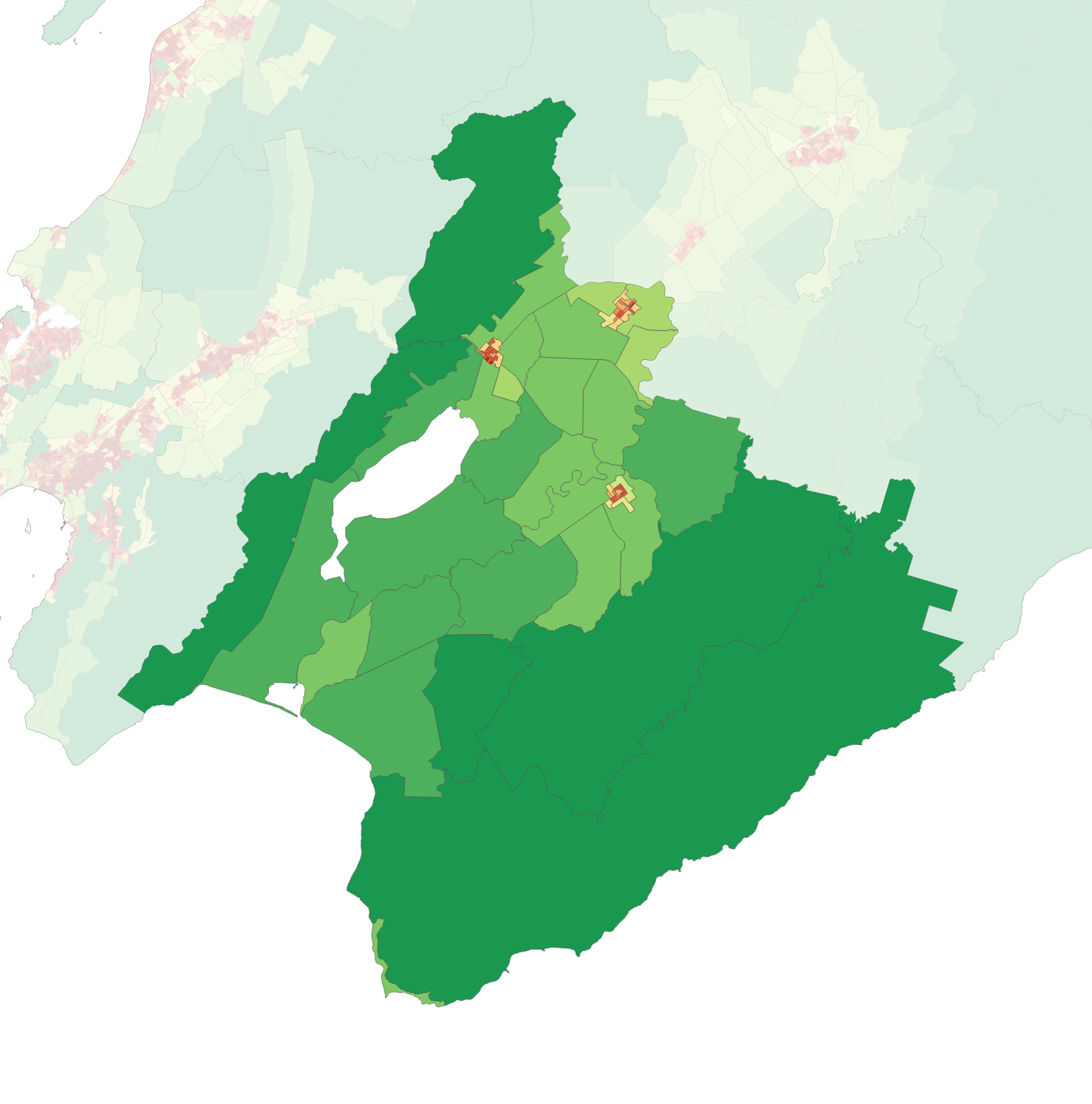
Population density in the 2023 census

Individual wards
Name	Area (km^{2})	Population	Density (per km^{2})	Dwellings	Median age	Median income
Greytown Ward	273.30	4,110	15.0	1,725	50.8 years	$43,500
Featherston Ward	372.13	3,654	9.8	1,515	41.9 years	$39,300
Martinborough Ward	1,732.33	4,047	2.3	1,716	48.9 years	$45,400
New Zealand					38.1 years	$41,500

Individual statistical areas
Name	Area (km^{2})	Population	Density (per km^{2})	Dwellings	Median age	Median income
Tauherenikau	337.66	1,602	4.7	618	47.7 years	$43,800
Kahutara	458.01	1,128	2.5	441	39.7 years	$46,600
Featherston	3.19	2,793	875.5	1,155	41.3 years	$37,900
Greytown	5.07	2,772	546.7	1,212	51.9 years	$42,800
Aorangi Forest	1,578.96	1,641	1.0	696	49.3 years	$46,400
Martinborough	4.86	1,875	385.8	828	52.2 years	$44,100
New Zealand					38.1 years	$41,500

== Economy ==
The South Wairarapa District has a modelled gross domestic product (GDP) of $426 million in the year to March 2024, 0.1% of New Zealand's national GDP. The GDP per capita is $34,344, ranking second-lowest out of 66 territorial authorities (ahead of the Kāpiti Coast District).

== Transport ==
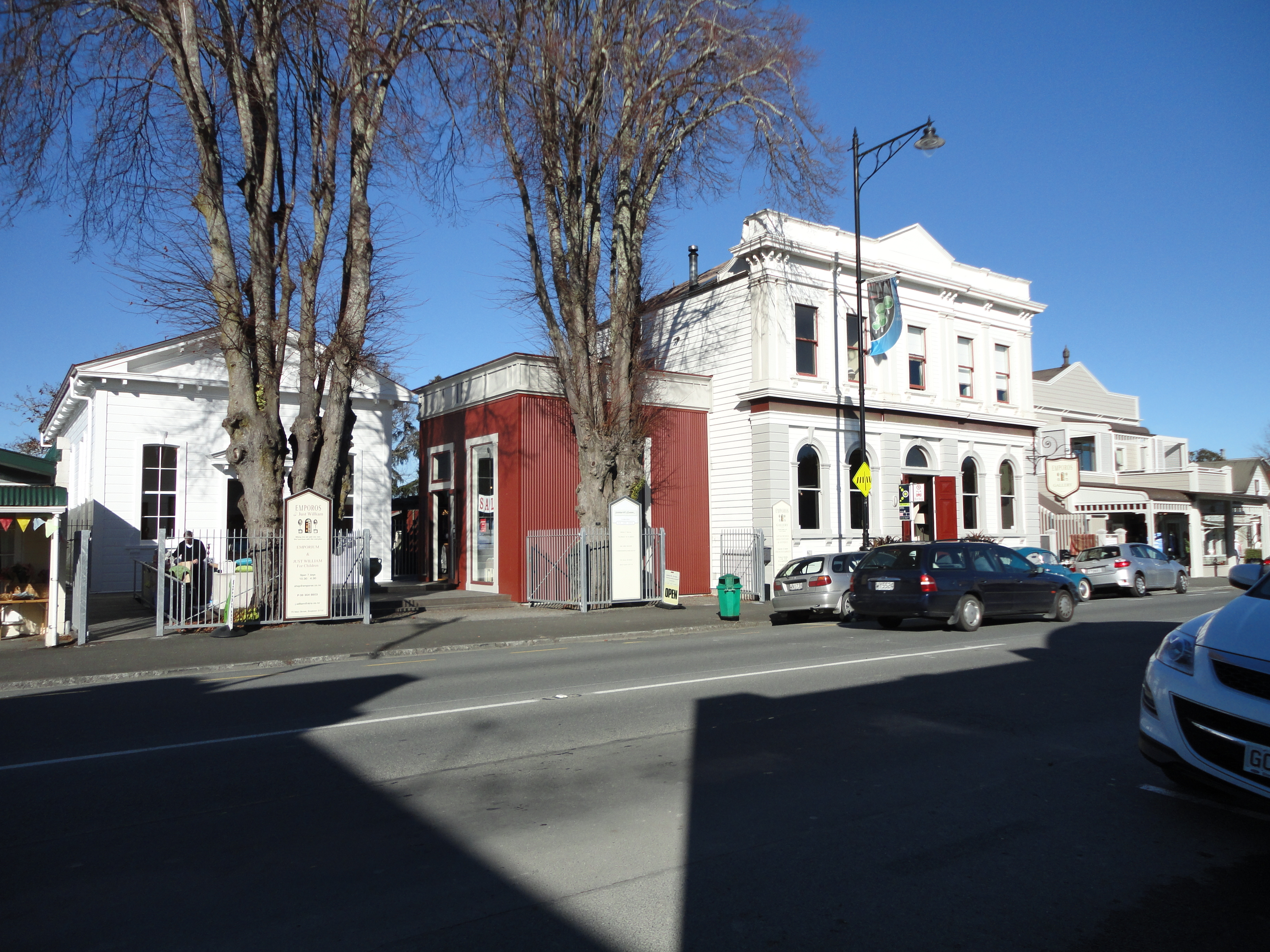
Bank of New Zealand building in Greytown

Because of South Wairarapa's proximity to the capital city of New Zealand, Wellington, there are close links between the two areas. For example, some people live in South Wairarapa and commute to Wellington each day to work; others live and work in Wellington while spending weekends in South Wairarapa. The Wairarapa Line, part of the Metlink public transport network for the Wellington region, passes through the district (which is served by the two stations of Featherston and Woodside) and provides a faster method of transport into the city than the Remutaka pass road. Metlink buses also provide services to Greytown and Martinborough from the railway stations and Masterton.

== Local and regional government ==
The South Wairarapa District Council is the territorial authority responsible for the area. The council consists of nine councillors; the current mayor is Fran Wilde. The three towns also have their own community boards.
