= Daran Ponter =

New Zealand politician (born 1968)

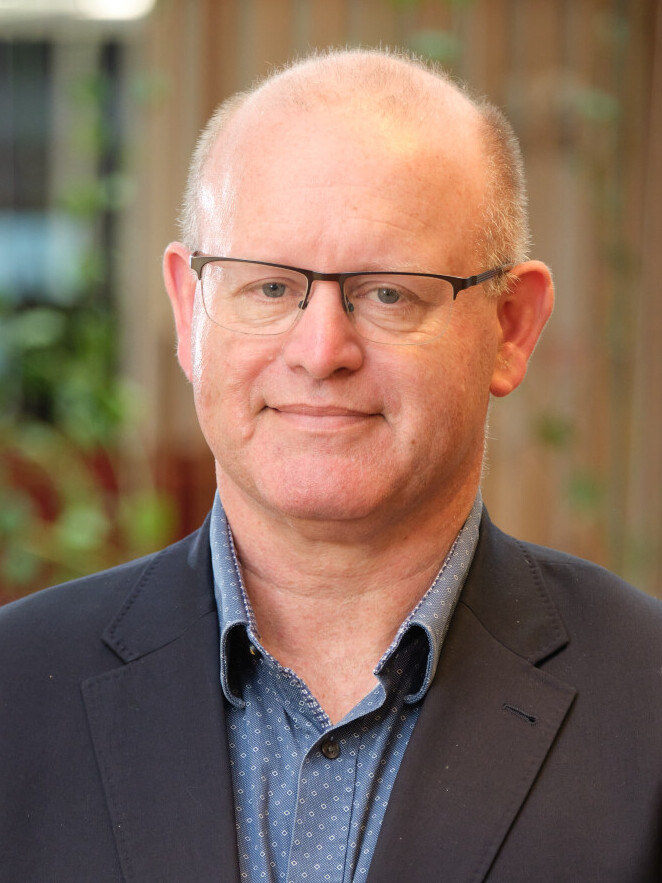
- Ponter in 2025

Chair of the Wellington Regional Council
- Incumbent
- Assumed office 30 October 2019
- Preceded by: Chris Laidlaw

Personal details
- Born: 20 February 1968 (age 58) Kitwe, Zambia
- Party: Labour
- Spouse: Vickie
- Children: 2
- Education: Massey University, Victoria University of Wellington

Daran Mark Ponter (born 20 February 1968) is a New Zealand local-body politician who on 30 October 2019 succeeded Chris Laidlaw as the chair of the Greater Wellington Regional Council.

== Biography ==
=== Early life ===
Ponter was born in Kitwe in Zambia's Central Province, Zambia. Soon after his birth his family relocated to Birmingham, United Kingdom and then to Copenhagen, Denmark. In 1973 they moved to Suva, Fiji where he attended Veiuto Primary School. Arriving in New Zealand in 1980, Ponter attended Palmerston North Intermediate Normal School, followed by Palmerston North Boys High School. He was an American Field Service exchange student to Kuala Lumpur, Malaysia in 1985/86. He studied sociology and geography at Massey University. He was a Massey scholar in 1989. After graduation he obtained a Masters of Public Policy from Victoria University of Wellington. Before politics he worked as a regional planner in the Bay of Plenty and public policy adviser in various ministries in Wellington, most notably Te Puni Kōkiri. Later, he established and continues to run an independent public policy consultancy with his wife Vickie.

Between 2000 and 2004 Ponter was instrumental in leading the establishment of the Maori Television Service for Te Puni Kokiri. Ponter has worked on seven Treaty of Waitangi settlements, including the settlement for the Waikato River and the Port Nicholson Block settlement in Wellington. He also led the negotiation of seven regional aquaculture agreements to recognise Maori commercial interests in aquaculture. In 2000 he was private secretary to Parekura Horomia, Minister for Maori Development, and in 2018, private secretary to Nanaia Mahuta, Minister for Maori Development.

=== Political career ===
Ponter first stood for office in 1998 where he unsuccessfully contested a seat on the Wellington Regional Council as part of the Labour Party ticket. In 2001 he stood for the Wellington City Council in the Eastern Ward, but was again unsuccessful.

He was first elected to the regional council in 2010 serving until 2013 when he failed to secure re-election. However he was appointed a council member again in April 2016 to fill the vacancy caused by the resignation of former chairperson Fran Wilde. He was re-elected for two further terms in both 2016 and 2019. Following the 2019 elections he was elected chairperson of the council unopposed.

In May 2020, the regional council confirmed all fares would be fully subsidised until the end of June, making all train and bus journeys free.

Ponter was re-elected to the regional council in the 2025 elections. He was re-elected as chair by his fellow councillors.

Political offices
Preceded by Chris Laidlaw	Chair of the Wellington Regional Council; 2019–present	Incumbent
