= Shelly Bay =

Bay in Wellington City

Coordinates: 41.296°S 174.819°E

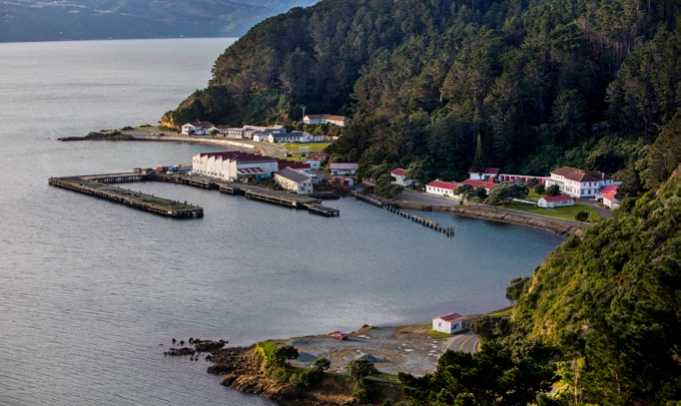
Shelly Bay and the former defence force base

Shelly Bay is a bay on the Miramar Peninsula of Wellington, New Zealand.

The area was settled by a collection of peoples from multiple Māori iwi in the 1820s and 1830s. It was later bought by the New Zealand Company, in a sale the Crown apologised for in 2008, admitting that the deed was flawed and promises were never kept.

Most of the land was owned by the New Zealand Defence Force for 124 years until 2009. During that time, land was reclaimed and the area was used as a submarine mining base, a naval station, Airforce base, and an arts centre.

Shelly Bay was the site of a planned residential development. The development was the subject of multiple court cases and other opposition. Opponents of the development included the then-Mayor of Wellington Andy Foster, film-maker Peter Jackson, some businesses and some Māori. In November 2020, the Wellington City Council agreed to sell and lease land to the development, against the wishes of mayor Foster. The bay was occupied by Mau Whenua, a Māori group opposing the development, from November 2020 through to May 2022. While ground broke on the project in January 2023, the project was announced as aborted in September 2023, and the land was sold to Peter Jackson and Fran Walsh.

== Geography and wildlife ==
Shelly Bay is a small bay in the larger Evans Bay on the west of the Miramar Peninsula, north of its isthmus, and is about 8 km by road from Wellington's city centre. The land at the bay is part of the Wellington suburb of Maupuia and includes some reclaimed land, with nearby hillsides excavated to provide fill. According to Land Information New Zealand, the name "Shelly Bay" became official in July 2020. LINZ does not provide the origin of the name.

The land at Shelly Bay is at risk from coastal flooding due to sea level rises. The head of Victoria University of Wellington's (VUW's) Geography, Environment and Earth Sciences department predicted in 2019 that within forty years, damage previously seen once every 100 years would occur once every three or four years. NZ SeaRise research released in 2023 predicts that sea level at Shelly Bay will be 30 cm higher than today by 2080, and if land movement is factored in this 30 cm rise will occur by 2040. He considered that a sea wall was feasible but that protecting the road around the coast would be problematic. Another VUW professor wrote in 2023 that Shelly Bay will be "particularly vulnerable" to extreme events as it is a low-lying coastal strip of land, backed by steep cliffs, and given that Wellington Harbour itself is susceptible to these events.

Little blue penguins live in the bay, with some nesting underneath the buildings. Te Papa staff have estimated that about half of the penguins in the region use the harbour mouth alongside Mirimar Peninsula during their breeding cycle.

== Use by Māori, the military and artists ==
=== Māori history and European land purchase ===
In the 1820s and 1830s, a collection of peoples from multiple Māori iwi (tribes), including Te Āti Awa, Taranaki, Ngāti Ruanui, and Ngāti Tama, migrated to the region. This group became known as Taranaki Whānui ki te Upoko o te Ika. The village sited at the northern end of the bay was named Maru-Kai-Kuru.

In 1839 the bay was bought by the New Zealand Company along with most of Wellington. The deed of purchase would later be described as "seriously" flawed. It was in English only and had no map to define boundaries. The Crown assumed ownership of the area two years later, and perhaps in acknowledgement for the flawed purchase agreement, assigned one-tenth of the land to Taranaki Whanui, though this put pressure on people to move from lands to places that were not adequate to sustain their way of life.

=== Defence installations ===
==== Coastal mining ====
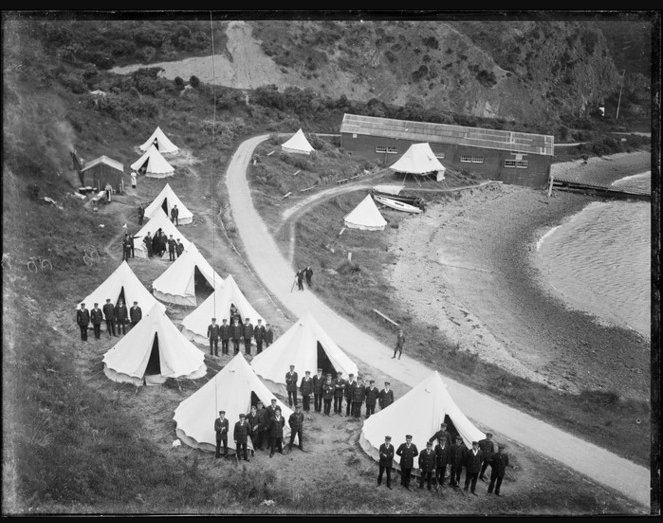
Submarine and Torpedo Mining Corps annual camp, Shelly Bay, Wellington, taken about 1899

By the 1880s, Shelly Bay was under the private ownership of Coutts Crawford. In 1886, the Crown requisitioned the land for defence purposes under the Public Works Act, and in the following years, became the site for an anti-submarine mine depot. This was a part of the major build-up of New Zealand's coastal defences during the late Victorian era, due to hostilities and fears of a Russian naval attack. By 1895, coastal defences in Wellington extended over the whole of the northern area of Watts Peninsula from Scorching Bay to Shelly Bay. Their task was to maintain harbour defence mines to fend off potential attacking Russian Navy ships if they arrived through the inlet towards the city. The installation was operated by the Wellington Submarine Mining Volunteers.

In 1891, the base was the site of an explosion, killing one man. An inquest was held, with its jury concluding that the accident occurred through the "accidental explosion of gun-cotton", but there was not sufficient direct evidence to determine what caused the explosion. A memorial plaque for Sapper Penfold, Sergeant Wilson, Corporal Bramley and Lance Corporal Palmes, of the Wellington Submarine Mining Volunteers, is located in Old St Paul's, Wellington.

In 1895, Māori prisoners were put to work in Shelly Bay. These prisoners were followers of Parihaka leaders. The work included helping to build the road from Shelly Bay to Scorching Bay.

==== Navy base ====
HMNZS Cook
- Active: 1907–1946
- Country: New Zealand
- Branch: Royal Navy; Royal New Zealand Navy

In 1907, the base was transferred to the Royal Navy, which constructed a new wharf along with munitions stores and an aerial tramway into the side of Mount Crawford, with limited use during The Great War.

During World War II, the base saw significant expansion, with an expanded wharf, further ammunition stores and a new slipway. In addition, new accommodation, workshops and a small hospital were constructed on land reclaimed from the harbour. The buildings had a combined floor space of 69,050 square feet. The wharf totalled 37,200 square feet and had 1,200 feet of berthing space. Four Fairmile coastal patrol boats were based in Wellington, with the base being used as a primary repair and maintenance location for them. Following the creation of the Royal New Zealand Navy in 1941, ownership of the base was transferred, with the base receiving the name HMNZS Cook.

==== Air Force base ====
RNZAF Base Shelly Bay
- Active: 1946–1995
- Country: New Zealand
- Branch: Royal New Zealand Air Force
- Mottos: Maori: Hapaingia Te Kaupapa ("Support for our superior headquarters")

In 1946 ownership of the base was transferred to the Royal New Zealand Air Force, and renamed Shelly Bay Air Force Base. Its purpose included a dormitory and catering centre, the latter employing 50 full-time caterers. It held as many as five formal events each week, hosting top military leaders and on one occasion Prince Charles.

The Airforce base closed in 1995 and the New Zealand Defence Force put the land up for disposal. A naval museum was on the site but this was shut in 2008.

=== Art Base (2000-2021) ===
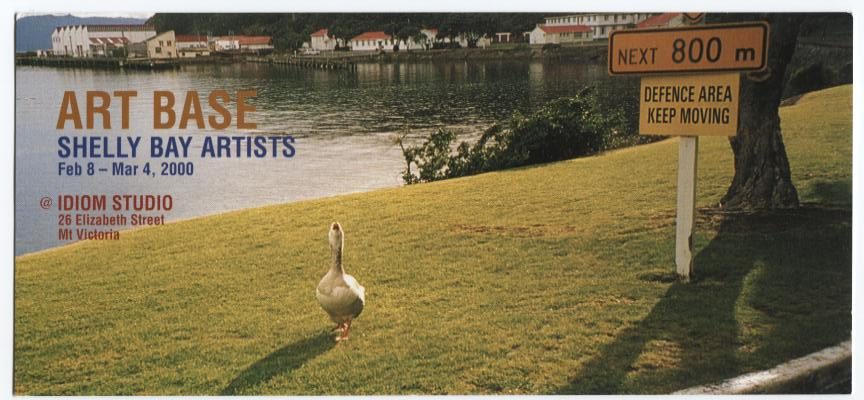
Art Base (inc.) held a collective exhibition at Idiom Gallery. The resident geese appeared to be acting as sentinels at the property's entrance. (Photo Barry Thomas)

In 2000, under the name "Art Base", 28 resident artists called for the bay to become a cultural centre with students, a café, gallery and studios. The incorporated society offered to talk with the Wellington Tenths Trust about these plans but the Office for Treaty Settlements had put the land aside. Artists continued to lease studios, rehearsal rooms and galleries continuously until 2021; a 21 year occupation. Artists included Jeanne MacCaskill, Michael Browne and co-founder Barry Thomas.

In 2009 a very popular cafe, the Chocolate Fish, took over the lease of the1892 built Mess Hall. It ran successfully employing 28 staff till 2025 when its lease was not renewed by the new owners.

=== Treaty of Waitangi settlement ===
In 2003, the Waitangi Tribunal ruled that iwi were owed compensation over Shelly Bay. On 14 February 2009 4.5 hectares of land was handed over to the iwi Taranaki Whānui ki te Upoko o te Ika (also shortened to Taranaki Whānui) who bought the land as part of a $25 million Treaty of Waitangi settlement. The settlement related to wrongdoings in and arising from the 1839 land purchase. The Crown apologised over this sale, saying the deed was flawed and promises were never kept. The Crown failed to set aside one-tenth of the land for Māori as required by the terms, took land for public purposes without compensation, and locked up remaining Māori land in perpetual leases. The settlement included the right to buy the Shelly Bay property (as well as several other around Wellington) and the iwi chose to do so at a cost of at least $13.3 million.

== Use after closure of military base ==
A number of artists had rented studio spaces in the area under their collective name "Art Base". The area also included the Chocolate Fish cafe; former mayor Kerry Prendergast described the cafe as "iconic" and it became renowned after actors and crew from the Lord of the Rings trilogy frequented it. It also had a campsite. Some of the 2005 film King Kong was filmed in Shelly Bay, including construction of the giant wall that separates Kong from the rest of Skull Island. Shelly Bay is a short drive from the Miramar studios used for filming the movie.

Multiple uses for the land of Shelly Bay were proposed after the closure of the defence base, including a casino, an indoor rainforest biome, a cultural centre and a movie museum, the latter being proposed by director Peter Jackson. The Wellington City Council, in 1998, sought to have it kept as park land, while the defence minister sought to zone it a suburban centre. This dispute went to the Environment Court which ultimately resulted it being zoned suburban but with a proviso that development should be done to protect the character of the area.

Buildings previously part of the defence base had had little or no maintenance since the base ceased operations. The wharf itself had almost rotted away. Several buildings contain the carcinogen asbestos. In June 2023 a fire destroyed one of the area's landmark buildings. The fire was treated as suspicious. Because of the asbestos in the building, an exclusion zone was set up and people were warned to avoid the area.

== Planned residential development ==
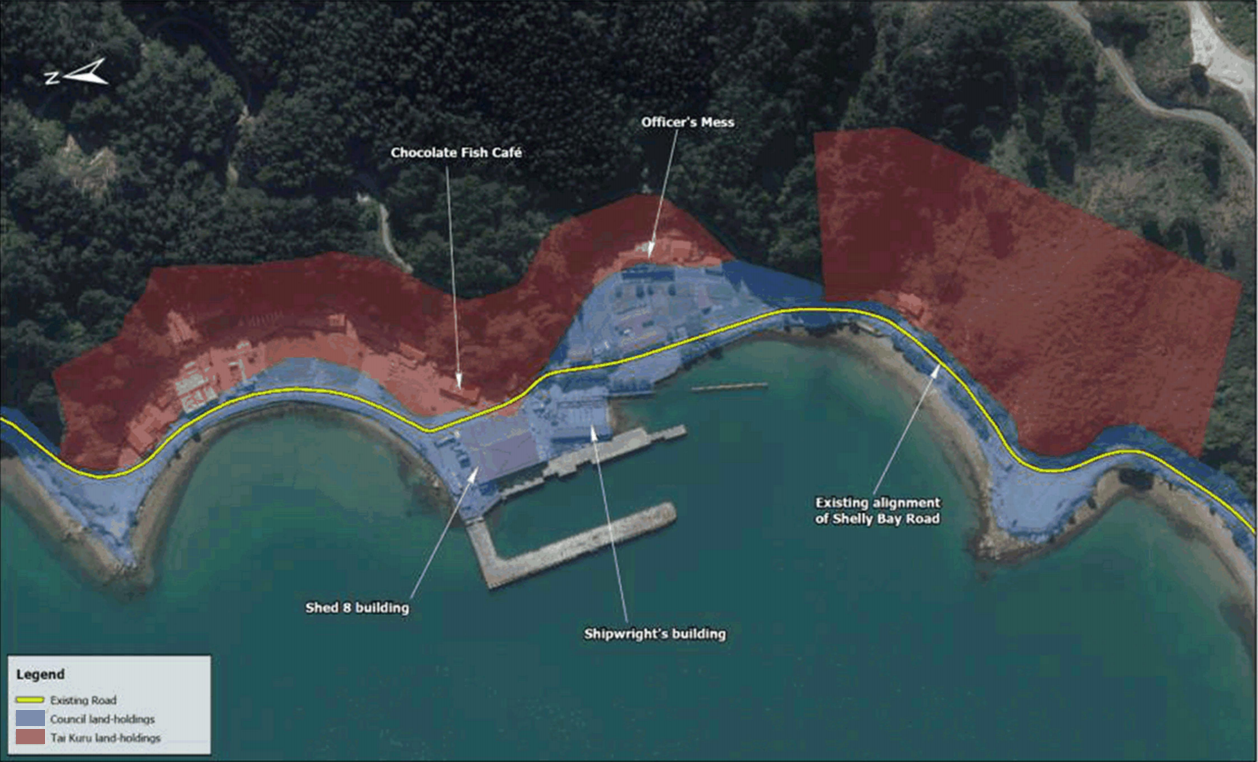
Map showing part of Shelly Bay and its ownership as of April 2017

Ian Cassels, director of the property development company The Wellington Company, had planned a 350-house development for the land since 2014. The project faced legal, bureaucratic, and other barriers and was controversial; news site Stuff reported that it wrote about 400 articles on Shelly Bay between 2011 and 2019.

=== Resource consent ===
A resource consent, required for the development, was first granted by Wellington City Council in 2017. The consent was legally challenged by the lobby group Enterprise Miramar. A 2018 Court of Appeal decision quashed that resource consent, saying that the Council wrongly interpreted law when it decided to grant it. Following the court decision, there was a reconsideration of the consent process, conducted by independent commissioners, which was completed in October 2019. These commissioners approved a new resource consent. This consent allowed for more intensive housing than Wellington's district plan would ordinarily allow. As of 2020, Enterprise Miramar continued to oppose the resource consent.

=== Sale of iwi-owned land and objections from Māori groups ===
Cassels purchased land for the development from the Taranaki Whānui iwi. Much of the land, which was officially owned by an entity called Port Nicholson Block Settlement Trust (PNBST), was sold in June 2017 for $2 million, less than the iwi had paid for it. Sale of all the land had initially been voted on, and members of the Taranaki Whānui iwi voted against the sale, but the sale of a portion of the land was a smaller matter and did not require a vote. Mau Whenua, a group of Taranaki Whānui members, said the sale neither had the will nor mandate of iwi members and pledged to get the land back. PNBST said in a newsletter that it had to make the deal to survive as it was cash-strapped.

A deal to sell the remaining land for $10 million was made by PNBST, also in 2019. Mau Whenua members obtained a caveat on a sale in July 2019, which prevents a sale unless it is withdrawn, removed by the High Court, or expires. However, PNBST had already made the deal to sell the land prior to the caveat, and Cassels stated he was confident he could get the High Court to remove the caveat. Opponents of the sale say there was no discussion of the sale before the deal was made. The caveat lapsed in December 2019 and the listed owner of this parcel of land was a company owned by Cassels and his partner.

In December 2019 PNBST announced by a newsletter to Taranaki Whānui members that it was aiming to become involved again in the Shelly Bay development. The newsletter stated that PNBST was in talks with Cassels' company to buy land at Shelly Bay from the company. A later agreement, made in 2021, established that the iwi will have a greater stake in the development project than previously proposed, including owning all commercial assets and securing a “distinctive” presence in the area.

In November 2020, starting as "a one-man stand" by Anaru Mepham, Mau Whenua began an occupation of Shelly Bay, putting up tents. Mayor Andy Foster, who opposed the development, showed up to help erect tents. Several councillors said that it was disgraceful for the mayor to support opposition to a council decision, though Foster said he thought he was attending a "community gathering". In January 2021, the developers sent a cease-and-desist letter to try to remove the protestors, but the occupation continued. In November 2021, Taranaki Whānui served the occupiers with an eviction notice; other groups calling for an end to the occupation included two local marae. The occupation ended in May 2022.

=== Proposed sale of Council-owned land ===
The proposed development also required Wellington City Council to sell some parcels of land, and lease others, to the developers. Councillors had voted in favour of the sales and leases in September 2017 and granted Council chief executive the power to do so, but after the issues with the resource consent and disputes over whether councillors had all the correct information, council chief executive Kevin Lavery refused to make the transaction and indicated in 2019 that the matter would likely go to a new vote.

The Shelly Bay sale became an election issue in the October 2019 Wellington local elections, and most candidates had a position on the development. Prior to the election most councillors supported the development, but after the election, it was reported that most councillors opposed it. The mayoral election at the same time also saw Wellington mayor Justin Lester, who supported the proposal, replaced by Andy Foster, who as a councillor opposed it for several years and whose election campaign centred on stopping the development.

In a vote of November 2020, Wellington City councillors voted 9–6 in favour of the proposal to sell 0.3 hectares of council land and lease another 0.6 hectares. Mayor Foster called the decision "sad".

=== Other objections ===
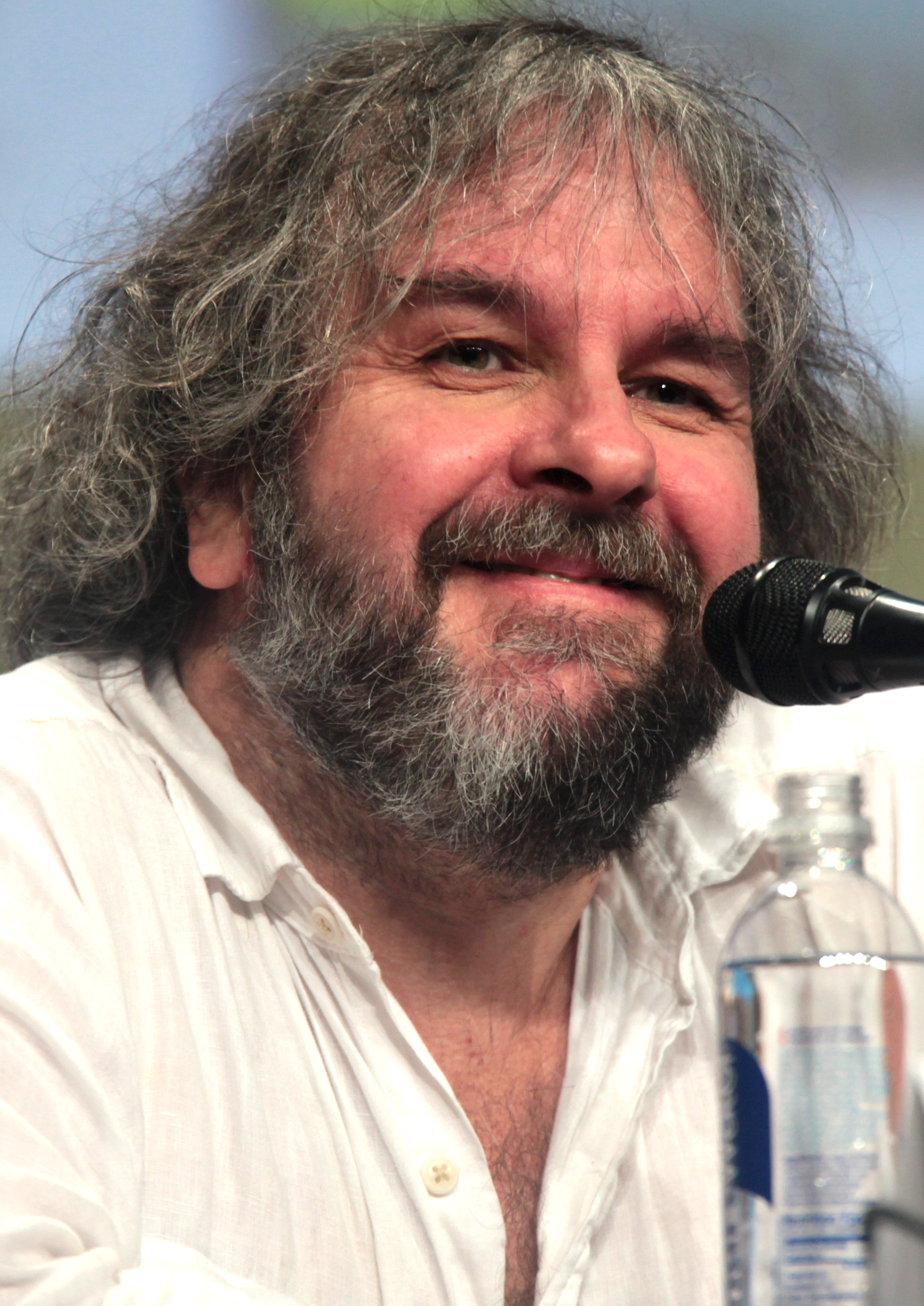
Director Peter Jackson opposed the development

The development has had opposition from other parties. Director Peter Jackson opposed the development, describing it as a "precious green space" threatened by "Soviet-era apartments". He threatened legal action over the issue.

The lobby group Enterprise Miramar cited concerns such as traffic safety and congestion in their opposition. Mayor Andy Foster has said that the council needs to investigate road capacity and safety associated with the project. Wellington City Council has previously voted to cap its share of infrastructure for the development at $10m. A December 2020 article reported that the council had already spent over $800,000 on legal fees and consultants over the development issue.

=== Request for central Government support ===
In 2020 the central Government announced a $3 billion infrastructure fund to restart New Zealand's economy following the coronavirus pandemic. Ian Cassels applied to the fund, saying the Shelly Bay project was "shovel-ready", while lawyers for Fran Walsh and Peter Jackson implored Government ministers to reject the application. Ultimately the Shelly Bay project did not receive any such funding.

=== Groundbreaking ===
A groundbreaking ceremony was held in January 2023 to signal the start of work on the development.

=== Cancellation ===
The project was announced as aborted in September 2023, and the land was sold to Peter Jackson and Fran Walsh. Jackson and Walsh said the area is a "wonderful coastline that holds a great deal of cultural and historical significance", and added "we are looking forward to restoring the natural beauty of the bay." Journalist Tom Hunt attributed the failure of the development to rising construction costs and interest rates, exacerbated by the fire. He estimated that the project, which would have cost $500 million when Cassels first proposed it, would have been $720 million or more in 2023. Hunt's sources suggested that Jackson and Walsh paid $39 million for the land.
