= Miramar Peninsula =

Land in Wellington city, New Zealand

Native name: Te Motu Kairangi
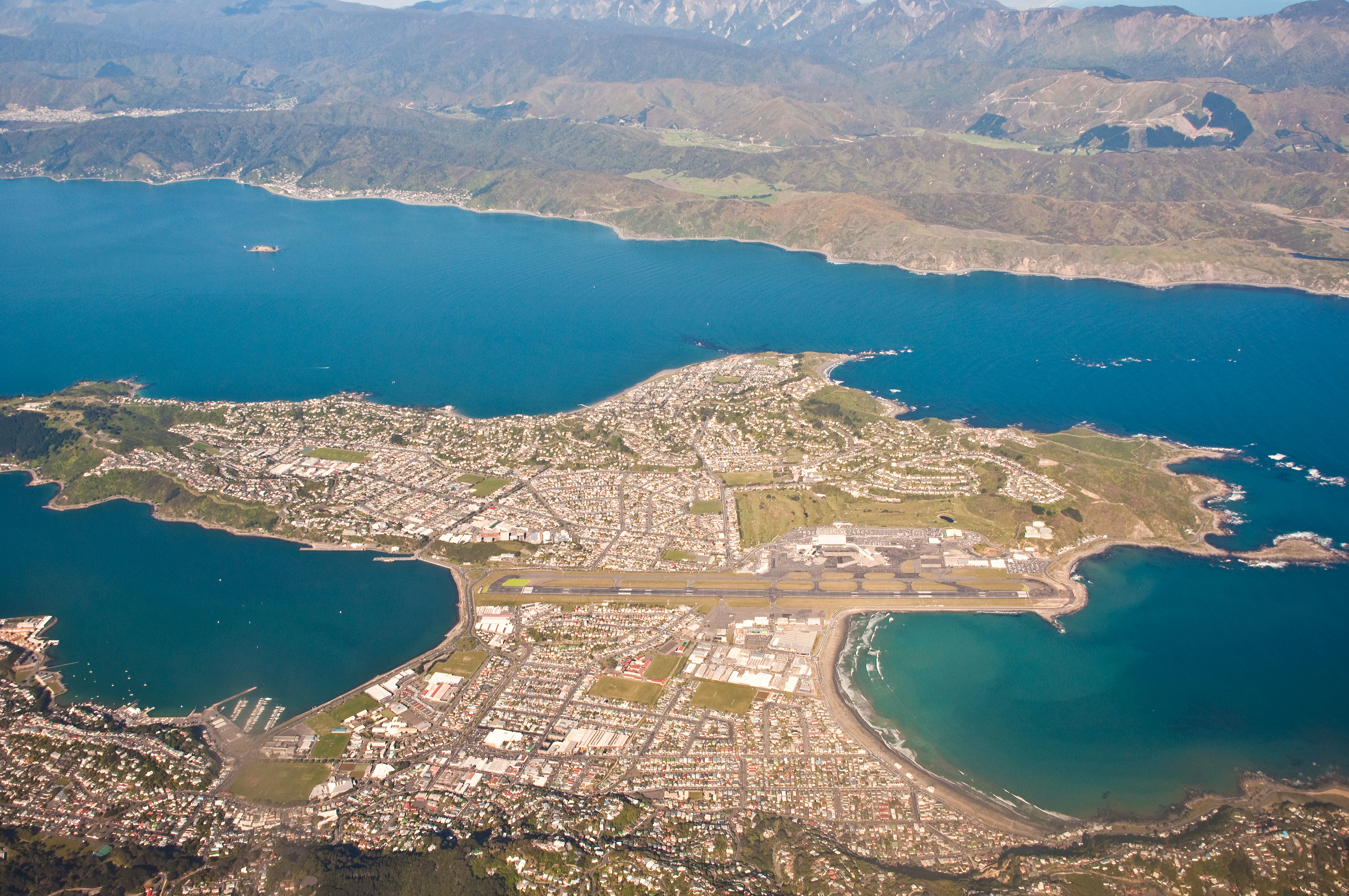
- Wellington Airport at centre, with Miramar Peninsula beyond
- Interactive map of Miramar Peninsula
- Etymology: Spanish for "sea view"

Geography
- Coordinates: 41.320°S 174.823°E
- Area: 21.2 km^{2} (8.2 sq mi)
- Length: 7 km (4.3 mi)
- Width: 2.5 km (1.55 mi)
- Coastline: 19.8 km (12.3 mi)
- Highest elevation: 163 m (535 ft)
- Highest point: Mount Crawford

Administration
- New Zealand
- Region: Wellington Region
- City: Wellington
- Suburbs: Miramar, Maupuia, Strathmore, Seatoun

Demographics
- Population: 19,230 (2022)
- Pop. density: 907/km^{2} (2349/sq mi)

The Miramar Peninsula (Māori: Te Motu Kairangi, officially Te Motu Kairangi / Miramar Peninsula) is a large peninsula on the southeastern side of the city of Wellington, New Zealand. It is located at the entrance to Wellington Harbour, in Wellington's eastern suburbs. According to Māori legend, it was formed at the same time that the taniwha Whaitaitai beached at nearby Hataitai as he tried to escape the confines of the harbour. It contains the large suburbs of Miramar, Maupuia, Seatoun and Strathmore Park and several smaller suburbs.

== Geography ==
The peninsula was originally an island, separated from the main island (Te Ika a Māui) by a sea channel called Te Awa-a-Taia (the channel of Taia). The peninsula area later became known as Hataitai or Whataitai. Around 1460 AD an earthquake named "Haowhenua" (earth swallower) raised the land, eliminating the shallow channel and joining the island to the mainland by an isthmus where Rongotai and Lyall Bay are now. There was a flat plain and freshwater lake in the centre of the peninsula. The lake was first called "Te Rotokura" (red lagoon) and later "Para". When Pākehā settled they named this lagoon "Burnham Water". The lake was later drained.

Northwards, the peninsula juts into Wellington Harbour. To the south are Cook Strait and the South Pacific Ocean. The suburbs of Lyall Bay, Rongotai, Kilbirnie and Hataitai lie to the west across the isthmus. To the east a narrow stretch of water connects Wellington Harbour with Cook Strait and the open sea; beyond this channel are the scrubby Eastbourne hills, and the high and forested Ōrongorongo Ranges. From the peninsula's high points, an observer can look north to the Hutt Valley and the Tararua Ranges, or southwest across Cook Strait, to the high peaks of the Inland and Seaward Kaikōura Ranges, which are often snowbound in winter.

The peninsula has an area of 800 hectares (2,000 acres). The coastline is rocky, with many coves, steep cliffs, and small pinnacles and caves, but there are also sweeping and sandy beaches, notably at Breaker Bay, Worser Bay, Scorching Bay, Moa Point and Tarakena Bay. A high ridge running on an approximate north–south axis forms the spine of the peninsula, with high points Mount Crawford in the north and Beacon Hill in the south. The peninsula has a large area of low-lying land, the Miramar flats, and a smaller area of flat land at Seatoun, both of which are mainly covered in residential housing.

The peninsula is largely urbanised, with large suburbs of Miramar, Maupuia, Strathmore and Seatoun, and narrow strips of houses along the coast at Breaker Bay, Karaka Bay and Moa Point. The urban area is a mix of suburban housing, retail outlets, schools, light and service industries, recreation grounds (such as a golf course and sports fields), and Wellington Airport. There are also extensive areas of regenerating native bush, pine forest, and remnant farmland, as well as urban gardens. A narrow two-lane road circles the peninsula, providing a picturesque route around the many bays, coves and headlands.

At the entrance to Wellington Harbour, the rocks of Barrett Reef lie close to the shore of the peninsula. On 10 April 1968 TEV Wahine, an inter-island ferry, foundered on Barrett Reef and later capsized near Steeple Rock, a pinnacle just off Seatoun. 53 people were killed.

=== Climate ===
The peninsula is exposed to Wellington's prevailing northwest wind and the southerly wind. During southerly storms, big waves and swells batter the peninsula's rocky southern shore. The peninsula's topography, with its high ridges and small bays and coves, provides shelter from the wind in many places. On 15 August 2011, during a prolonged southerly storm, snow fell across the peninsula in the late morning, settling in light drifts on trees, streets and fields. Like other parts of Wellington, snowfall at sea level is a very rare occurrence.

== Landmarks ==
=== Massey Memorial ===
The marble mausoleum of Prime Minister William Massey (1856–1925) sits on a headland at Point Halswell at the northern tip of the peninsula. It can be accessed along a short walking track from Massey Road.

=== Atatürk Memorial ===
A plinth on a cliff overlooking Tarakena Bay and Cook Strait commemorates Mustafa Kemal Atatürk, founder of the Republic of Turkey, who led Turkish troops in action against New Zealand soldiers at Gallipoli in the First World War.

=== Wellington Blown Away sign ===
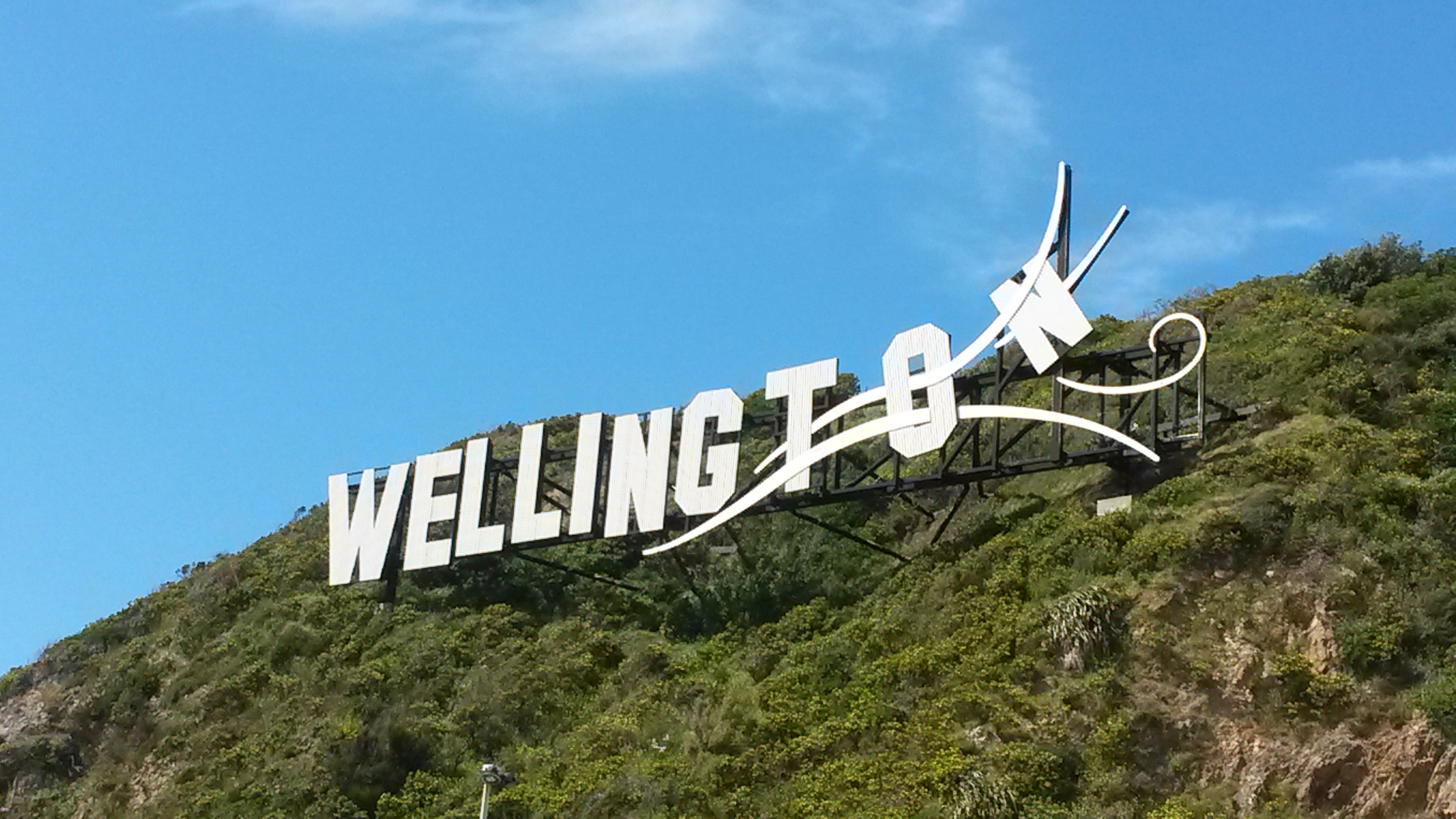
'Wellington Blown Away' sign near the Cutting.

A sign on a hill near the Miramar Cutting spells out 'Wellington' with the last few letters looking as if they are blowing away in Wellington's famous winds. Originally Wellington Airport announced it would install a sign saying 'Wellywood', referencing the area's film industry, but this proposal was not popular so a competition was created by the airport and promoted by the Dominion Post newspaper. The winner of the design competition was 'Wellington Blown Away', designed by Matt Sellars and Raymond McKay of Saatchi and Saatchi. The sign was installed in 2012, and is intended to be seen from the air when landing from the north at Wellington Airport.

=== Mt Crawford Prison ===
Wellington Prison, commonly known as Mt Crawford Prison, was located at the top of Mt Crawford, a peak on the ridge of hills forming a spine at the north end of the Miramar peninsula. The prison was opened in 1927 to replace the Victorian-era Terrace Gaol and was fully occupied by 1929. The prison included a gallows and four men were hanged there, all in the 1930s. The prison closed in 2012. LINZ took over management of the 11.7-hectare (29-acre) site, which is owned by the Defence Force and the Department of Corrections, but as of 2021 nothing had been done with it and the building remained derelict and the site a dumping ground for rubbish. In 2019 there was a proposal by Taranaki Whānui – the commercial arm of the Port Nicholson Block Settlement Trust – to build 300 homes on the site. However a group of Taranaki Whānui members known as Mau Whenua opposed the housing development, saying they believe the land is sacred. In 2021 preliminary geotechnical drilling investigation was done at the site. A community garden was established in 2012 in the grounds of the prison after it closed.

== Access and transport links ==
Cobham Drive is the main road connecting Miramar peninsula with the rest of Wellington city. It was built on land reclaimed during the construction of Wellington Airport in the 1950s and runs past the north end of the airport runway, at the head of Evans Bay. The only other road access to the peninsula is via a road from Lyall Bay at the south end of the airport.

Several bus routes run between Miramar peninsula and the city via Cobham Drive, with express buses at peak times.

A tunnel for pedestrians and cyclists runs on a west–east axis beneath the runway, from Miro Street in Miramar to Coutts Street in Rongotai. Coutts Street was formerly the main road and tram route between Kilbirnie and the Miramar Peninsula, but the street was cut in two when the new airport runway was built.

A cycle path runs from Miramar to the central city, starting at Burnham Wharf and continuing along Cobham Drive, Evans Bay Parade and Oriental Parade.

A modern ferry service across the harbour from Days Bay to Seatoun operated for a few years from 2006, but stopped when passenger numbers declined and the ferry company bought a new ferry that was too big for Seatoun Wharf.

== Recreation ==
The peninsula has several sports clubs: Miramar Rangers, a semi-professional football club, founded in 1907; Seatoun AFC, an amateur football club founded in 1909; and Oriental Rongotai Football Club ('Ories'), an amateur rugby club formed in 1888. Miramar Rangers and Team Wellington operate from David Farrington Park, previously known as Centennial Park. Ories is based at the former polo grounds.

A bowling club and tennis club are also located on the peninsula. The Eastern Suburbs Cricket Club, in nearby Kilbirnie, covers junior and senior cricketers on the peninsula.

The Eastern Walkway is a 2.5 km walking track that traverses the main ridge at the southeast of the peninsula, from the Pass of Branda to Tarakena Bay.

The Worser Bay Boating Club, founded in 1926, offers sailing courses and racing from its base at Worser Bay.

== History ==
=== Māori history ===
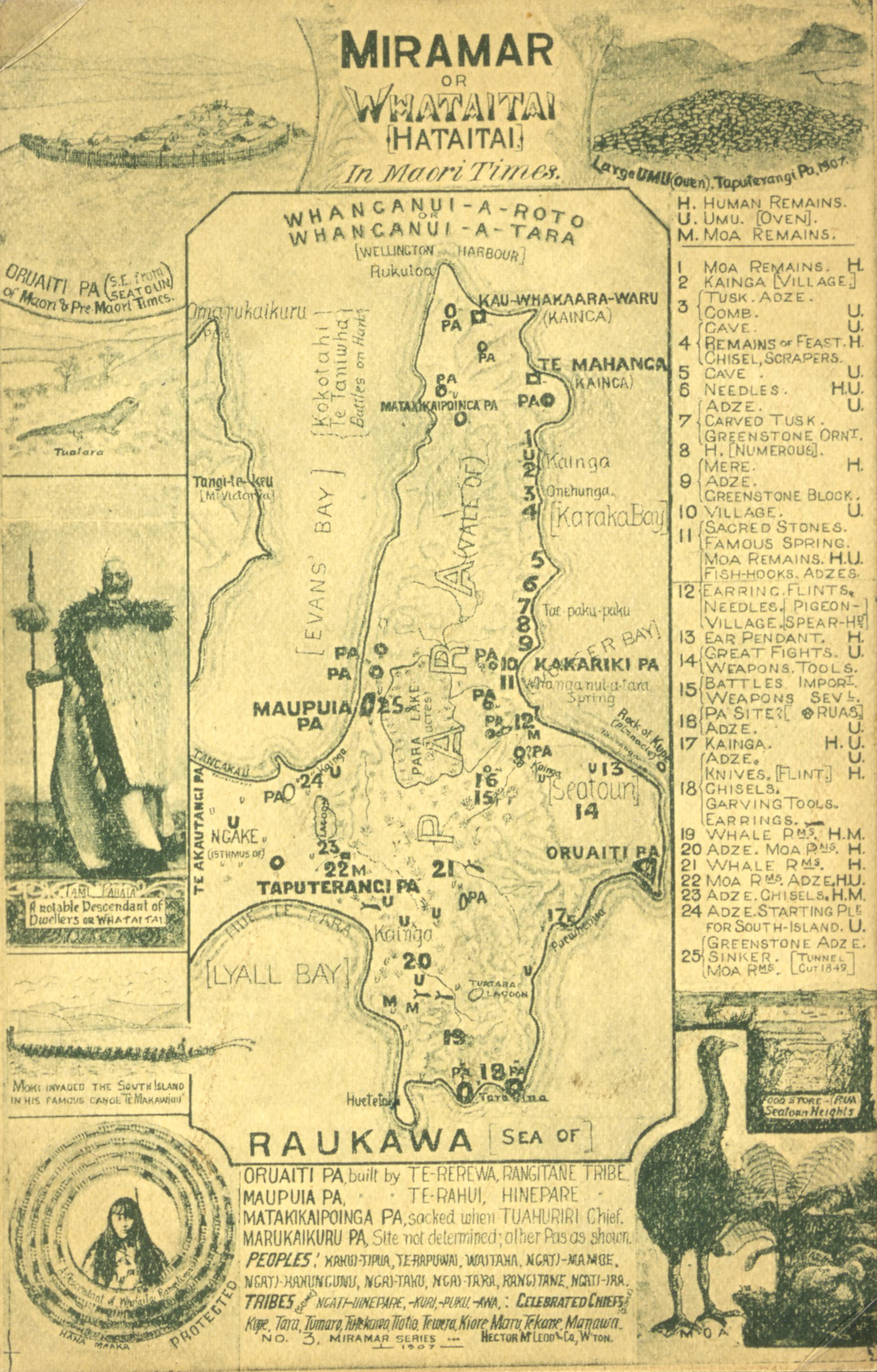
McLeod's 1907 map of Miramar Peninsula showing former sites of Māori occupation

The Māori name for the area when it was still an island was Māori: Te Motu Kairangi (meaning "esteemed" or "precious" island). According to Māori oral legend The island was first settled c.950 AD when legendary explorer Kupe arrived. Kupe landed near what is now Seatoun, and a large rock near the shore is known as Te Ure-o-Kupe (Kupe's penis) or Te Aroaro-o-Kupe (Kupe's presence). The area was home to multiple tribes, namely: Ngai Tara, Rangitane, Ngati Kahungungu, Ngai Tahu, Mua Upoko, Ngāti Ira, and Te Ati Awa.

Ngai Tara were the first to settle on the island and built the first pā, named Whetu Kairangi (bountiful stars) on the hill overlooking Worser Bay. Wellington Harbour Whanganui-a-Tara (harbour of Tara) was named for Tara.

Ngai Tahu lived on the peninsula on their long multi-generation migration southwards. They occupied pā already built as well as building their own.

With the water channel in the east gone following the Haowhenua earthquake around 1460 AD, more fortifications and defensive pā were needed. Many pā (fortified settlements) and kainga (villages) existed over many centuries with many changes, and include the following:

- Kakariki-hutia Pā (built by Ngāti Ira) overlooking modern-day Awa Road
- Kau-whakaara-waru or Kai-tawharo on the east side of Point Halswell
- Mahanga (Te Mahanga Pā) near Kau Bay and above Mahanga Bay
- Manu-kai-kura, a kainga in the small bay north of Shelly Bay
- Mataki-kai-poinga on the western hill below Mount Crawford was originally built by Ngāti Kaitangata (a hapu of Ngāti Ira under their chief Tuahitiri and later occupied by Ngai Tahu under their chief TioTio
- Maupuia Pā, a stockaded village built by Ngāti Hinepare, a hapu of Ngāti Kahungnunu on the narrow part of Rongotai Ridge near the Wellington sign/Miramar cutting today
- Oruaiti Pā (the place of the small pit) built by Te Rerewa of Rangitane on the ridge at Point Dorset
- Paewhenua, a kainga at Eve Bay west of Breaker Bay
- Poito Pā, a fortified village of Ngāti Ira near the Poti stream at Tarakena Bay near the Atatürk Memorial. It was attacked and burned along with Rangitatau Pa in 1819–1820.
- Puhirangi Pā on the hill about the stream flowing into Scorching Bay on the ridge above Karaka Bay
- Rangitatau Pā was built by Ngai Tara. In pre-European times, people of the Ngai Tara and Ngāti Ira iwi lived here, using the site for fishing in Cook Strait. The pā was located above Seatoun and may have stretched as far as Pilot Hill and over to Lyall Bay. The principal structure at the pā was called "Raukawa" and a fishing rock offshore was called "Te Kai-whatawhata". Rangitatau was the largest pā on the peninsula and was inhabited over many centuries. It was used by people living in nearby Poito pā as a refuge during attacks. In 1819–20, Ngā Puhi and Ngāti Toa raiders sacked the pā at Poito and Rangitatau, and killed, enslaved or drove off their inhabitants.
- Tapu-te-Rangi Pā is recorded on the map by McLeod and on plans by Crawford as being in Kilbirnie but this may be a mistake, as Tapu-te-Ranga is a name for the island in Island Bay.
- Te Whetu-kairangi, a kainga of Ngai Tara and Muaupoko was above Worser Bay
- Paekawakawa Kainga is mentioned on McLeod's map but is believed by later historians to be mistaken for a place of the same name in Island Bay.

=== Captain Cook's arrival ===
Captain James Cook anchored off the coast near Miramar on his first visit to New Zealand and mapped much of the coastline but didn't record the harbour entrance. On his second voyage to New Zealand he noted the entrance to Wellington Harbour and attempted unsuccessfully to enter it. His diary entry reads:

November 2, 1773. We discovered on the east side of Cape Teerawhitte a new inlet I had never observed before. Being tired with beating against the N.W. winds, I resolved to put into this place, if I found it practicable, or to anchor in the bay which lies before it ……… At one o'clock we reached the entrance of the inlet, just as the tide of ebb was making out; the wind likewise against us, we anchored in twelve fathoms water, the bottom a fine sand. The easternmost of the Black Rocks, which lie on the larboard side of the entrance of the inlet, bore N. by E. one mile distant; Cape Teerawhitte, or the west point of the bay, west, distant about two leagues; and the east point of the bay N. by E. four or five miles.

Soon after we had anchored, several of the natives came off in their canoes; two from one shore, and one from the other. It required but little address to get three or four of them on board. These people were extravagantly fond of nails above every other thing. To one man I gave two cocks and two hens, which he received with so much indifference as gave me little hopes he would take proper care of them.

We had not been at anchor here above two hours, before the wind veered to N.E., with which we weighed, but the anchor was hardly at the bows before it shifted to south. With this we could but just lead out of the bay.

=== 19th century ===
==== Musket wars and the fall of Rangitatau ====
Rangitatau was sacked and destroyed in late 1819–1820, in an attack led by Tuwharetoa. The first people killed at the pā were working in nearby kumara fields. In all some 50 people died. Historian Henry Maynard Christie recorded in 1899 that the burned totara palisades of the pā were then still in the ground.

The land of Miramar was held by Te Āti Awa 20 years later when the Treaty of Waitangi was signed in 1840. Christie also mentions that Māori brought eels from Heretaunga (Hutt River) and kept them in the lake on the peninsula as a stock of food.

==== Farming and early development ====
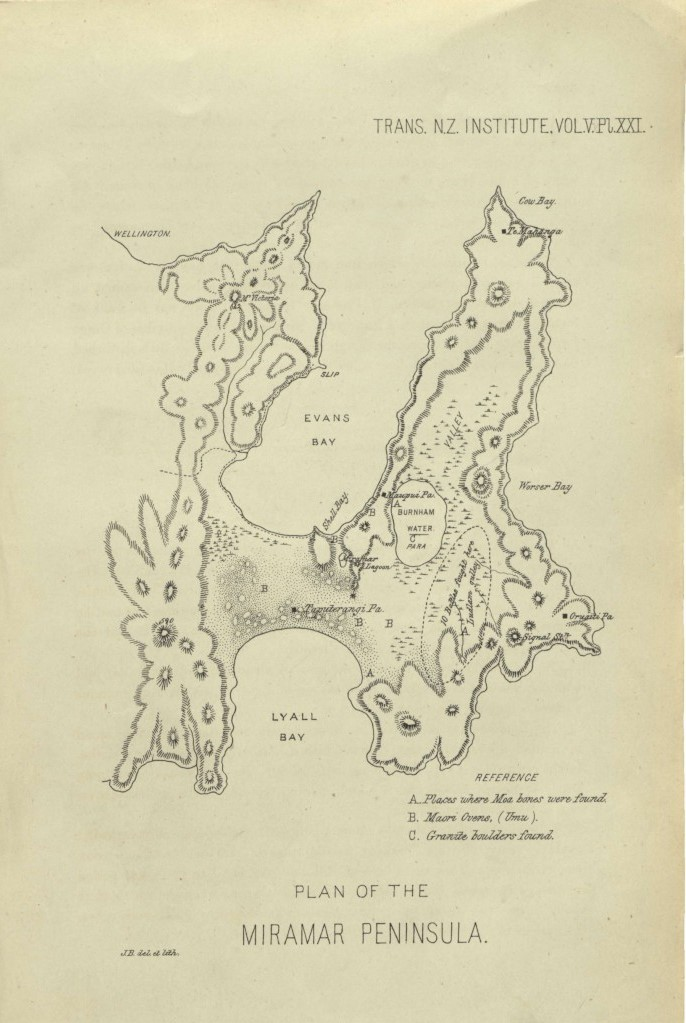
1872 map of Miramar Peninsula, showing the location of Burnham Water and surrounding swampy area.

James Coutts Crawford arrived in Wellington in 1839 and purchased five land orders from The New Zealand Company for 1,300 guineas, which included five acres of town land and 5,000 acres of country land, thus acquiring most of the Miramar peninsula which was then known as Watts Peninsula. He later bought the remaining portions from other landowners, eventually owning the whole of the peninsula.

The centre of the peninsula contained a shallow lake, known to Māori as Para or Te Roto Kura, and to Europeans as Burnham Water, which was surrounded by swamps. Crawford established his cattle farm at the north end of the lake and named it 'Glendavar'. Crawford wrote in 1840 that the hills were "chiefly clothed with the common fern mixed with flax" and described the lake: "the flat may be said to have been chiefly occupied by water spread over about 200 acres of central area, and the water from it extended up the large swamps both to the north and south". In 1847, Crawford built what may have been the first tunnel in New Zealand, to drain the lake into Evans Bay. He enlarged the tunnel and did further drainage work on the swamps in 1859. The tunnel through Rongotai ridge is still there north of the 'Wellington' sign on Shelly Bay Road. Crawford sowed various types of grasses to fix the sand in parts of the peninsula and improve the former swampy areas. The former lake later became the site of the Miramar shopping area.

In 1868, Crawford's brother-in-law Major McBarnet built a house which he named 'Miramar', at the south-east of Evans Bay. In 1872, Crawford proposed changing the name of the peninsula from Watts Peninsula to Miramar, and around this time moved from the city to live in McBarnet's house.

In 1878, Crawford put up for sale 100 acres of land divided into 200 sections at his new "Township of Seatoun". Roads had already been laid out and "partially formed", with allowance for future tram lines, and land was set aside for churches, schools and parks. In 1886, the Government took 245 acres of Crawford's land at the Evans Bay side of the peninsula for defence purposes. This became the Shelly Bay base.

Another farm on the peninsula in the 1840s was 'Tetcott', owned by Francis Molesworth and situated in the south east corner of the plain.

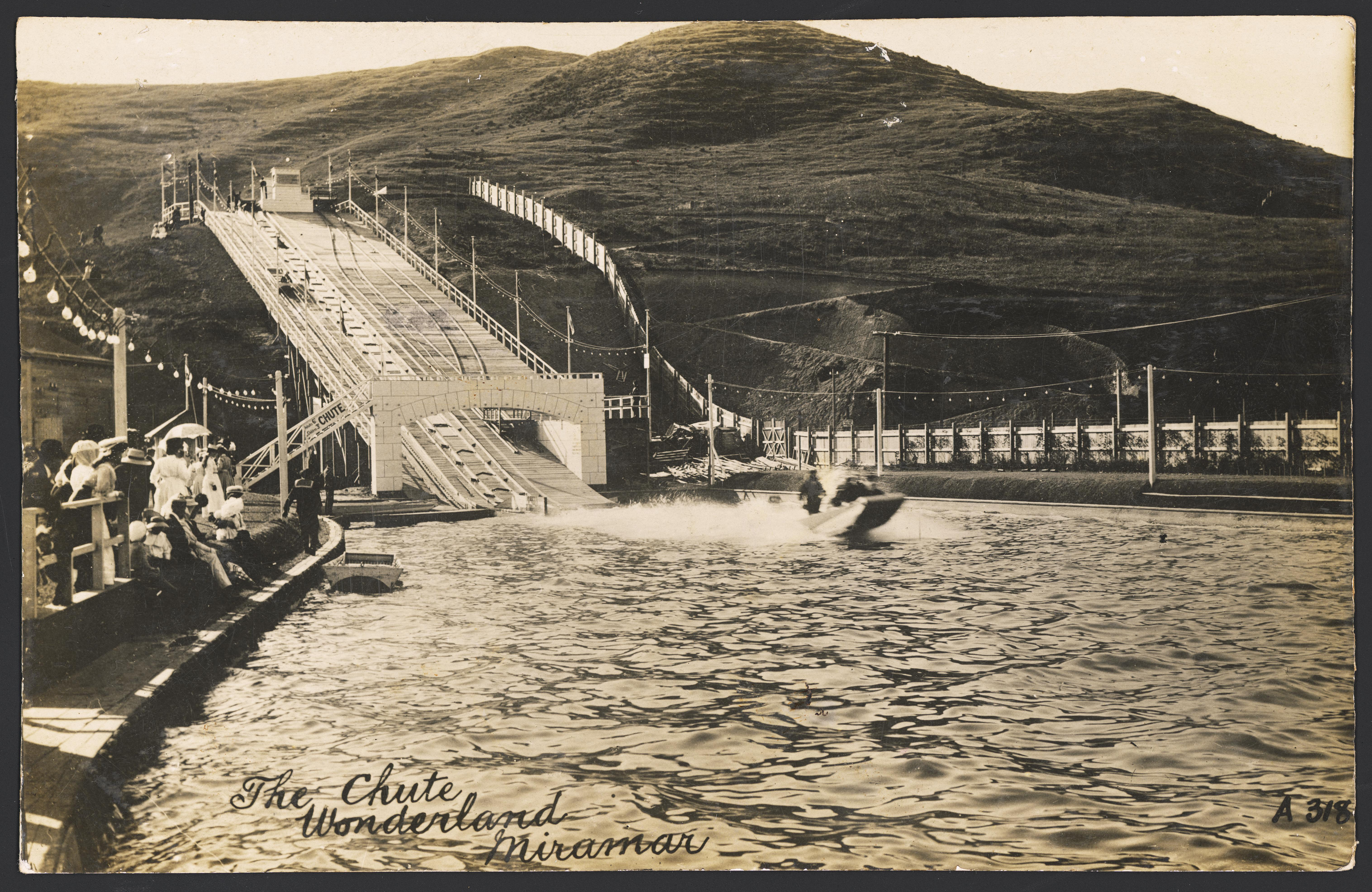
The chute, Wonderland

==== Early recreational use ====
New Zealand's first permanent racecourse was created in 1847 in Miramar "between Burnham Water and Lyall's Bay", but by 1871 "barely a vestige" of the course remained. In the 1890s almost all the peninsula was still farmland. It was also a popular area for recreation, with visitors driving or riding out from the city for a day's entertainment. There was a hunt club which on at least one occasion attracted 500 spectators, a polo club (established 1894), a golf course (opened 1895) and horse racing. A trotting course was constructed on the isthmus adjacent to the peninsula in 1893.

Wonderland amusement park opened at Miramar North in 1907. It included a Japanese tea-house, distorting mirrors, a helter-skelter and an artificial lake. The park ran into financial troubles in 1910 and was sold to new owners, then shut permanently in 1912.

==== Russian Scare ====
In the 1880s the "Russian Scare" was gripping the nation, with people fearing an invasion by Russia. New Zealand embarked on building fortifications to defend itself from attack by sea. Large coastal artillery fortifications were built at Fort Ballance, Point Halswell and Shelly Bay in 1885.

=== 20th century ===
==== Improved access ====
In the nineteenth and early twentieth century, access to the peninsula was over sand dunes at the Rongotai isthmus. From 1901 to 1913, ferry services operated between Wellington city and wharves at Miramar, Seatoun and Karaka Bay. Ferry services ceased after the roads improved and public transport reached the peninsula. Electric tram services to Miramar North and Seatoun began in 1907.

Seatoun Tunnel, constructed in 1906–1907, greatly improved access to the suburb of Seatoun which was previously only reachable by ferry or bush track. It was funded by the Crawford Family, early owners of much of the Miramar peninsula, and provided pedestrian, tram and vehicle access.

The Cutting was constructed through a low ridge on the peninsula's eastern side in the late 1890s, and widened in 1910. It provides a thoroughfare from Cobham Drive to Miramar Avenue and central Miramar.

==== Miramar Borough ====
In the first years of the 20th century Miramar was still within Hutt County, which encompassed the whole Wellington region south of the Waikanae river, excluding Wellington city. The rates levied by the county in 1902 rose from ¼d per £1 of the property's value up to a new rate of 1d per £1 of value. Very little had been spent in Miramar by the county for the previous decade, and locals expressed their anger at the increased rates, resulting in a reduction back to ¾d per £1. Local resident Charles Crawford (son of James Coutts Crawford) contested this in the Supreme Court, winning a ruling that "the rate charged must be in accordance with service rendered in each Riding". The anger continued when the Hutt County Council threatened to appeal to the Privy Council. A petition was collected among Miramar residents and presented to the Governor, and on 10 November 1904 the Seatoun Road Board District was constituted as a Borough and proclaimed in the New Zealand Gazette. Charles Crawford was subsequently elected the first mayor of Miramar Borough Council. Miramar was not yet linked to Wellington city by road. There were three ferries from Miramar, Karaka Bay and Seatoun wharves. Some early accounts mention a land approach by "rough bullock track" over Constable Street hill over the sand isthmus. Miramar Borough amalgamated with Wellington City on 31 January 1921.

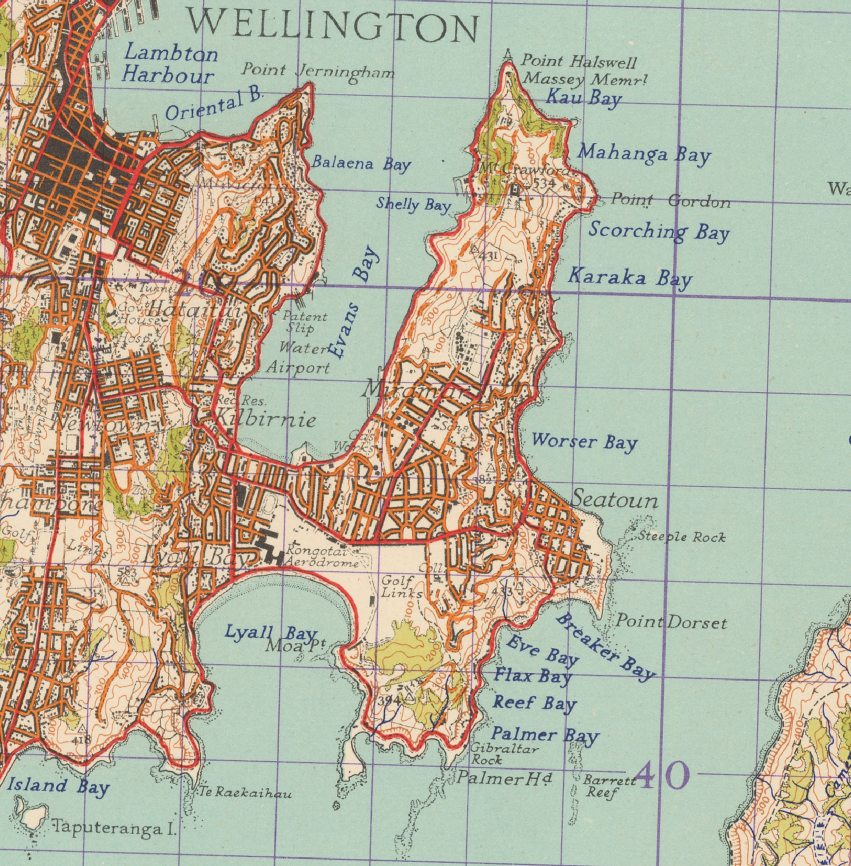
1950s map of Miramar Peninsula before reclamation of Lyall Bay

==== Housing development ====
In the early twentieth century the 'garden city' concept gained popularity in New Zealand and overseas. By the early 1900s Miramar peninsula was being divided into residential sections and advertised as a healthy, open area with wide roads, trees and space around the houses, unlike inner-city areas such as Te Aro which were crowded and disease-ridden. A 1903 advertisement for sections at Miramar North praised the area:

[...] where the fresh air will delight and brace up; where gardens and sheltering trees will turn green fields into expanses of colour and shade; where the conveniences of transit will bring residents within easy distance of the city, and thus enable them to experience the pleasurable freedom of the country, right on the borders of the metropolis. Miramar North is rich in the advantages necessary for a model residential suburb, and has for years past been the favourite rendezvous of thousands bent on releasing themselves from the confines of the city, and enjoying pure air and pleasant prospect. Congestion, now the retarder of ideal home life in Wellington, will not be known at Miramar North.

By 1913 there were 600 quarter-acre sections laid out on Miramar peninsula, including 300 owned by the Miramar North Land Company. These sections had a 66 ft frontage. In 1913 the Miramar Borough Council proposed a bylaw which would allow frontages of only 33 ft: this would enable owners of the wide sections to divide their properties in half lengthwise. The proposal was swiftly withdrawn after heavy criticism since the peninsula was valued as a spacious garden suburb.

In 1920 the Housing Department built 108 workers' dwellings, mostly in concrete, in the area around Broadway and Scots College, and in 1921 a Labour Department housing scheme was laid out nearby, with planning for wide roads, parks and retail areas. The suburb of Strathmore Park was named in 1928 as streets were formed for another new housing area of 529 sites. Advertisements boasted that Strathmore Park was the new garden suburb, "bathed in sunshine the livelong day".

New Zealand's first state house was built at 7 Fife Lane Miramar in 1937. Prime Minister Michael Joseph Savage and several cabinet ministers helped to carry in the furniture of Wellington bus conductor David McGregor and his wife Mary on 18 September 1937.

In the nineteenth century, the only public school in the eastern suburbs was Kilbirnie School, opened in Hataitai in 1884. Schools opened on the Miramar Peninsula as the population there increased: Worser Bay School (1897), Seatoun School (1916), Miramar South School (1917), Miramar Central School (1929), Miramar North School (1939) and Strathmore Park School (1947).

==== Prohibition of alcohol ====
Wellington East District, which had boundaries broadly similar to the Miramar electorate and its predecessors, encompassing the whole of Miramar Peninsula and Rongotai, was 'dry' from 1909 until 1993. This meant that alcohol could not be sold in a public place anywhere in the district – there were no licensed restaurants, bars or bottle shops on the peninsula. In 1935 the district was one of only 12 nationwide that remained dry, and as late as 1990 Wellington East was the only part of Wellington and one of only five districts in New Zealand voting to remain dry after the new Sale of Liquor Act (1989) had liberalised rules about alcohol sales in supermarkets. Apart from a bar at the airport, the nearest public bar was at Greta Point in Evans Bay. At the 1993 election the electorate voted to go 'wet', i.e. to allow the sale of alcohol. In September 1994, residents voted on whether to give control of alcohol sales to a licensing trust, which would have a monopoly on alcohol sales in the area, or to allow private enterprises to sell alcohol. 59% voted for private enterprise. This allowed alcohol sellers and bars to open on the peninsula.

==== Industry ====
Wellington Gas Company bought 14 acres of land at the intersection of Miramar Avenue and Southampton Road and in 1908 installed what was then New Zealand's biggest gasometer. A gasworks complex to serve Wellington was built during 1911–1912 after the Cutting was constructed in 1910, and in 1912 a tramway was built from Miramar Wharf through the Cutting to the gasworks so that coal could be quickly unloaded and transported. After natural gas from Kapuni was introduced to Wellington in 1971, the Miramar gasworks was no longer needed. The gasworks were demolished soon after and in 1972 the site was sold into private ownership. Peter Jackson's Stone Street Studios bought land at the site in 1997.

A brickworks was built in Ira Street in Miramar around 1923. The company made bricks, pipes and chimney pots: bricks from this factory were used to build Wellington railway station in 1937. The streets of Miramar were lined with red bricks as curbing. Some brick curbs still remain in south Miramar streets and along Ruahine Street in Hataitai. The plant closed in 1968 after the land was rezoned as residential, and the buildings were demolished in 1969–1970. All that remains of the brickworks site is a brick wall lining Ira street.

New Zealand Electric Lamp Manufacturers (ZELMA) set up a factory at Tauhinu Road in Miramar in 1940. At its peak the business produced 13 million lightbulbs per year, manufactured from components imported from America, Europe and Australia. ZELMA closed in 1999 and the building was demolished soon after. The site is now occupied by townhouses.

=== 21st century ===
Film director Peter Jackson has based his film production empire in Miramar, with studios, sound stages, and pre- and post-production facilities. Stone Street Studios was established at the former gasworks site. Weta Workshop, involved in many movies directed by Jackson, such as The Lord of the Rings film trilogy, King Kong, and The Hobbit, is also in Miramar.

In early November 2023, Miramar Peninsula was declared pest free. This was the result of 11,000 bait stations, 450 cameras, and the work of 20,000 Miramar residents. This resulted in a 71% increase in birdlife since the project began.

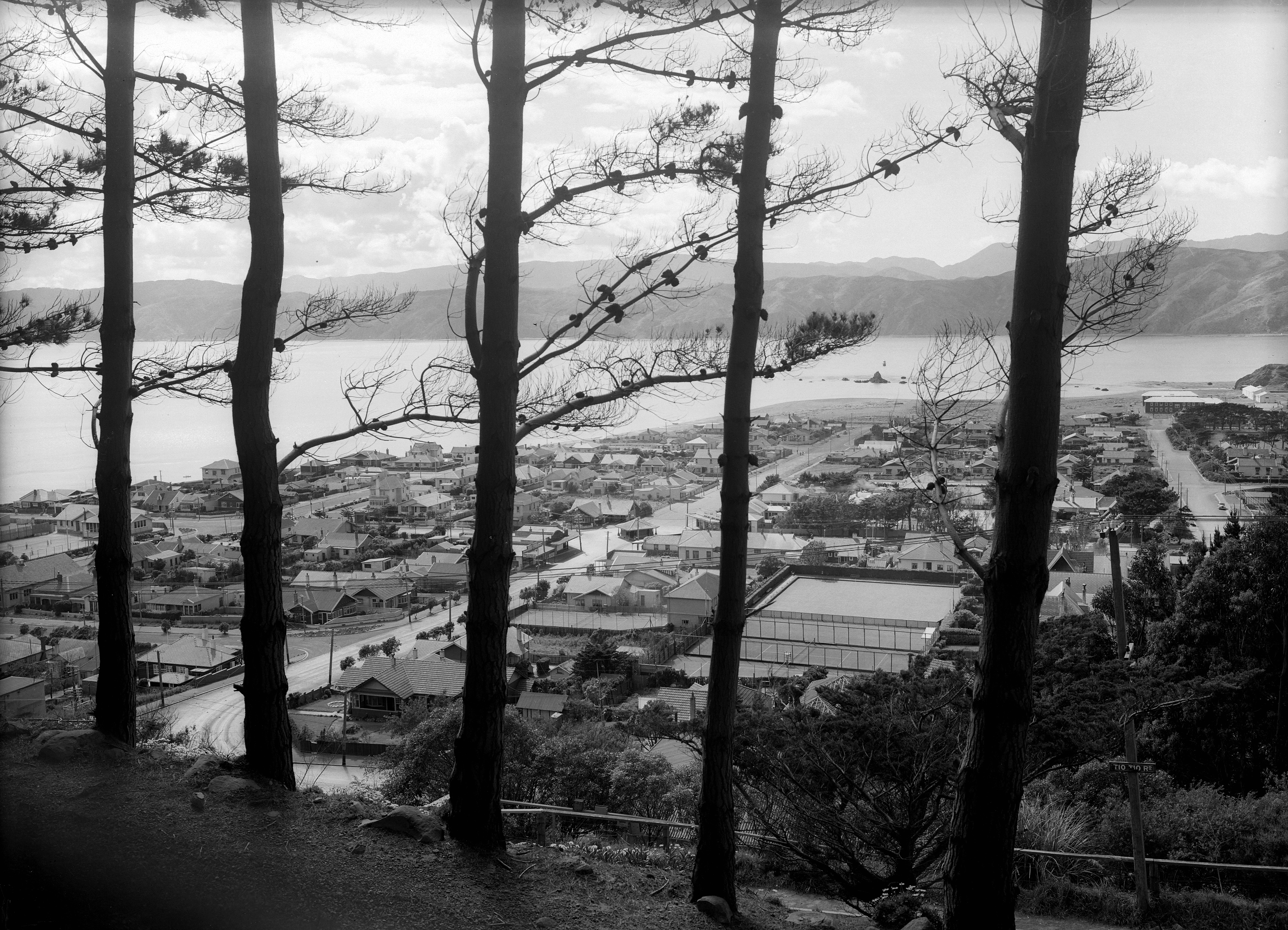
Looking over Seatoun towards Te Ure o Kupe rock, circa 1938–39

=== Communication and defence ===
Its hilly topography and position overlooking Cook Strait and the entrance to Wellington Harbour have historically made the Miramar Peninsula strategically important for communication and defence purposes. Early Māori built their settlements on hills and ridges so that they could identify visitors from a long way off. Until World War 2 the peninsula was still an important component of an evolving coastal defence system, designed to protect the capital, harbour and hinterland from naval attack. The advent of naval air power made these coastal fortifications largely redundant, because an enemy could carry out aerial attacks using planes launched from aircraft carriers well beyond the range of even the largest shore-based guns.

==== Beacon Hill signal station ====
In 1866 a signal station was moved from Mount Albert to Beacon Hill at the southeast of the peninsula, overlooking the harbour mouth. The signallers would put up flags to signal ships or send messages to another station on Mount Victoria. A modern signal station still operates from Beacon Hill, communicating with vessels at sea and liaising with CentrePort who manage Wellington's port facilities.

==== Fort Ballance ====
During the 1870s and 1880s there were fears of war with Russia, later known as 'The Russian Scare'. In 1885 the government built Fort Ballance at Point Gordon, the former site of Te Mahanga Pā, on the northeast coast of the peninsula above Mahanga Bay. It was intended to protect Wellington from possible naval attack. Fort Ballance was the premier fort in the Wellington area for 26 years (1885–1911). It was used by the military until 1945, and is listed as a Historic Place Category 1 by Heritage New Zealand. The 1880s layout of Fort Ballance is largely unaltered and a good impression of the original nineteenth century fort remains. The fort is a permanent reminder of the technology used in the coastal defence network of the 1880s and it is an early example of the use of concrete as a building material. A wharf was built in Mahanga Bay in 1886 to support the fort. The wharf was demolished in 1966.

==== Point Halswell ====
Point Halswell at the northern tip of the peninsula was originally known as Rukutoa and was the site of a pā named Kai-tawharo. In 1841 the government took the land, and in 1885 built the Halswell Battery and barracks to protect Wellington from possible Russian invasion. From 1913 the barracks was used as a women's prison and the fort was disarmed and converted to storage for ammunition. In 1925 the site was converted into a memorial for Prime Minister William Massey. The gun pit was lined with marble to become a vault for Massey and his wife. The lower level of the military fort still exists beneath the memorial. In World War 2 the site was again used for defence purposes: an observation post was built above the memorial.

During World War 2, six Heavy Anti-aircraft Artillery (HAA) gun emplacements were built around Wellington. One of these sites was at Point Halswell, about 250 m south of the Massey Memorial.

==== Kau Point Battery ====
The Kau Point Battery was constructed in 1891 to support Fort Ballance. It had an eight-inch disappearing gun to protect the harbour. The gun was removed in 1922, and the site fell into disuse after World War 2. It has a Historic Place Category 1 listing from Heritage New Zealand.

==== Shelly Bay ====
The government took land at Shelly Bay for an anti-submarine mine depot in 1885, in response to the 'Russian Scare'. In 1907, the Royal Navy took charge of Shelly Bay and facilities were expanded. The base was expanded significantly during World War 2: there were barracks, workshops, stores, wharves and slipways. After World War 2 Shelly Bay was used by the Royal New Zealand Air Force for accommodation and other purposes. In 1995 the base closed, and in 2009 the land and buildings were transferred to Taranaki Whānui ki Te Upoko o Te Ika as a part of a Treaty of Waitangi settlement. The land was then sold to a developer with plans for it to become the site of a major residential development, but the project was cancelled in September 2023, and the land was sold to Peter Jackson and Fran Walsh.

==== Fort Dorset ====
Fort Dorset is a defence site established in 1908 at Point Dorset, the easternmost point of the peninsula and the narrowest part of the entrance to Wellington Harbour. This was also the site of the 17th-century Oruaiti Pā. Fort Dorset consisted of gun batteries, administration and accommodation blocks and a parade ground, and was in use by the army for most of the twentieth century. The military accommodation was closed in 1991 and the camp was demolished in 1998. Remnants of the gun emplacements remain on the hills around the point. In 2002, Seatoun School moved from its previous site and opened in new buildings at Fort Dorset.

==== Palmer Head ====
Palmer Head at the south of the peninsula had been a military reserve since the nineteenth century. A gun battery and accommodation was built there in the 1930s, and a searchlight was installed. Troops were stationed at Palmer Head during World War 2. The site was decommissioned in 1957, the guns were removed in 1960 and structures on the site were demolished in stages between 1962 and 1970. Palmer Head is now a public reserve, apart from a structure which provides navigation and surveillance services for air traffic safety.

==== Anti-mine barrier ====
During World War 2 a steel net hanging from buoys was strung across the harbour from Ward Island to Miramar Peninsula to stop enemy submarines. There was a gate to allow sea traffic to pass, but each vessel had to be checked by the "gate-ship". The net was removed at the end of the war.

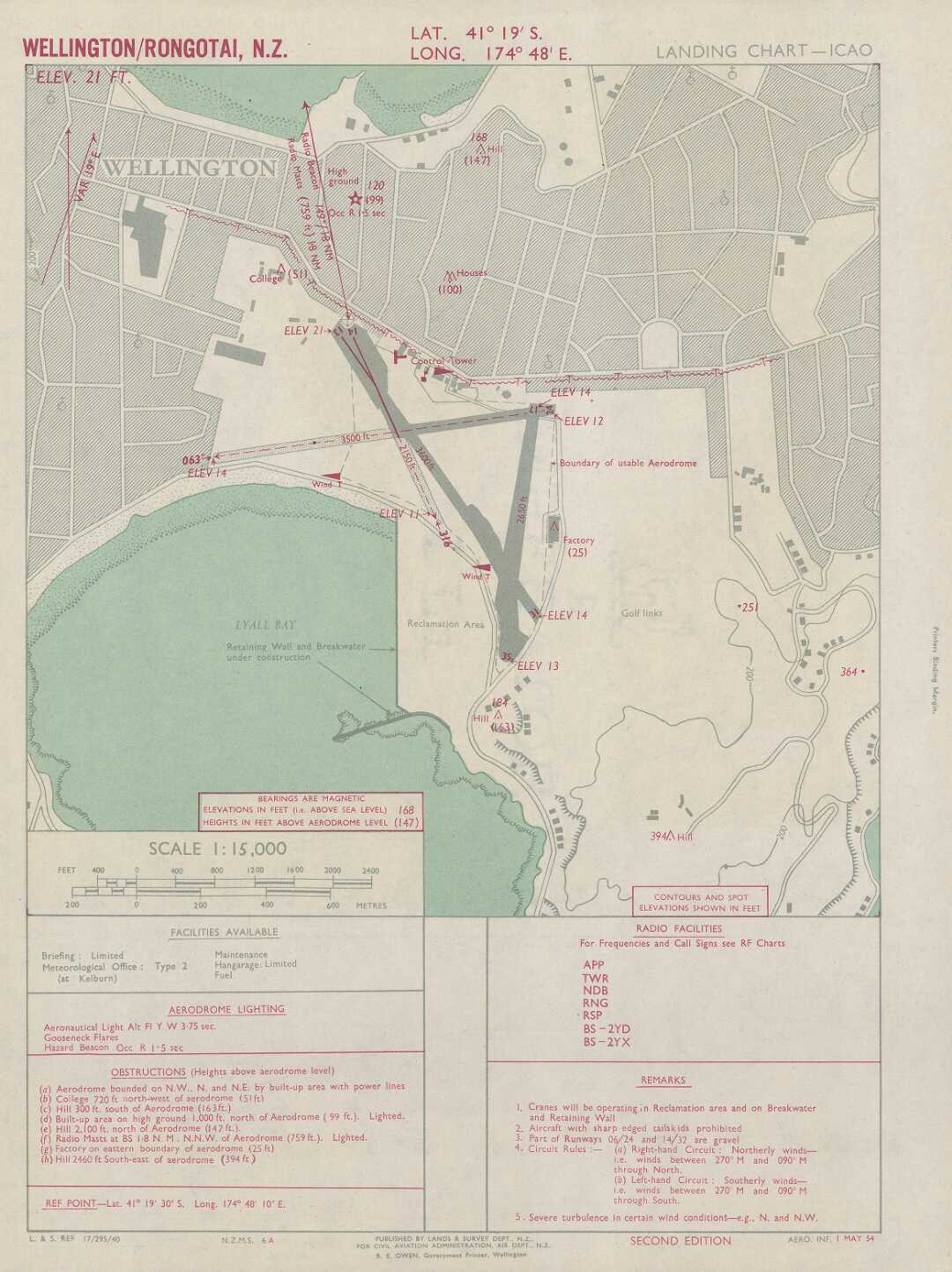
The area around Rongotai Aerodrome in 1954, showing reclamation in Lyall Bay.

=== Rongotai Aerodrome and Wellington Airport ===
Rongotai Aerodrome opened in 1929. This was in approximately the same location as Burger King Miramar is today. Wellington Airport in its current location opened on 24 October 1959, replacing the aerodrome. The airport runway lies north–south along the western side of the peninsula, separating Miramar from Rongotai, Lyall Bay and Kilbirnie. Construction of the new airport in the 1950s included flattening the hill to the west of the Miramar plain (Rongotai Ridge). Spoil from the levelled hill was used to reclaim land from the sea to form Cobham Drive and part of the runway of the new airport. The residential street of Rongotai Terrace which ran along the ridge of the hill was completely removed and all houses shifted or demolished. A headland named Moa Point was subsumed into the southern end of the runway, resulting in the name now only being used to describe remaining houses to the east.
