= 1978 New Zealand bravery awards =

The 1978 New Zealand bravery awards were announced via four Special Honours Lists dated 20 April, 18 May, 13 July, and 2 November 1978, and recognised six people for acts of bravery in 1977 or 1978.

== Queen's Gallantry Medal (QGM) ==
- Inspector Melroy Kenneth Huggard – New Zealand Police.

At about 7.40 p.m. on 2 April 1978 a 22-year-old man, who was in an extremely emotional state after a domestic dispute, left his Miramar home armed with a .308 Brno rifle and a .303 calibre rifle, and ammunition for both. He fired a shot at a passing motor cyclist but just missed him. He then shot and killed an 18-year-old youth who was innocently sitting at a lighted window talking on the telephone. He then fired shots at a woman and at the murdered youth's mother but missed both. Further down the road he discarded the .303 rifle and ammunition.

Constables Borrows and Prins were on patrol duty. Both were unarmed, and although aware that a person had been shot, the circumstances surrounding the incident were unknown to them. On sighting the offender they approached him and, despite being threatened, attempted to apprehend him. Inspector Huggard arrived on the scene, approached the offender and was warned that he would be shot if he came closer. The offender then released the safety catch of the rifle in an attempt to stall Inspector Huggard who, with complete disregard for his own safety, lunged at the offender, knocking the firearm aside and pushing him to the ground. The rifle, on later inspection, contained five live rounds of ammunition in the magazine. It is evident that further loss of life would have resulted if Inspector Huggard had not taken the action he did. He displayed outstanding courage.

The manner in which this extremely dangerous situation was handled by Inspector Huggard and Constables Borrows and Prins is in the highest traditions of the New Zealand Police.

== Queen's Commendation for Brave Conduct ==
- Sapper Laurence Gerald Salmon – 1st Field Squadron, Royal New Zealand Engineers.

During the period 3 to 7 October 1977 Sapper Salmon's unit was engaged on a bridge demolition task at the Waiotukupuna Stream. His particular task involved the gas cutting of the blast exposed reinforcing steel rods. As Sapper Salmon was completing this task the bridge quite unexpectedly started to collapse. This caused a sudden escape of gas from the high pressure oxy-acetylene equipment. Recognising the immediate risk of an explosion, and the danger to others, and with complete disregard for his own safety, Sapper Salmon ran across the moving structure and freed the bottles from the collapsing bridge. He then fell with the bridge into the stream approximately 20 feet below. Sapper Salmon's prompt and courageous action greatly reduced the danger to 15 other soldiers working nearby.

- Sergeant John Halladay Smith – Royal Regiment of New Zealand Artillery, 4th (G) Medium Battery; of Ngāruawāhia.

On 4 December 1977 Sergeant Smith was attending an exercise with his unit at Four-Mile Beach near Raglan. A young woman. visiting the unit as a potential recruit got into difficulties whilst swimming and initial rescue attempts were unsuccessful. At the time there was a heavy surf, and a fierce rip was carrying the woman out to sea. With complete disregard for his own safety Sergeant Smith swam at an oblique angle out beyond the rip and reached the woman. He then returned through the heavy surf with the woman clinging to his back. He succeeded in the rescue despite a bad attack of cramp that left him unable to walk after arrival back at the beach. His courageous action undoubtedly saved the life of the woman.

- Peter Crichton – first officer, Christchurch Prison (Addington), Department of Justice.

For services on the evening of 18 August 1977 when he responded, alone and unarmed, to an emergency call to assist four officers who had been attacked and disabled by four remand prisoners. He himself was attacked and knocked unconscious by the escaping prisoners.

- Constable Kerry James Borrows – New Zealand Police.
- Constable Gerard Prins – New Zealand Police.

At about 7.40 p.m. on 2 April 1978 a 22-year-old man, who was in an extremely emotional state after a domestic dispute, left his Miramar home armed with a .308 Brno rifle and a .303 calibre rifle, and ammunition for both. He fired a shot at a passing motor cyclist but just missed him. He then shot and killed an 18-year-old youth who was innocently sitting at a lighted window talking on the telephone. He then fired shots at a woman and at the murdered youth's mother but missed both. Further down the road he discarded the .303 rifle and ammunition.

Constables Borrows and Prins were on patrol duty. Both were unarmed, and although aware that a person had been shot, the circumstances surrounding the incident were unknown to them. On sighting the offender they approached him and, despite being threatened, attempted to apprehend him. Inspector Huggard arrived on the scene, approached the offender and was warned that he would be shot if he came closer. The offender then released the safety catch of the rifle in an attempt to stall Inspector Huggard who, with complete disregard for his own safety, lunged at the offender, knocking the firearm aside and pushing him to the ground. The rifle, on later inspection, contained five live rounds of ammunition in the magazine. It is evident that further loss of life would have resulted if Inspector Huggard had not taken the action he did. He displayed outstanding courage.

The manner in which this extremely dangerous situation was handled by Inspector Huggard and Constables Borrows and Prins is in the highest traditions of the New Zealand Police.

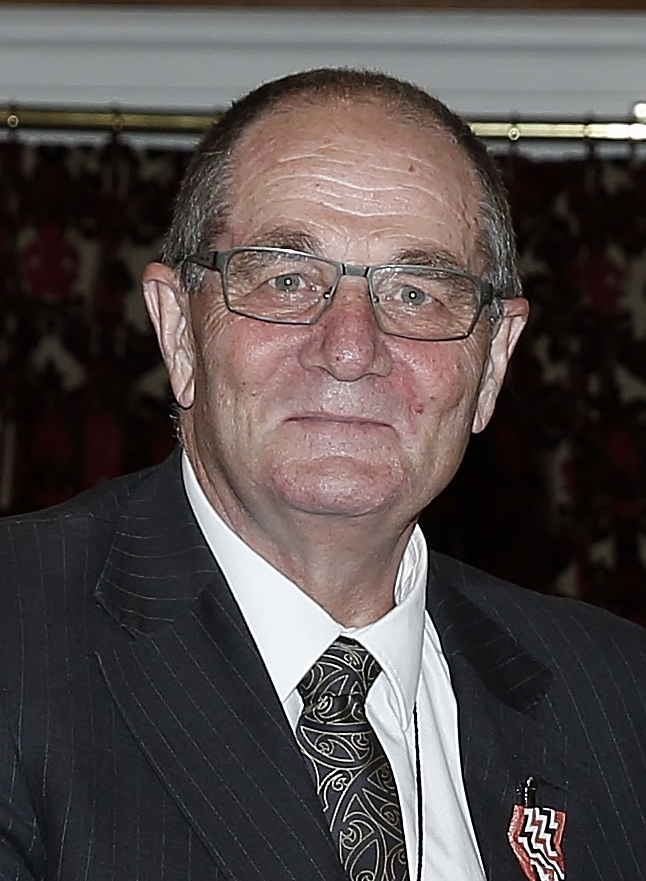
Chester Borrows
