= Mount Crawford (New Zealand) =

Coordinates: 41°17′40″S 174°49′43″E

Mount Crawford is the highest point of the Miramar Peninsula on the North Island of New Zealand. Mount Crawford was first purchased by James Coutts Crawford. In the 1880s the peninsula was used by the military who built fortifications on Mount Crawford. A prison was constructed on Mount Crawford in the 1920s and operated until 2012. Since the closure of the prison the fate of the area is uncertain, with a controversial housing development proposed on the site of the former prison.

== Etymology ==
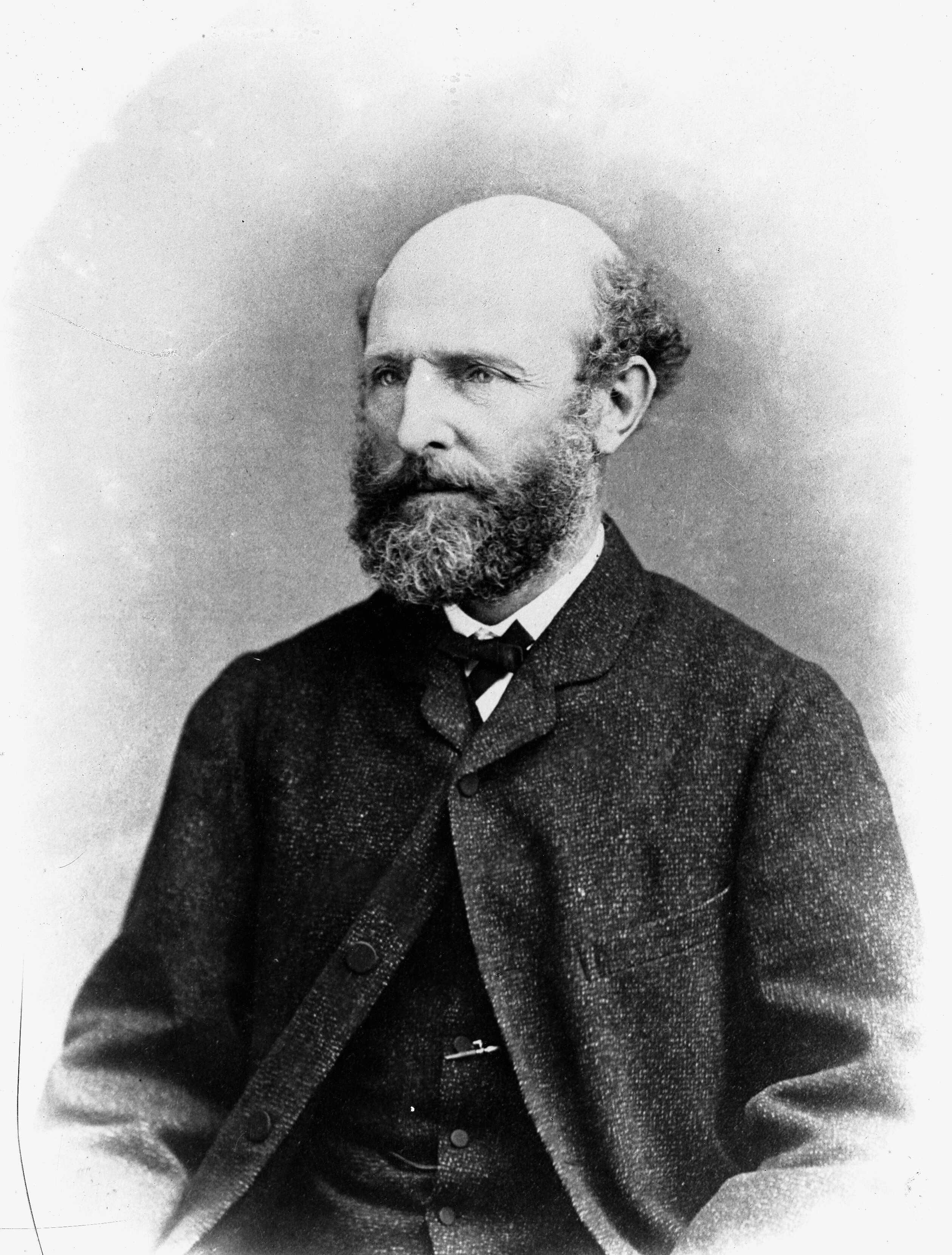
Mt Crawford is the namesake of James Coutts Crawford

Mount Crawford is named after James Coutts Crawford, who purchased the northern lots of the Miramar Peninsula and was the first settler of Wellington.

== Geography ==
Mount Crawford is located at the north end of the Miramar Peninsula and rises to 163 m (535 ft).

== History ==
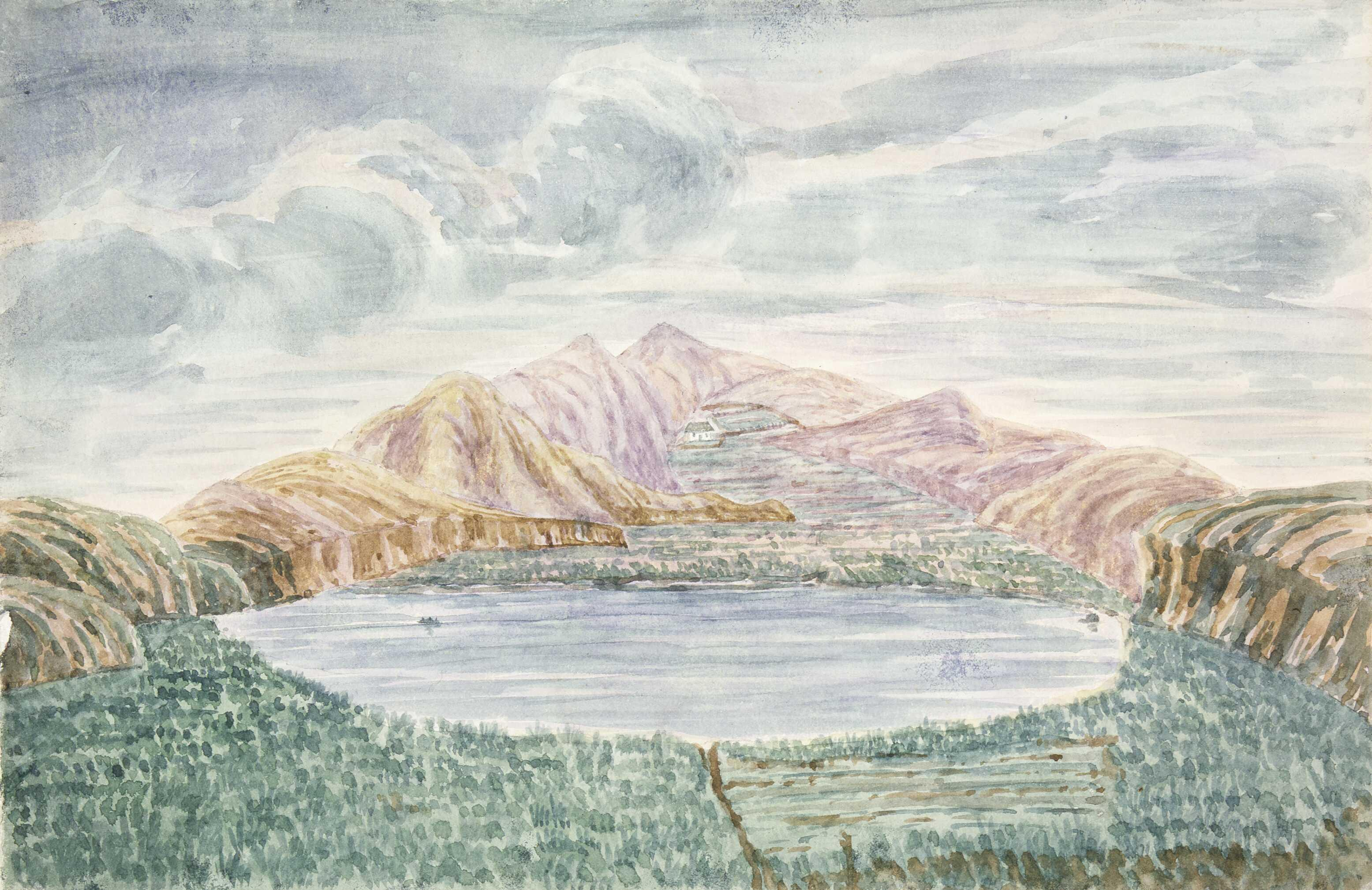
Painting of Burnham Water with Mount Crawford in the background, by James Coutts Crawford

The summit of Mount Crawford was used as a trigonometrical point from the 1840s.

When the Miramar Peninsula was subdivided part of the land was reserved for military use, but the military did not establish a presence on the peninsula until the Russian Scare in 1885. The build up of military infrastructure on the peninsula included the construction of fortifications on Mount Crawford.

The Mount Crawford Redoubt was constructed at the summit in 1891 to protect Fort Ballance. It was extended in 1892 and 1893 to total 350 m (1,150 ft) and included a musketry parapet, banquette, and ditch. There were plans for construction of a blockhouse on the site but this never eventuated. The Mount Crawford Redoubt was the last known redoubt to be constructed in New Zealand and was used up until 1908. The redoubt is also supposedly the site of a pā.

In 1942 four anti-aircraft batteries and a command post were constructed above Point Halswell. The batteries were built to the standardised British Type-A design and were used with QF 3.7-inch AA guns.

In 2000 the New Zealand Defence Force determined that Miramar Peninsula was not needed for defence purposes and began a process of winding down operations and transferring the land to Land Information New Zealand. In 2016 this transfer from the Defence Force was finalised with some of Mount Crawford to become a reserve managed by the Department of Conservation and the rest, including the site of the former Wellington Prison, to be disposed of.

=== Mount Crawford Prison ===
In 1923 the Department of Justice planned to buy land on Mount Crawford for a new prison to replace the Terrace Gaol. The decision was protested by residents of Seatoun and Miramar who instead supported a reserve for the site. Construction began in 1924 using prison labour with the first wing completed in 1926 and the full prison opening in 1927. Mount Crawford Prison was progressive and offered education in trades and horticulture.

The prison closed in June 2008 but reopened the following July to support an increase in the national prison population.

Mount Crawford Prison later came to house prisoners in voluntary segregation. The prison closed in 2012, with prisoners moved to Rimutaka Prison. A Heritage New Zealand report recommended protection and scheduling of the prison buildings, although this has not occurred.

The Port Nicholson Block Settlement Trust plans to demolish the prison and build 650–700 homes on the site. The plan is controversial and has been opposed by some Māori.

=== Mount Crawford Prison Garden ===
A garden and greenhouse were constructed alongside the prison to provide food for inmates, with excess food going to the Wellington Zoo. Pigs and cattle were farmed on the site in addition to vegetables. After the closure of the prison a community group was granted a 0.44 ha (1.1 acres) lease of part of the original gardens to be used as a community garden. Pasture is leased to a local farmer who stocks it with cattle.
