= Karaka Bays =

Suburb of Wellington City, New Zealand

- Suburb
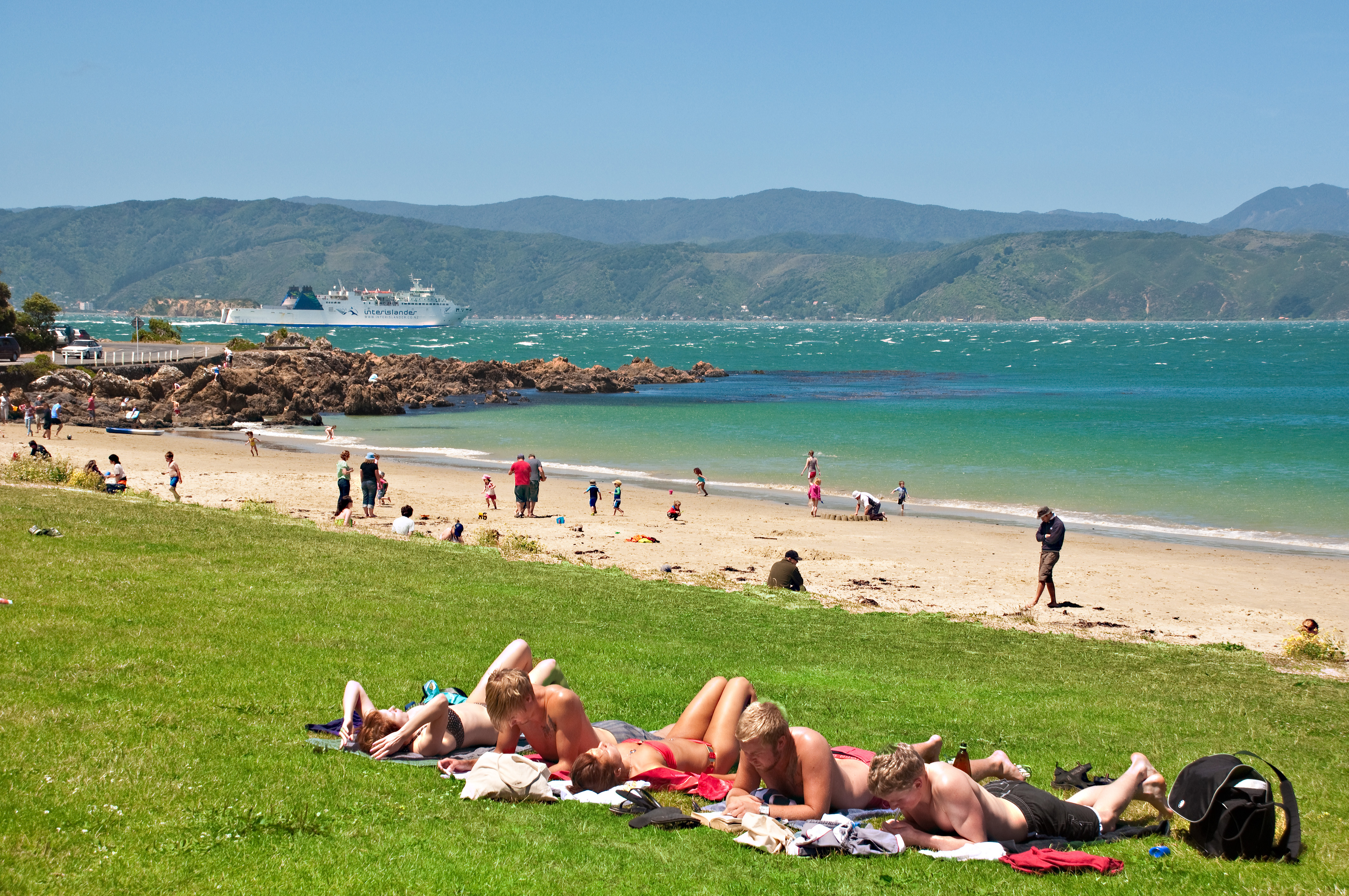
- Scorching Bay, part of Karaka Bays
- Interactive map of Karaka Bays
- Coordinates: 41°18′12″S 174°49′52″E
- Country: New Zealand
- City: Wellington City
- Local authority: Wellington City Council
- Electoral ward: Motukairangi/Eastern Ward; Te Whanganui-a-Tara Māori Ward

Area
  - Land: 39 ha (96 acres)

Population (2023 Census)
  - Total: 744
  - Density: 1,900/km^{2} (4,900/sq mi)

	Maupuia
Maupuia	Karaka Bays
Miramar	Worser Bay

Karaka Bays is a suburb of Wellington, New Zealand. It lies on the northeast coast of the Miramar Peninsula, 6 km east-south-east of the city centre, and has an expansive view of Wellington Harbour. It takes its name from a New Zealand native tree, the karaka (or the New Zealand laurel).

The suburb consists of residential properties close to the shores of two bays, Scorching Bay in the north and Karaka Bay in the south. Nearby suburbs are Miramar and Maupuia. Prominent features of Karaka Bays include the Scorching Bay Domain and a recreational park at the northern end of the suburb. The Cook Strait ferry passes the coast of Karaka Bay on its way between Picton and Wellington.

The area was historically connected with whaling - Coombe Rocks, a series of rocky islets off the coast, were used as a watching-place for cetaceans. In recent years marine mammals have returned to the area, with seals commonly sighted along the coast and orca occasionally visible offshore.

== Demographics ==
Karaka Bays covers an area of 0.39 km^{2} (0.15 sq mi) It is part of the larger Karaka Bay-Worser Bay statistical area.

Historical population for Karaka Bays
Year	Pop.	±% p.a.
2006	759	—
2013	705	−1.05%
2018	765	+1.65%
2023	744	−0.56%

Karaka Bays had a population of 744 in the 2023 New Zealand census, a decrease of 21 people (−2.7%) since the 2018 census, and an increase of 39 people (5.5%) since the 2013 census. There were 369 males and 366 females in 300 dwellings. 3.6% of people identified as LGBTIQ+. There were 111 people (14.9%) aged under 15 years, 99 (13.3%) aged 15 to 29, 372 (50.0%) aged 30 to 64, and 162 (21.8%) aged 65 or older.

People could identify as more than one ethnicity. The results were 91.1% European (Pākehā); 5.2% Māori; 2.8% Pasifika; 7.3% Asian; 1.6% Middle Eastern, Latin American and African New Zealanders (MELAA); and 1.6% other, which includes people giving their ethnicity as "New Zealander". English was spoken by 98.4%, Māori by 1.2%, and other languages by 20.2%. No language could be spoken by 0.4% (e.g. too young to talk). The percentage of people born overseas was 36.7, compared with 28.8% nationally.

Religious affiliations were 26.6% Christian, 0.8% Hindu, 0.8% Buddhist, 0.8% New Age, 0.4% Jewish, and 1.2% other religions. People who answered that they had no religion were 64.1%, and 6.9% of people did not answer the census question.

Of those at least 15 years old, 339 (53.6%) people had a bachelor's or higher degree, 228 (36.0%) had a post-high school certificate or diploma, and 75 (11.8%) people exclusively held high school qualifications. 213 people (33.6%) earned over $100,000 compared to 12.1% nationally. The employment status of those at least 15 was 318 (50.2%) full-time, 96 (15.2%) part-time, and 9 (1.4%) unemployed.

=== Karaka Bay-Worser Bay statistical area ===
Karaka Bay-Worser Bay statistical area, which includes Worser Bay, covers 0.67 km^{2} (0.26 sq mi). It had an estimated population of 1,520 as of June 2025, with a population density of 2,269 people per km^{2}.

Historical population for the statistical area
Year	Pop.	±% p.a.
2006	1,419	—
2013	1,443	+0.24%
2018	1,503	+0.82%
2023	1,470	−0.44%

Karaka Bay-Worser Bay had a population of 1,470 in the 2023 New Zealand census, a decrease of 33 people (−2.2%) since the 2018 census, and an increase of 27 people (1.9%) since the 2013 census. There were 717 males, 741 females, and 12 people of other genders in 597 dwellings. 4.5% of people identified as LGBTIQ+. The median age was 47.8 years (compared with 38.1 years nationally). There were 228 people (15.5%) aged under 15 years, 222 (15.1%) aged 15 to 29, 735 (50.0%) aged 30 to 64, and 285 (19.4%) aged 65 or older.

People could identify as more than one ethnicity. The results were 88.8% European (Pākehā); 6.5% Māori; 2.9% Pasifika; 9.8% Asian; 2.2% Middle Eastern, Latin American and African New Zealanders (MELAA); and 3.3% other, which includes people giving their ethnicity as "New Zealander". English was spoken by 98.8%, Māori by 1.6%, Samoan by 0.2%, and other languages by 19.4%. No language could be spoken by 0.8% (e.g. too young to talk). The percentage of people born overseas was 34.3, compared with 28.8% nationally.

Religious affiliations were 28.4% Christian, 0.8% Hindu, 0.2% Islam, 0.2% Māori religious beliefs, 1.0% Buddhist, 0.4% New Age, 0.4% Jewish, and 1.6% other religions. People who answered that they had no religion were 61.4%, and 5.9% of people did not answer the census question.

Of those at least 15 years old, 684 (55.1%) people had a bachelor's or higher degree, 408 (32.9%) had a post-high school certificate or diploma, and 147 (11.8%) people exclusively held high school qualifications. The median income was $65,300, compared with $41,500 nationally. 414 people (33.3%) earned over $100,000 compared to 12.1% nationally. The employment status of those at least 15 was 645 (51.9%) full-time, 210 (16.9%) part-time, and 30 (2.4%) unemployed.
