= Steeple Rock =

Rock in Wellington Harbour, New Zealand

Coordinates: 41°19′26″S 174°50′29″E

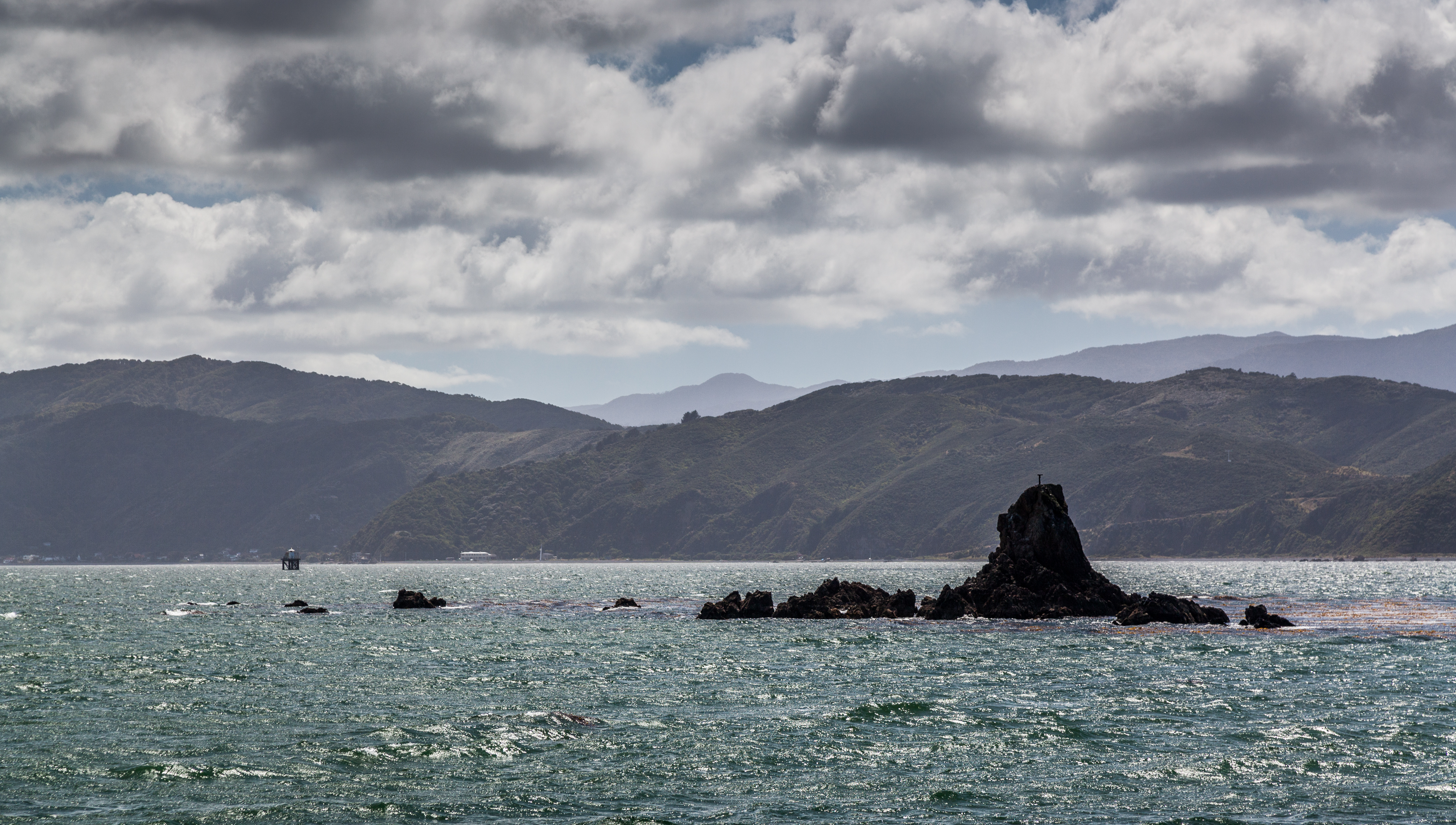
Steeple Rock, Wellington Harbour

Steeple Rock/Te Aroaro-o-Kupe is a large rock off Seatoun at the west of the entrance to Wellington Harbour, rising 7 metres (23 ft) above sea level. The rock plays a role in warning ships off the coast. It is the location of a marine light and an unbeaconed trig station (‘Steeple Rock Light’, geodetic code B0XX).

Its Māori name is Te Aroaro-o-Kupe (The front of Kupe or The presence of Kupe). The name was officially changed in 2009 from the English "Steeple Rock" to the current dual name of Steeple Rock/Te Aroaro-o-Kupe as part of the 2009 Treaty of Waitangi settlement between Taranaki Whānui ki te Upoko o te Ika and the New Zealand government. The previous Māori name of the rock was Te Ure o Kupe (The penis of Kupe). Kupe, the legendary discoverer of Aotearoa, is said to have injured himself on the rock while swimming.

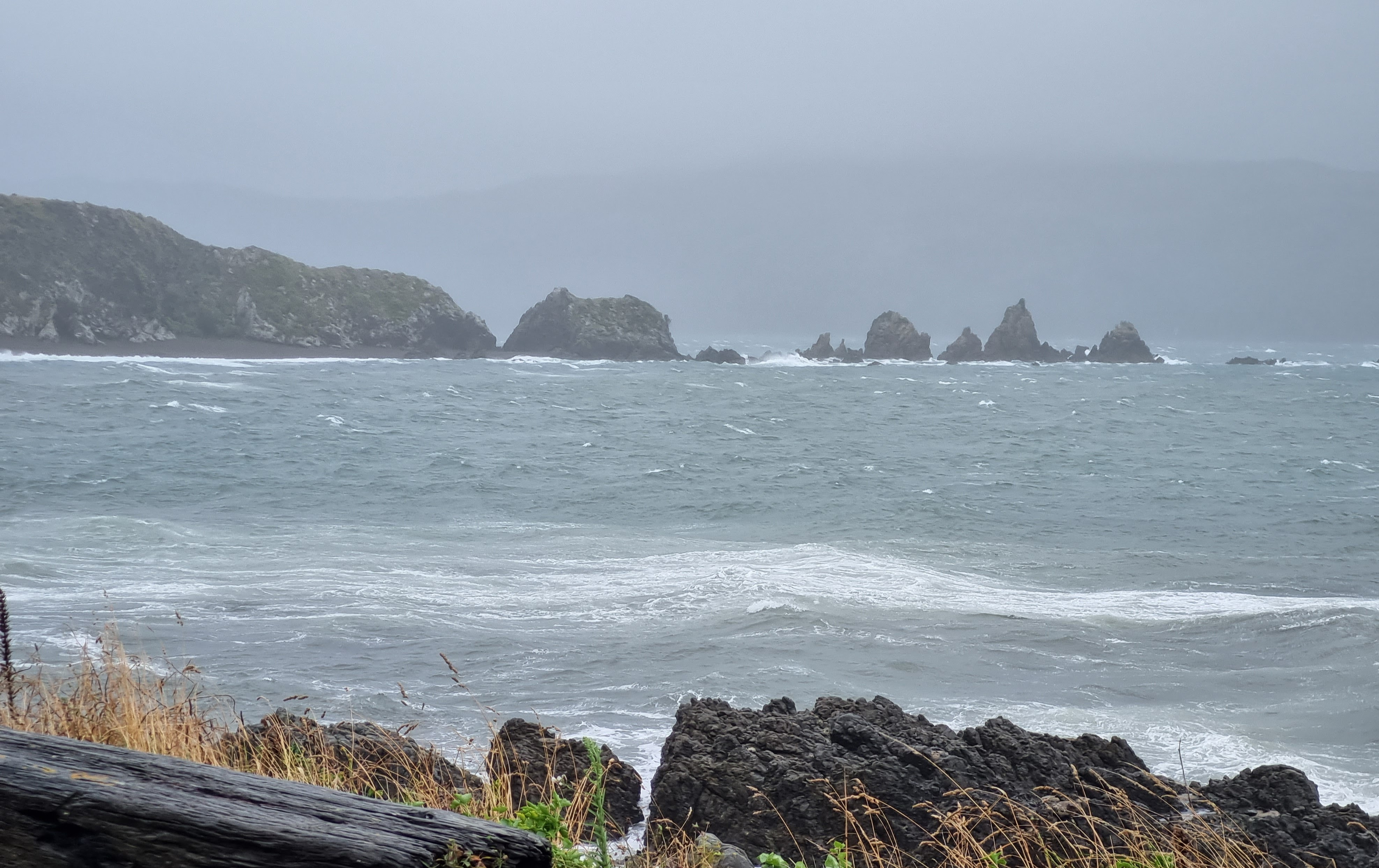
The Pinnacles, a line of rocks south of Steeple Rock.

In earlier times Steeple Rock was also known as Pinnacle Rock. This should not be confused with The Pinnacles, a group of rocks extending from the tip of Point Dorset, south of Steeple Rock.

While Steeple Rock is not as much of a hazard to shipping as Barrett Reef to the south, several ships have got into trouble around the rock, for example:

- 1844 Royal William, sloop. Got stuck and had to be pulled off Steeple Rock.
- 1874 Anne Melhuish, barque. Got stuck at Steeple Rock.
- 1889 Willie McLaren, barque. Damaged when it hit a rock near Steeple Rock. Took on water, so the captain took the ship to Worser Bay where it sank.
- 1921 Rona, barque. Ran aground on Steeple Rock. Refloated and repaired.
- 1968 TEV Wahine, inter-island passenger ferry. The Wahine struck Barrett Reef and then drifted north until she foundered near Steeple Rock. 53 lives lost.

The Steeple Rock Light was installed in 1934 in the water to the east of Steeple Rock. The structure consists of a two-part concrete shell that was moved to the site by the floating crane Hikitia, then filled with concrete. It originally ran on gas but was converted to solar power in 1993.
