= Maupuia =

Suburb of Wellington City, New Zealand

- Suburb
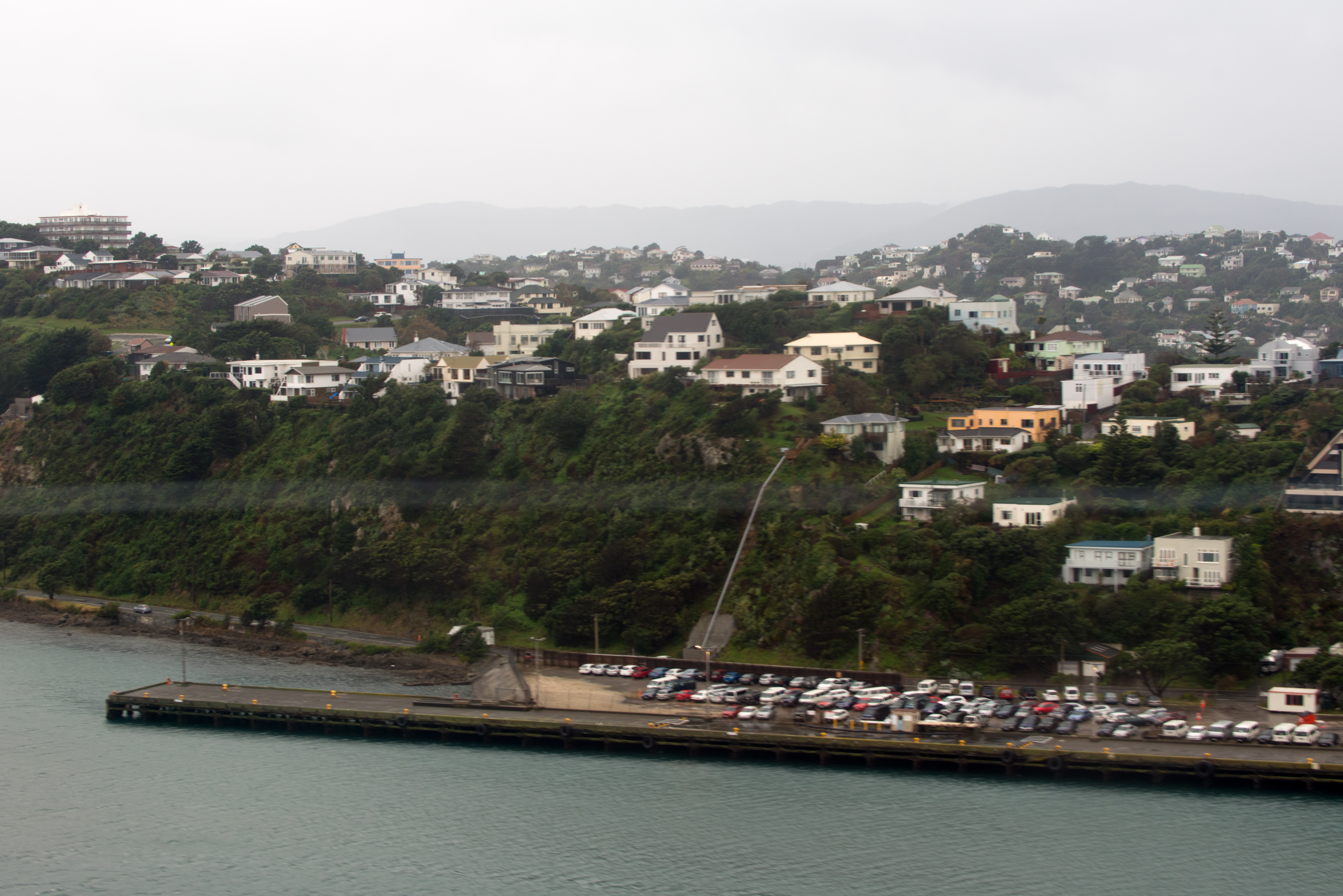
- Aerial view of Maupuia from the west
- Interactive map of Maupuia
- Coordinates: 41.307°S 174.818°E
- Country: New Zealand
- City: Wellington City
- Local authority: Wellington City Council
- Electoral ward: Motukairangi/Eastern Ward; Te Whanganui-a-Tara Māori Ward
- Established: 1970s

Area
  - Land: 196 ha (480 acres)

Population (June 2025)
  - Total: 1,500
  - Density: 770/km^{2} (2,000/sq mi)

| | Wellington Harbour |
| Evans Bay | Maupuia | Wellington Harbour |
| | Miramar | Seatoun |

Maupuia on the Miramar Peninsula is an eastern suburb of Wellington to the north-west of Miramar. Developed in the 1970s, it is in the Eastern Ward.

The northern part of the peninsula, sometimes known as Crawford, includes Maupuia Park, the former Wellington Prison (also known as Mount Crawford Prison) and at the tip of the peninsula on Point Halswell the Massey Memorial, the mausoleum of former prime minister William Massey. Shelly Bay on the west side of the peninsula is a former military (navy and air force) base and is proposed to be developed for housing.

Other bays on the west side of the peninsula are Karaka Bay, Shark Bay, Mahanga Bay and Kau Bay.

== History ==
Originally the area was the site of a Māori pa. Maupuia was part of the Miramar Borough from 1904 to 1921, when the borough was incorporated into the City of Wellington.

In 1949 the Wellington City Council exchanged with the government the Townsend Estate of 145½ acres (59 ha) on Watts (Miramar) Peninsula for 13¼ acres (5.4 ha) of Town Belt land adjacent to the Victoria University of Wellington required for expansion of the university (plus £4,000).

The land was developed from 1970 as a prestige residential subdivision for 2,500 people ultimately; with initially 100 single houses, 170 town houses, 150 two-person flats, 246 three-person flats and 24 pensioner flats. Earthworks over two years involved moving 350,000 cubic yards (268,000 cubic metres) of spoil in 70,000 truckloads. The sections, with views of Evans Bay, the harbour and Wellington Airport were balloted. Eventually shopping and recreational facilities were to be provided.

== Demographics ==
Maupuia statistical area covers 1.96 km^{2} (0.76 sq mi). It had an estimated population of 1,500 as of June 2025, with a population density of 765 people per km^{2}.

Historical population
| Year | Pop. | ±% p.a. |
|---|---|---|
| 2006 | 1,557 | — |
| 2013 | 1,524 | −0.31% |
| 2018 | 1,485 | −0.52% |
| 2023 | 1,470 | −0.20% |
The 2006 population is for an area of 1.95 km^{2} with a different boundary with Miramar Central. Source:

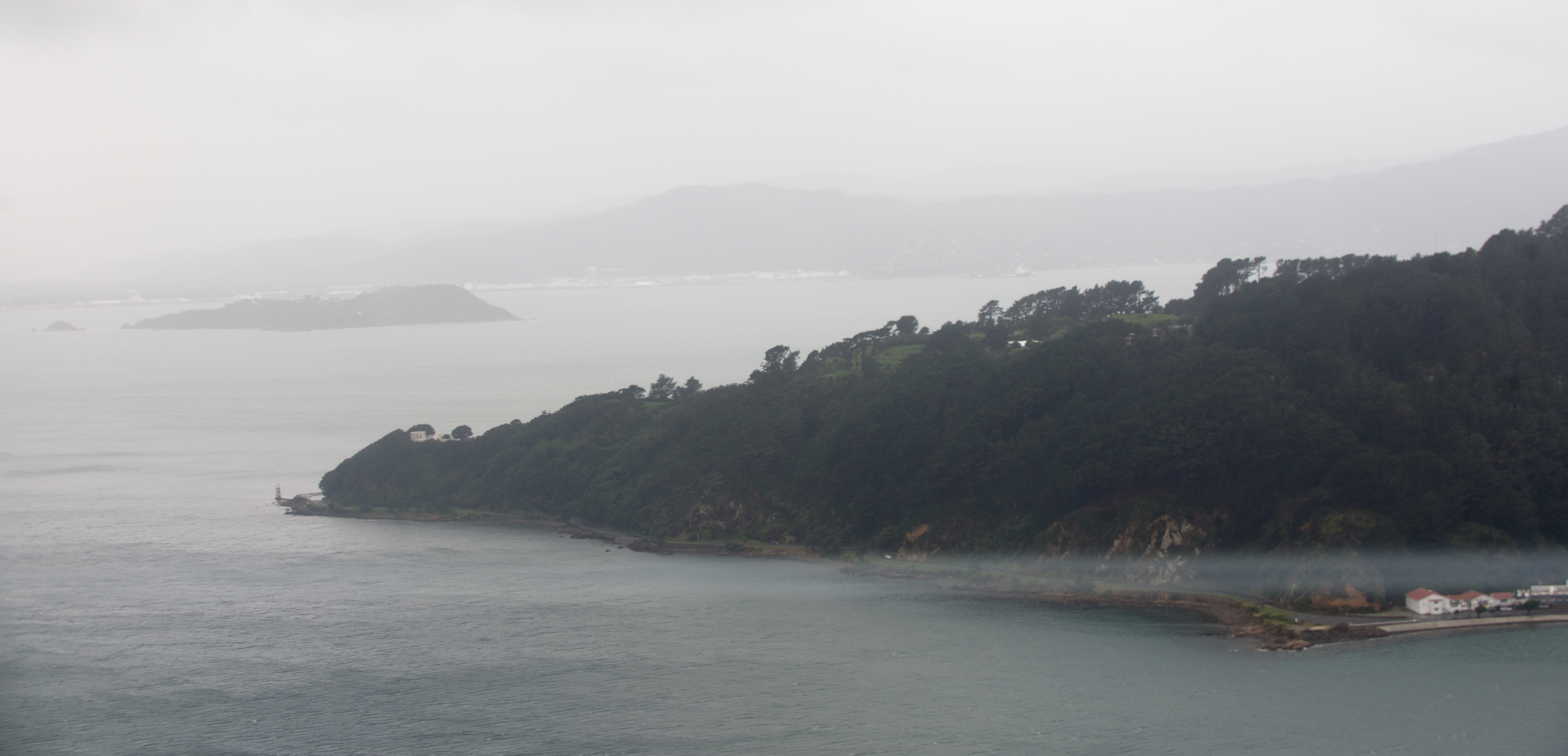
Northern end of Miramar peninsula

Maupuia had a population of 1,470 in the 2023 New Zealand census, a decrease of 15 people (−1.0%) since the 2018 census, and a decrease of 54 people (−3.5%) since the 2013 census. There were 732 males, 729 females, and 12 people of other genders in 591 dwellings. 5.5% of people identified as LGBTIQ+. The median age was 38.5 years (compared with 38.1 years nationally). There were 225 people (15.3%) aged under 15 years, 288 (19.6%) aged 15 to 29, 765 (52.0%) aged 30 to 64, and 195 (13.3%) aged 65 or older.

People could identify as more than one ethnicity. The results were 62.2% European (Pākehā); 10.4% Māori; 9.2% Pasifika; 26.5% Asian; 4.3% Middle Eastern, Latin American and African New Zealanders (MELAA); and 1.8% other, which includes people giving their ethnicity as "New Zealander". English was spoken by 95.1%, Māori by 3.3%, Samoan by 4.7%, and other languages by 26.1%. No language could be spoken by 2.0% (e.g. too young to talk). New Zealand Sign Language was known by 0.4%. The percentage of people born overseas was 34.9, compared with 28.8% nationally.

Religious affiliations were 26.9% Christian, 9.4% Hindu, 2.2% Islam, 0.6% Māori religious beliefs, 3.3% Buddhist, 0.6% New Age, and 0.8% other religions. People who answered that they had no religion were 50.6%, and 5.7% of people did not answer the census question.

Of those at least 15 years old, 465 (37.3%) people had a bachelor's or higher degree, 540 (43.4%) had a post-high school certificate or diploma, and 243 (19.5%) people exclusively held high school qualifications. The median income was $56,500, compared with $41,500 nationally. 261 people (21.0%) earned over $100,000 compared to 12.1% nationally. The employment status of those at least 15 was 750 (60.2%) full-time, 144 (11.6%) part-time, and 24 (1.9%) unemployed.
