= Worser Bay =

Coordinates: 41°19′S 174°50′E

- Suburb
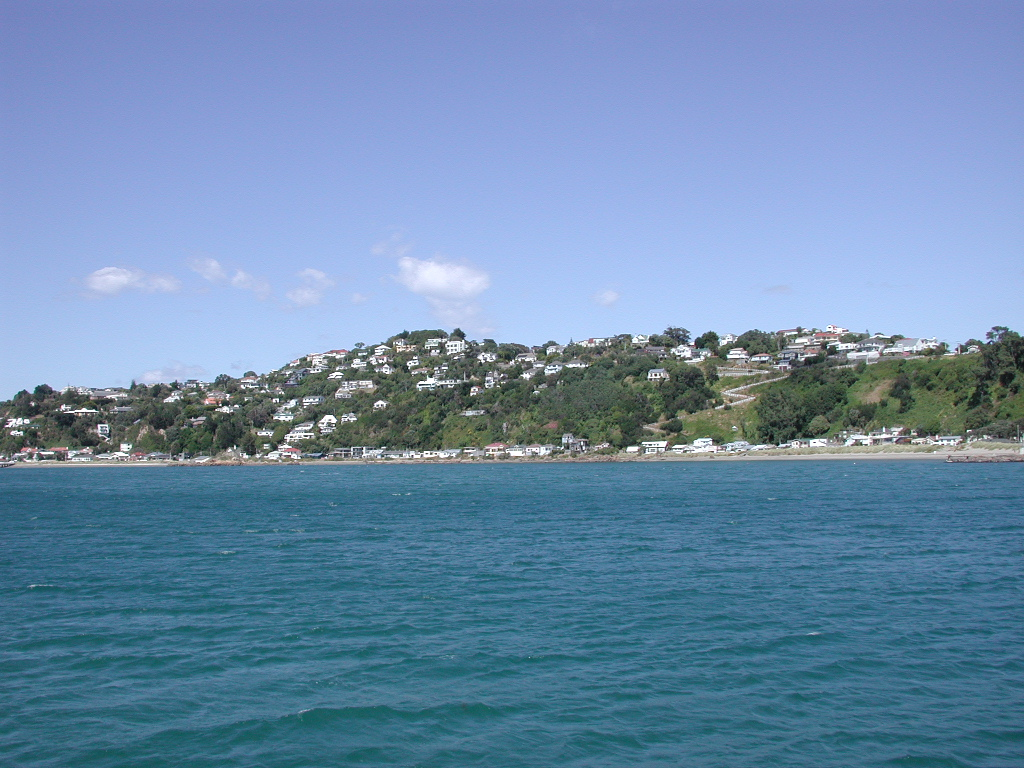
- Worser Bay, Seatoun from Wellington Harbour Ferry
- Interactive map of Worser Bay
- Country: New Zealand
- City: Wellington City
- Electoral ward: Motukairangi/Eastern Ward

Area
  - Land: 29 ha (72 acres)

Population (2023 Census)
  - Total: 729
  - Density: 2,500/km^{2} (6,500/sq mi)

	Karaka Bay
Miramar	Worser Bay	Wellington Harbour
	Seatoun

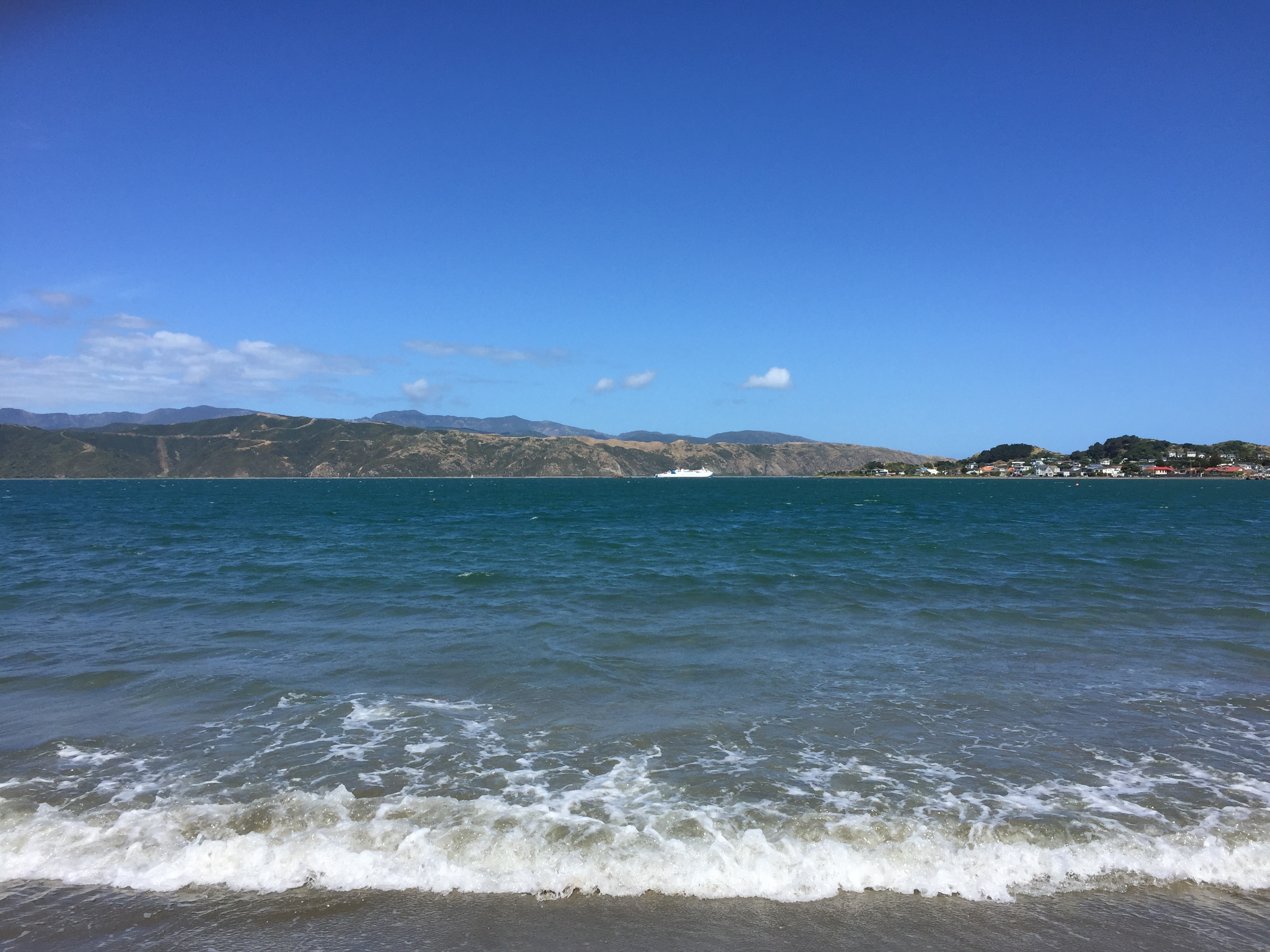
Waves at Worser Bay

Worser Bay in Wellington, New Zealand is along the beach from Seatoun and over the hill from Miramar on the Miramar Peninsula. It has a calm sandy beach with a road running along the base of the Seatoun Heights hill. Houses run all along the hill side of the road, with only carparks and beach facilities opposite.

The beach is subject to the windy conditions of Wellington with gusty northerlies often changing to cold, consistent southerlies. The waters are calm as the beach is within the natural harbour and in summer it is a popular destination for families, much like the nearby Scorching Bay.

Named after James Heberley's frequent predictions of "worser" weather, the beach still has the original pilot's cottage that housed James and other pilots from 1866. Another story about James Heberley's nickname refers to a report of his ascent of Mt Egmont, when he said: "None the worser," and after that he was known as "Worser".

== Features ==
Early history of this area included Māori chief and navigator Whatonga (c. 1130 – c. 1190) encouraging settlement on the ridge above the Spring of Tara (Te Puna a Tara) in Worser Bay.

The Worser Bay yacht club, scout hall and surf club buildings are located at the northern end of the beach.

The Worser Bay Boating Club was founded in 1926 and has become a leader in the New Zealand-specific Sunburst class dinghy yacht. There is also a strong emphasis on youth sailing in Optimist, P-Class and Starling dinghies. Of late, 420s and Skiffs have become increasing popular. Along with a number of national champions, in 2002 Greg Wilcox won the World OK dinghy championships at Napier, New Zealand.

The Sea Scouts hall was built in 1967 on top of a wartime Mine Control Building, which has since been converted to hold the dinghy yachts and rowing boats. Numbers dwindled in the 1990s, but the Cub Scouts are currently enjoying a resurgence.

The Worser Bay Surf Lifesaving Club was founded in 1910, competing in the many surf lifesaving events around the country. While it lasted many years beyond that of the Scorching Bay Lifesaving Club, the numbers at Worser Bay dwindled until the 1990s when official functions at the club ceased (the complete lack of surf did not help). Near the end of the decade a windsurf school began using the facilities. This would seem to have stirred the club and it reopened as a lifesaving club in the 2000s, focusing on youth.

== Demographics ==
Worser Bay covers an area of 0.29 km^{2} (0.11 sq mi) It is part of the larger Karaka Bay-Worser Bay statistical area.

Historical population
Year	Pop.	±% p.a.
2006	660	—
2013	735	+1.55%
2018	738	+0.08%
2023	729	−0.25%

Worser Bay had a population of 729 in the 2023 New Zealand census, a decrease of 9 people (−1.2%) since the 2018 census, and a decrease of 6 people (−0.8%) since the 2013 census. There were 348 males, 375 females, and 12 people of other genders in 294 dwellings. 4.9% of people identified as LGBTIQ+. There were 117 people (16.0%) aged under 15 years, 120 (16.5%) aged 15 to 29, 360 (49.4%) aged 30 to 64, and 132 (18.1%) aged 65 or older.

People could identify as more than one ethnicity. The results were 86.0% European (Pākehā); 7.0% Māori; 3.3% Pasifika; 12.8% Asian; 3.7% Middle Eastern, Latin American and African New Zealanders (MELAA); and 3.3% other, which includes people giving their ethnicity as "New Zealander". English was spoken by 98.8%, Māori by 1.6%, and other languages by 17.7%. No language could be spoken by 1.6% (e.g. too young to talk). The percentage of people born overseas was 32.1, compared with 28.8% nationally.

Religious affiliations were 30.5% Christian, 2.1% Hindu, 0.4% Islam, 0.4% Māori religious beliefs, 0.8% Buddhist, and 1.6% other religions. People who answered that they had no religion were 58.8%, and 6.2% of people did not answer the census question.

Of those at least 15 years old, 348 (56.9%) people had a bachelor's or higher degree, 189 (30.9%) had a post-high school certificate or diploma, and 81 (13.2%) people exclusively held high school qualifications. 195 people (31.9%) earned over $100,000 compared to 12.1% nationally. The employment status of those at least 15 was 321 (52.5%) full-time, 108 (17.6%) part-time, and 15 (2.5%) unemployed.

== Education ==
Worser Bay School is a co-educational state primary school for Year 1 to 6 students, with a roll of 110 as of July 2026.

The school is situated at the top of the hill between Seatoun Heights and Miramar Heights. It celebrated its centenary in 1997. It is the site of an old Māori Pā, Whetukairangi (Star Gazer).
