= Miramar, New Zealand =

Suburb of Wellington City, New Zealand

Miramar
- Suburb
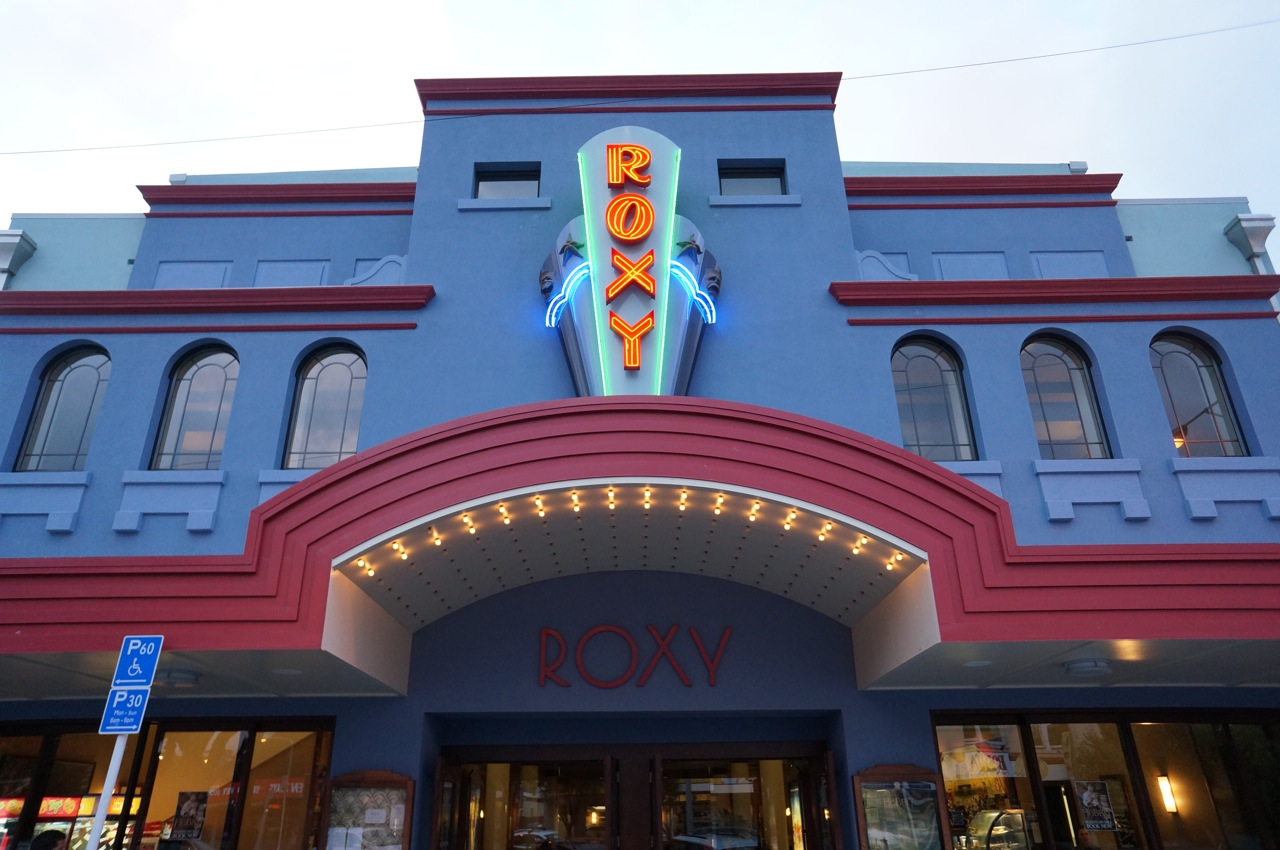
- Roxy Cinema in Miramar
- Interactive map of Miramar
- Coordinates: 41°19′S 174°49′E
- Country: New Zealand
- City: Wellington City
- Local authority: Wellington City Council
- Electoral ward: Motukairangi/Eastern Ward; Te Whanganui-a-Tara Māori Ward
- Established: 1904

Area
  - Land: 287 ha (710 acres)

Population (June 2025)
  - Total: 9,900
  - Density: 3,400/km^{2} (8,900/sq mi)

	Maupuia	Karaka Bays
Kilbirnie	Miramar	Worser Bay
Rongotai	Strathmore Park	Seatoun

Miramar is a suburb of Wellington, New Zealand, south-east of the city centre. It is on the Miramar Peninsula, directly east of the isthmus of Rongotai, the site of Wellington International Airport.

== History ==
Miramar Peninsula was originally an island, separated from Kilbirnie by a sea channel called Te Awa-a-Taia (the channel of Taia); this was where the Rongotai isthmus is now. The original Māori name for the whole area when it was still an island was Te Motu Kairangi (meaning "esteemed" or "precious" island).

'Miramar' means 'sea view' in Spanish. The name was chosen by the first European to settle in the area, Scotsman Coutts Crawford (1817–1889). Crawford was a former Royal Navy officer turned businessman and colonist, who arrived in Wellington in 1840. Crawford established a farm on Miramar Peninsula, which at the time was known as Watt's Peninsula, and drained a large lagoon known as Para Lake or Burnham Water. The lagoon covered much of the low-lying land in the centre of the peninsula; this area is now occupied by suburban houses, streets, parks and shops in the suburb of Miramar.

On 18 November 1904 Miramar Borough was formed. In April 1921, Miramar was incorporated into the city of Wellington. The records of the Miramar Borough Council were transferred to the City of Wellington at the time of amalgamation and can still be accessed today through Wellington City Council. In November 2023, Miramar Peninsula was declared rat- and mustelid-free by Predator Free Wellington.

== Location ==
As of 2024, the suburb of Miramar consists of the mainly-flat central basin of Miramar Peninsula, separated from surrounding suburbs from the northwest around to the east by a ring of hills. In the northwest and north, Miramar's boundary with Maupuia lies roughly along the ridgeline, and to the east Nevay Road and Seatoun Heights Road separate Miramar from Karaka Bays and Seatoun. In the flatter west and south, Miramar is bounded by Calabar Road and Wellington Airport to the west and by Broadway and Strathmore Park to the south.

== Demographics ==
Miramar, comprising the statistical areas of Miramar North, Miramar Central, Miramar East and Miramar South, covers 2.87 km^{2} (1.11 sq mi). It had an estimated population of 9,900 as of June 2025, with a population density of 3,449 people per km^{2}.

Historical population
Year	Pop.	±% p.a.
2006	9,210	—
2013	9,564	+0.54%
2018	9,933	+0.76%
2023	9,636	−0.61%
The 2006 population is for an area of the same size but with a different boundary with Maupuia. Source:

Miramar had a population of 9,636 in the 2023 New Zealand census, a decrease of 297 people (−3.0%) since the 2018 census, and an increase of 72 people (0.8%) since the 2013 census. There were 4,743 males, 4,827 females, and 69 people of other genders in 3,609 dwellings. 5.5% of people identified as LGBTIQ+. The median age was 39.2 years (compared with 38.1 years nationally). There were 1,647 people (17.1%) aged under 15 years, 1,902 (19.7%) aged 15 to 29, 4,635 (48.1%) aged 30 to 64, and 1,458 (15.1%) aged 65 or older.

People could identify as more than one ethnicity. The results were 66.3% European (Pākehā); 10.1% Māori; 10.7% Pasifika; 21.3% Asian; 4.7% Middle Eastern, Latin American and African New Zealanders (MELAA); and 2.4% other, which includes people giving their ethnicity as "New Zealander". English was spoken by 94.5%, Māori by 2.6%, Samoan by 4.7%, and other languages by 24.7%. No language could be spoken by 1.8% (e.g. too young to talk). New Zealand Sign Language was known by 0.5%. The percentage of people born overseas was 33.0, compared with 28.8% nationally.

Religious affiliations were 33.2% Christian, 5.2% Hindu, 1.1% Islam, 0.5% Māori religious beliefs, 2.5% Buddhist, 0.4% New Age, 0.2% Jewish, and 1.3% other religions. People who answered that they had no religion were 49.9%, and 5.9% of people did not answer the census question.

Of those at least 15 years old, 2,832 (35.4%) people had a bachelor's or higher degree, 3,414 (42.7%) had a post-high school certificate or diploma, and 1,746 (21.9%) people exclusively held high school qualifications. The median income was $50,600, compared with $41,500 nationally. 1,593 people (19.9%) earned over $100,000 compared to 12.1% nationally. The employment status of those at least 15 was 4,533 (56.7%) full-time, 1,035 (13.0%) part-time, and 195 (2.4%) unemployed.

Individual statistical areas
Name	Area (km^{2})	Population	Density (per km^{2})	Dwellings	Median age	Median income
Miramar North	0.51	1,353	2,653	468	36.3 years	$44,700
Miramar Central	0.53	1,980	3,736	804	39.8 years	$44,100
Miramar East	0.85	2,922	3,438	1,077	40.3 years	$60,800
Miramar South	0.98	3,381	3,450	1,260	38.9 years	$47,900
New Zealand					38.1 years	$41,500

== Film ==
In 1936 the government took over the lease of an independent film company called Filmcraft in Darlington Rd, Miramar. It set up a full body, government film production operation which covered the 1940 Centennial celebrations and New Zealand's contribution in World War II. It was called the National Film Unit. In 1979 the NFU moved to Avalon, Lower Hutt, next to the national television entity Avalon Studios. In the 1990s, film director Sir Peter Jackson purchased the former Film Unit premises in Miramar, to produce his films. He used the NFU's facilities while making Braindead. Since then, Jackson and his colleagues Sir Richard Taylor (VFX) and Jamie Selkirk (Editor) have built a series of multi million-dollar studios, sound stages, and pre- and post-production facilities in Miramar that include Stone Street Studios, Park Road Post, Weta Digital, and Weta Workshop. Jackson filmed the studio scenes of The Lord of the Rings trilogy and King Kong in Miramar. Miramar has been hailed by Mexican film director Guillermo del Toro as "Hollywood the way God intended it".

=== Roxy Cinema ===
The Roxy Cinema building at the Miramar shopping centre in Park Road was built by local businessman Sidney Morrison, and opened as Capitol Theatre in January 1929. The Capitol closed in 1964 and the building then became the Capitol Court shopping plaza. After lying abandoned for many years, the building was bought by Camperdown Studios Group in 2003. The façade was retained but the rest of the building was demolished and rebuilt as a two-screen movie theatre, opening in 2011. The building was obtained by new owners with the interior of the building now designed in a lush 1930s style. The upstairs lobby features a large ceiling mural by Greg Broadmore of Weta Workshop, which was inspired by the film Metropolis. An Oscar won by Jamie Selkirk was on display in the theatre, and a statue of Gandalf stands in front of the building.

== Education ==
=== Early Childhood Education ===
There are a number of early childhood educational facilities in Miramar, including Miramar North Kindergarten, Miramar Central Kindergarten, Tuatara Kids, Kidz Corner, and Montessori Children's House.

=== Primary schools ===
Miramar Central School is a co-educational state primary school for Year 1 to 6 students, with a roll of 175 as of October 2025. It opened in 1929.

Miramar North School is also a co-educational state primary school for Year 1 to 6 students, with a roll of 228. It opened in 1939.

Year 7 and 8 students from Miramar typically attend Evans Bay Intermediate School in Kilbirnie.

Holy Cross School is a co-educational state-integrated Catholic primary school for Year 1 to 8 students, with a roll of 176 in 2022. It opened in 1932, and was for girls in years 1 to 8 and boys in years 1 to 4. From 1937 to 1941, it shared its site with Marist Miramar, a school for boys in years 5 to 8. Marist Miramar moved to its own site in 1941. In 1983, the two schools amalgamated to become Marist Holy Cross. The current name was adopted in 1989.

Miramar Christian School, a co-educational state-integrated Christianity-based primary school for Year 1 to 8 students, was established in Miramar in 1979. From 2025 it moved to Johnsonville and the name was changed to Wellington Hills Christian College.

Miramar South School was a former state primary school in the south of the suburb. It opened in 1922 and closed in 2012, when it merged with Strathmore Community School at their site in Strathmore Park to form Kahurangi School.

=== Secondary schools ===
Secondary students in Miramar are within the school enrolment zones of the state secondary schools Wellington East Girls' College (single-sex, girls) in Mount Victoria, Rongotai College (single-sex, boys) in Rongotai, and Wellington High School (co-educational) in Mount Cook.
