= Hataitai =

Suburb of Wellington City, New Zealand

- Suburb
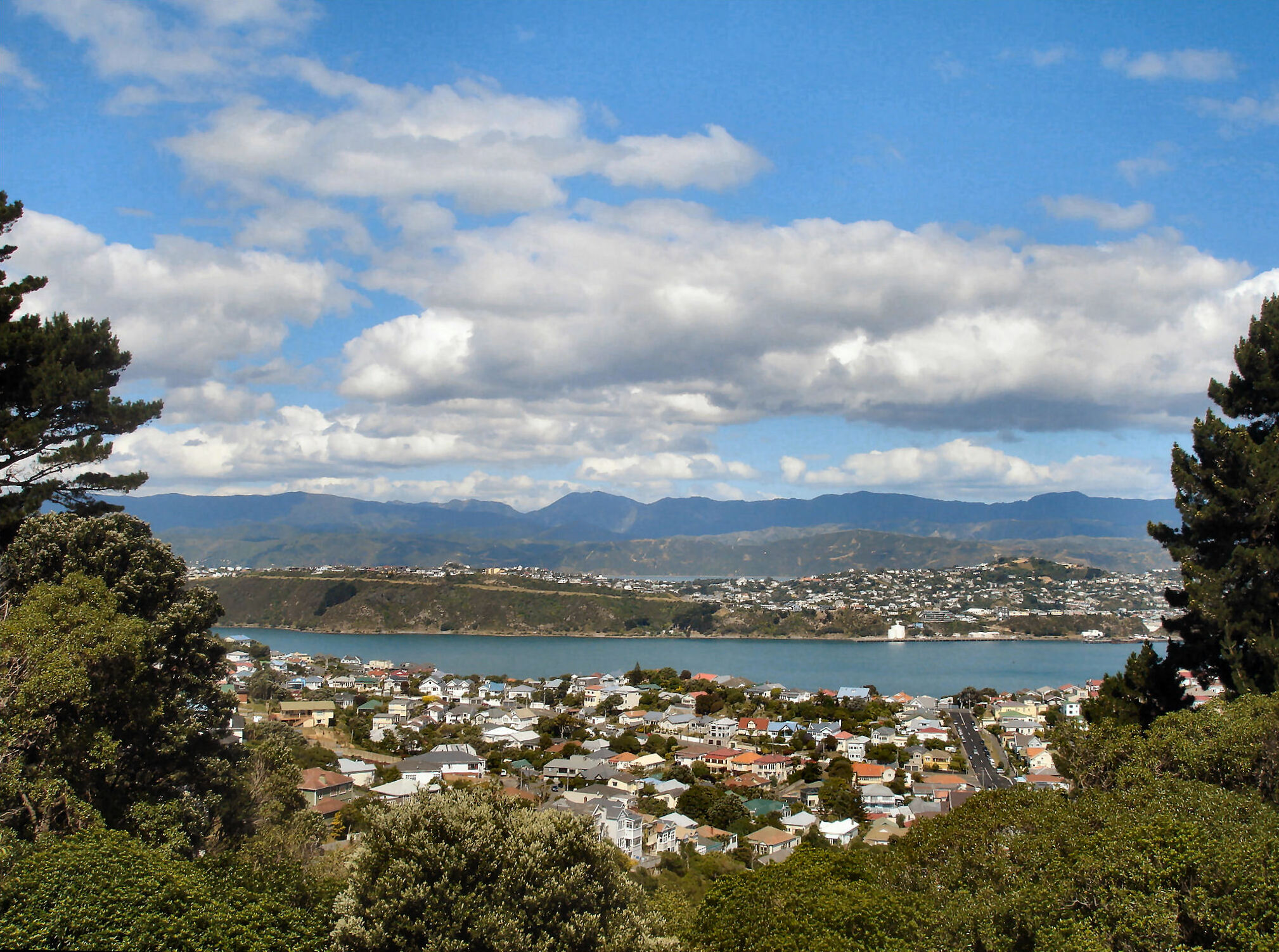
- Looking east from Mt Victoria, with Hataitai in the foreground, Evans Bay and Miramar behind it
- Interactive map of Hataitai
- Coordinates: 41°18′12″S 174°47′47″E
- Country: New Zealand
- City: Wellington City
- Local authority: Wellington City Council
- Electoral ward: Motukairangi/Eastern Ward; Te Whanganui-a-Tara Māori Ward

Area
  - Land: 184 ha (450 acres)

Population (June 2025)
  - Total: 6,610
  - Density: 3,590/km^{2} (9,300/sq mi)

Mount Victoria	Oriental Bay, Roseneath
Mount Cook	Hataitai	Evans Bay
Newtown	Kilbirnie

Hataitai is an inner-city suburb of Wellington, the capital of New Zealand, 3.5 kilometres southeast of the city centre. The suburb extends over the southeastern flank of Mount Victoria and down a valley between the Town Belt and a ridge along the shoreline of Evans Bay. Hataitai is bounded by Hepara Street, Grafton Road and the suburb of Roseneath in the north, Wellington Harbour in the east, Cobham Drive, Wellington Road and Crawford Road in the south, and Alexandra Road in the west.

Hataitai is on important transport links between the central city and Wellington Airport, to the south of Evans Bay on the isthmus at Rongotai. It is at the eastern end of the Mount Victoria Tunnel and the bus-only Hataitai Tunnel, built in 1907 for trams, making Hataitai a popular place to live.

== Origin of name ==
The earliest European pioneers in Wellington knew the area that became Hataitai as "Jenkins Estate". The name Hataitai originated with the syndicate which sub-divided it for building in 1901, and derives from Whātaitai, the name of one of the two brother taniwha (sea monsters) that formed Te Whanganui-a-Tara (The Great Harbour of Tara/Wellington Harbour). However, it is Miramar Peninsula that is thought to be the petrified remains of the great taniwha Whātaitai.

The story goes that when the taniwha Ngake broke through the mountains that separated the then-lake from the Cook Strait, the waters rushed out, leaving his older brother Whātaitai stranded on the rocks as he tried to escape after him. An earthquake later lifted Whātaitai's body completely out of the water, causing him to dry out and pass away. With his body having turned to earth, Whātaitai's spirit manifested into a bird that flew to the top of Tangi Te Keo (Mount Victoria) to mourn never being able to be with his brother again.

== Settlement ==
Colonial settlement of the area dates from 1841, with land used mainly for farming and grazing. Robert Jenkins acquired a hundred acres of hill pasture. In order to reach it he made a road up Mount Victoria, fenced much of his land and used it for breeding horses. Population was minimal until the late 19th century. In the early days the area was part of Kilbirnie in the Evans Bay district – so the school opened in Moxham Ave in 1884 was called Kilbirnie School. In 1901 the Hataitai Land Company was formed to sell sections on the hillsides north from Waitoa Road, and the area became known as Hataitai. In 1902 the new suburb was advertised by the cutting of gigantic letters spelling 'HATAITAI' in the turf of the town side of Mount Victoria. Many of the streets in Hataitai are named after native trees: Hinau Road, Konini Road, Matai Road, Rata Road, Rewa Road etc.

Significant development took place from the early 20th century into the 1950s, spurred by improved access via the Hataitai tram (now bus) tunnel (opened in 1907) and the Mt Victoria tunnel (1931). The population increased slightly between 2001 and 2006, a result of new dwellings being added to the area.

== Demographics ==
Hataitai covers 1.84 km^{2} (0.71 sq mi) and had an estimated population of 6,610 as of June 2025, with a population density of 3,592 people per km^{2}.

Historical population
Year	Pop.	±% p.a.
2006	6,099	—
2013	6,288	+0.44%
2018	6,615	+1.02%
2023	6,465	−0.46%

Hataitai had a population of 6,465 in the 2023 New Zealand census, a decrease of 150 people (−2.3%) since the 2018 census, and an increase of 177 people (2.8%) since the 2013 census. There were 3,141 males, 3,204 females, and 123 people of other genders in 2,502 dwellings. 11.0% of people identified as LGBTIQ+. The median age was 32.8 years (compared with 38.1 years nationally). There were 783 people (12.1%) aged under 15 years, 2,079 (32.2%) aged 15 to 29, 2,979 (46.1%) aged 30 to 64, and 624 (9.7%) aged 65 or older.

People could identify as more than one ethnicity. The results were 83.4% European (Pākehā); 9.6% Māori; 3.9% Pasifika; 12.2% Asian; 2.8% Middle Eastern, Latin American and African New Zealanders (MELAA); and 1.9% other, which includes people giving their ethnicity as "New Zealander". English was spoken by 98.2%, Māori by 2.6%, Samoan by 0.6%, and other languages by 19.8%. No language could be spoken by 1.1% (e.g. too young to talk). New Zealand Sign Language was known by 0.6%. The percentage of people born overseas was 30.1, compared with 28.8% nationally.

Religious affiliations were 22.3% Christian, 1.9% Hindu, 0.5% Islam, 0.2% Māori religious beliefs, 0.9% Buddhist, 0.7% New Age, 0.2% Jewish, and 1.9% other religions. People who answered that they had no religion were 66.1%, and 5.5% of people did not answer the census question.

Of those at least 15 years old, 3,144 (55.3%) people had a bachelor's or higher degree, 2,001 (35.2%) had a post-high school certificate or diploma, and 540 (9.5%) people exclusively held high school qualifications. The median income was $61,100, compared with $41,500 nationally. 1,497 people (26.3%) earned over $100,000 compared to 12.1% nationally. The employment status of those at least 15 was 3,702 (65.2%) full-time, 756 (13.3%) part-time, and 174 (3.1%) unemployed.

Individual statistical areas
Name	Area (km^{2})	Population	Density (per km^{2})	Dwellings	Median age	Median income
Hataitai North West	0.61	1,728	2,833	660	30.5 years	$60,000
Hataitai North East	0.45	2,175	4,833	801	33.8 years	$62,000
Evans Bay	0.35	1,128	3,223	450	35.3 years	$62,700
Hataitai South	0.43	1,434	3,335	594	33.2 years	$60,100
New Zealand					38.1 years	$41,500

== Amenities ==
A small shopping village is centred on Moxham Avenue and Waitoa Road. In 2011 Wellington City Council added Hataitai Village shops to its District Plan list of heritage buildings. The heritage listings mean the buildings are recognised and protected for their heritage value and any major changes to the outside of listed buildings, or demolition of them, would require resource consent. Most of the buildings at the village date from the 1910s and 1920s and together they form a historic streetscape that is rare in Wellington.

Sports facilities include the Badminton Hall on Ruahine Street and Hataitai Park on the Town Belt. Hataitai Park has a velodrome, tennis courts and rugby fields. Other community facilities include a community centre and bowling club, both of which offer venues for community activities, a medical centre, three churches (All Saints Anglican, Hataitai Methodist, Latter-day Saints) and the Treasure Grove and Waipapa Road Play Areas. In addition, the Alexandra Road Play area is accessible from Hepara Street, with a 180 degree view from Wellington Harbour's Eastbourne to Lyall Bay in the South and only a short walk to the Mount Victoria summit.

== Education ==
=== Primary schools ===
Hataitai School is a co-educational state primary school for Year 1 to 8 students, with a roll of 219 as of October 2025. It opened in 1921 as Roseneath Side School.

Kilbirnie School is also a co-educational state primary school, for Year 1 to 6 students, with a roll of 204. It opened in 1884.

=== Other education ===
The nearest intermediate school is Evans Bay Intermediate School in Kilbirnie.

The nearest state secondary schools are Rongotai College (single-sex boys' school) in Rongotai, and Wellington East Girls' College (single-sex girls' school) in Mt Victoria. There are also two state-integrated Catholic secondary schools nearby: St Patrick's College (for boys) and St Catherine's College (for girls), both in Kilbirnie.

The suburb also has a playcentre and two kindergartens.
