= Kilbirnie, New Zealand =

Suburb of Wellington City, New Zealand

Kilbirnie
- Suburb
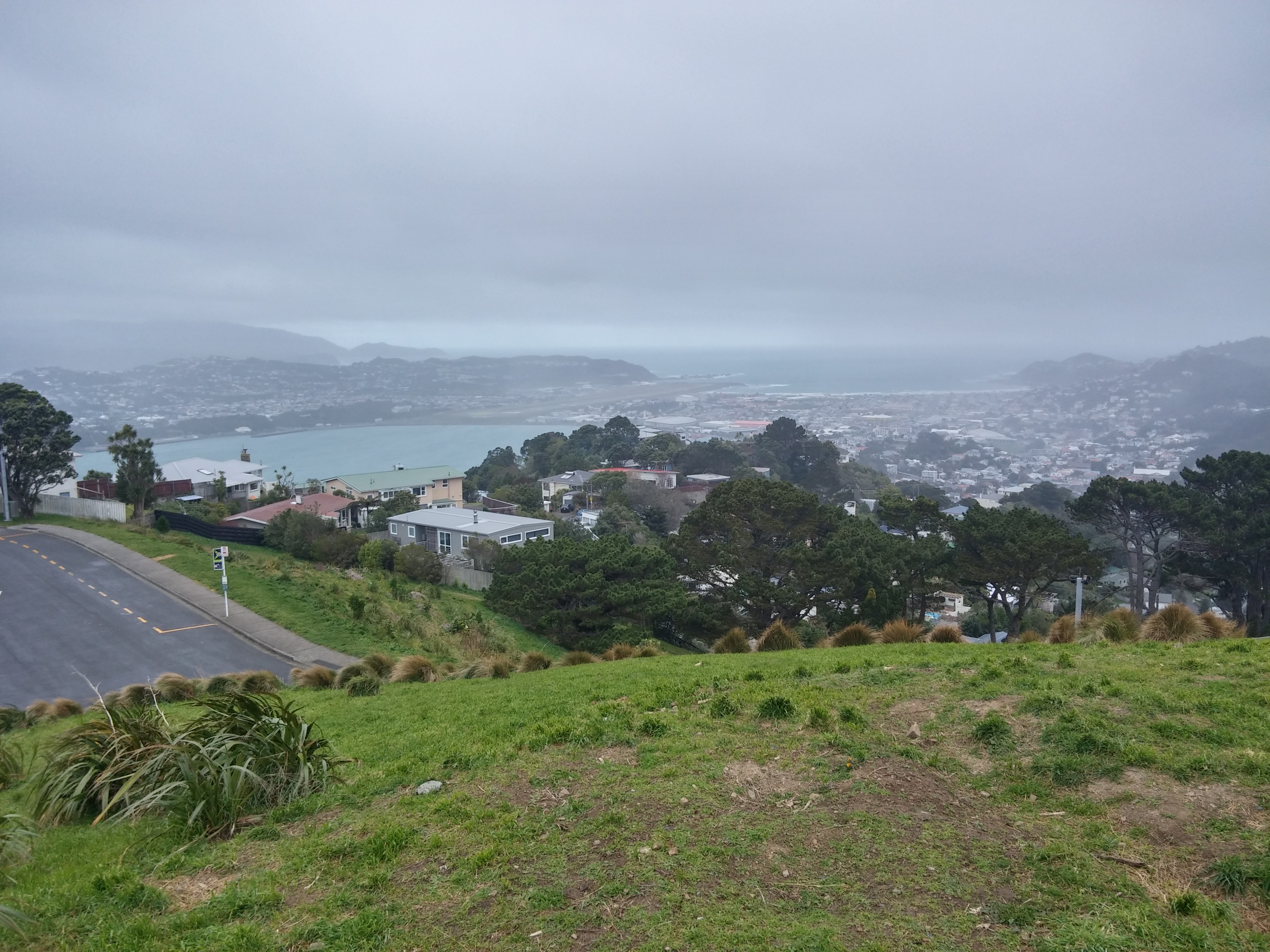
- Interactive map of Kilbirnie
- Coordinates: 41°19′13″S 174°47′39″E
- Country: New Zealand
- City: Wellington City
- Local authority: Wellington City Council
- Electoral ward: Motukairangi/Eastern Ward; Te Whanganui-a-Tara Māori Ward

Area
  - Land: 145 ha (360 acres)

Population (June 2025)
  - Total: 4,770
  - Density: 3,290/km^{2} (8,520/sq mi)

Hataitai	Evans Bay	Rongotai
Melrose	Kilbirnie	Rongotai
Lyall Bay	Lyall Bay	Rongotai

Kilbirnie is a suburb of Wellington in New Zealand, 3 kilometres (1.9 mi) to the south-east of the city centre. Travellers can reach Kilbirnie from the Wellington central business district via the Mount Victoria Tunnel and Hataitai, or over Mount Victoria, or around the coast.

Kilbirnie sits on the eastern flank of the ridge which becomes Mount Victoria and on the flat of the Rongotai isthmus between Evans Bay to the north (part of Port Nicholson) and Lyall Bay to the south (on Cook Strait). No clear boundaries separate Kilbirnie from Rongotai and Lyall Bay. To the west, the Town Belt separates Kilbirnie from Newtown, and Wellington Road marks the northern boundary of the suburb.

== Etymology ==
Kilbirnie takes its name from the town of Kilbirnie in Scotland. It was named by Coutts Crawford, who initially owned the land. Two streets in the area are named after him, and others are named after his son Henry Duncan Crawford.

== History ==
In the 1880s Kilbirnie was remote and isolated from Wellington due to the rough terrain and lack of transportation.

== Activities ==
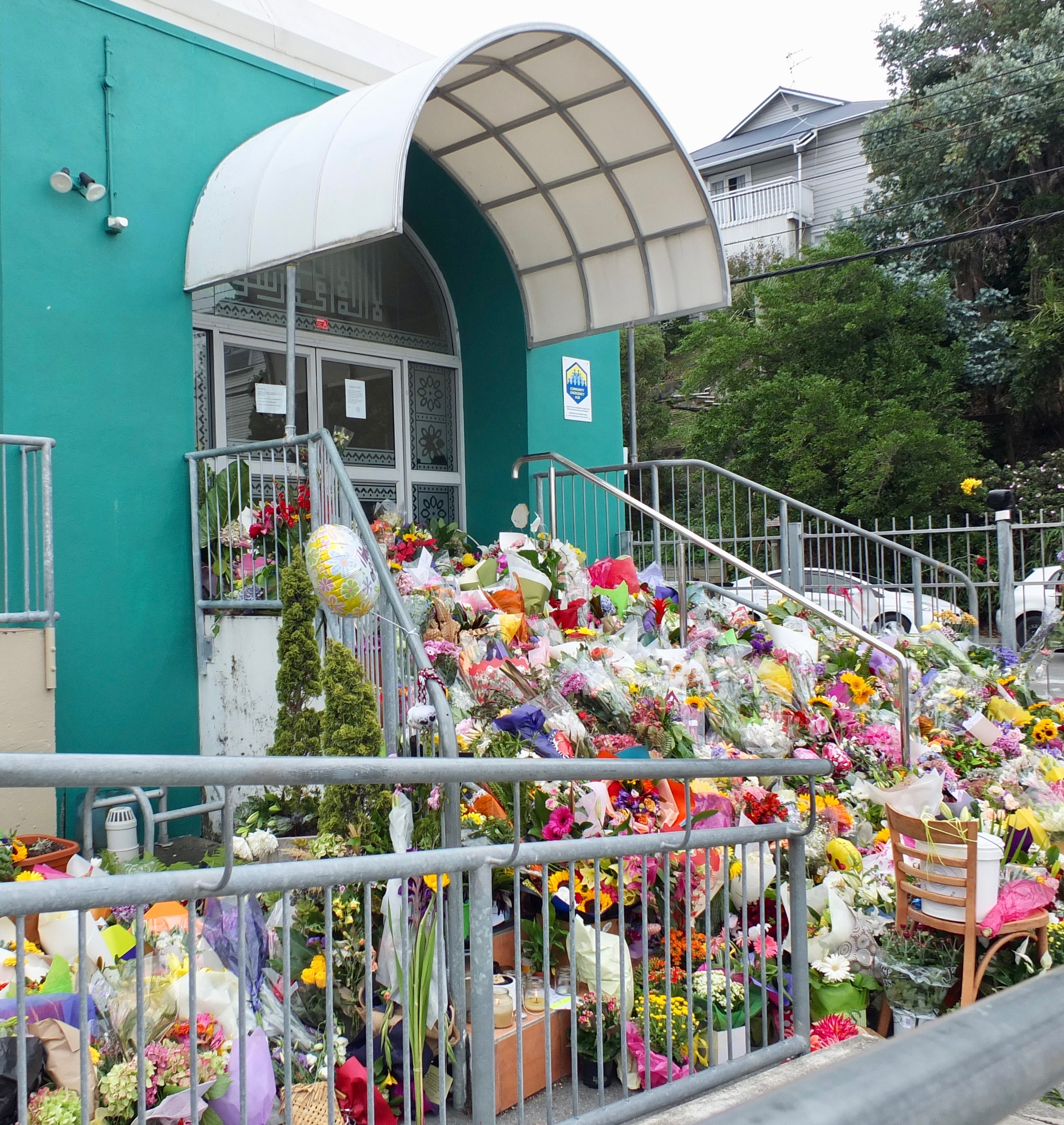
Flowers left outside the Islamic Centre in Kilbirnie, Wellington, following the Christchurch mosque attacks

The suburb features a shopping area, the Wellington Regional Aquatic Centre, the Ākau Tangi Sports Centre (formerly the ASB Sports Centre), a recreation centre, a public library, and a sports field, Kilbirnie Park.

Kilbirnie hosts the only mosque in Wellington City. There is also a Hindu temple located in Kilbirnie, which serves as the headquarters for the Wellington Indian Association. There is a catholic church, St Patrick's, next to St Patrick's primary school in Childers Terrace. St Giles church in Kilbirnie Crescent was used for Presbyterian services until 2013 and after that served the Niuean community, but it closed in 2019 due to earthquake risk and was later demolished to make way for an apartment block.

The majority of the population live in single-storey dwellings, but with a growing population, a business centre and proximity to the airport and to the city centre, the suburb also has a few hotels and apartment buildings, such as the Brentwood Hotel, 747 Motel and Rongotai Apartments.

== Sport ==
Kilbirnie Park is home to Poneke Football Club, Poneke Kilbirnie Softball Club, Eastern Suburbs Cricket Club and Marist Association Football Club. Kilbirnie Bowling Club was situated adjacent to Kilbirnie Park but closed and was demolished around 2018. As of February 2021 Wellington City Council had plans to landscape the site. Kilbirnie Tennis Club has courts in Crawford Road.

The ASB Sports Centre opened in Kilbirnie in 2011. In November 2022 it was renamed as Ākau Tangi Sports Centre, reflecting an early name for the coastline along the head of Evans Bay.

== Demographics ==
Kilbirnie, comprising the statistical areas of Kilbirnie Central and Kilbirnie East, covers 1.45 km^{2} (0.56 sq mi). It had an estimated population of 4,770 as of June 2025, with a population density of 3,290 people per km^{2}.

Historical population
Year	Pop.	±% p.a.
2006	4,890	—
2013	4,803	−0.26%
2018	4,842	+0.16%
2023	4,701	−0.59%

Kilbirnie Central had a population of 4,701 in the 2023 New Zealand census, a decrease of 141 people (−2.9%) since the 2018 census, and a decrease of 102 people (−2.1%) since the 2013 census. There were 2,256 males, 2,379 females, and 63 people of other genders in 1,938 dwellings. 8.3% of people identified as LGBTIQ+. There were 588 people (12.5%) aged under 15 years, 1,161 (24.7%) aged 15 to 29, 2,187 (46.5%) aged 30 to 64, and 762 (16.2%) aged 65 or older.

People could identify as more than one ethnicity. The results were 65.2% European (Pākehā); 12.8% Māori; 9.6% Pasifika; 22.8% Asian; 5.4% Middle Eastern, Latin American and African New Zealanders (MELAA); and 1.7% other, which includes people giving their ethnicity as "New Zealander". English was spoken by 94.9%, Māori by 3.4%, Samoan by 3.3%, and other languages by 26.0%. No language could be spoken by 1.7% (e.g. too young to talk). New Zealand Sign Language was known by 0.6%. The percentage of people born overseas was 34.2, compared with 28.8% nationally.

Religious affiliations were 30.1% Christian, 6.4% Hindu, 3.7% Islam, 0.4% Māori religious beliefs, 1.6% Buddhist, 0.6% New Age, 0.3% Jewish, and 2.0% other religions. People who answered that they had no religion were 49.2%, and 5.9% of people did not answer the census question.

Of those at least 15 years old, 1,548 (37.6%) people had a bachelor's or higher degree, 1,638 (39.8%) had a post-high school certificate or diploma, and 939 (22.8%) people exclusively held high school qualifications. 606 people (14.7%) earned over $100,000 compared to 12.1% nationally. The employment status of those at least 15 was 2,214 (53.8%) full-time, 477 (11.6%) part-time, and 132 (3.2%) unemployed.

Individual statistical areas
Name	Area (km^{2})	Population	Density (per km^{2})	Dwellings	Median age	Median income
Kilbirnie Central	0.97	2,613	2,694	1,152	37.5 years	$43,800
Kilbirnie East	0.48	2,088	4,350	786	37.3 years	$43,900
New Zealand					38.1 years	$41,500

== Education ==
=== Public schools ===
The nearest primary schools are Kilbirnie School in Hataitai to the north and Lyall Bay School to the south.

Evans Bay Intermediate School is a co-educational state intermediate school for Year 7 and 8 students, with a roll of 336 as of July 2026. It opened in 1964.

The nearest secondary school is Rongotai College (for boys only) in Rongotai.

=== Catholic schools ===
St Patrick's School is a co-educational state-integrated Catholic primary school for Year 1 to 6 students, with a roll of 125 as of July 2026. It opened in 1925.

The nearby St Catherine's College is a girls' state-integrated Catholic secondary school for Year 9 to 13 students, founded in 1950. It has a roll of 209.

St Patrick's College (Kilbirnie) is a boys' state-integrated Catholic secondary school for Year 9 to 13 students, founded in 1885. with a roll of 717.
