= Mount Victoria (Wellington suburb) =

Suburb of Wellington City, New Zealand

- Suburb
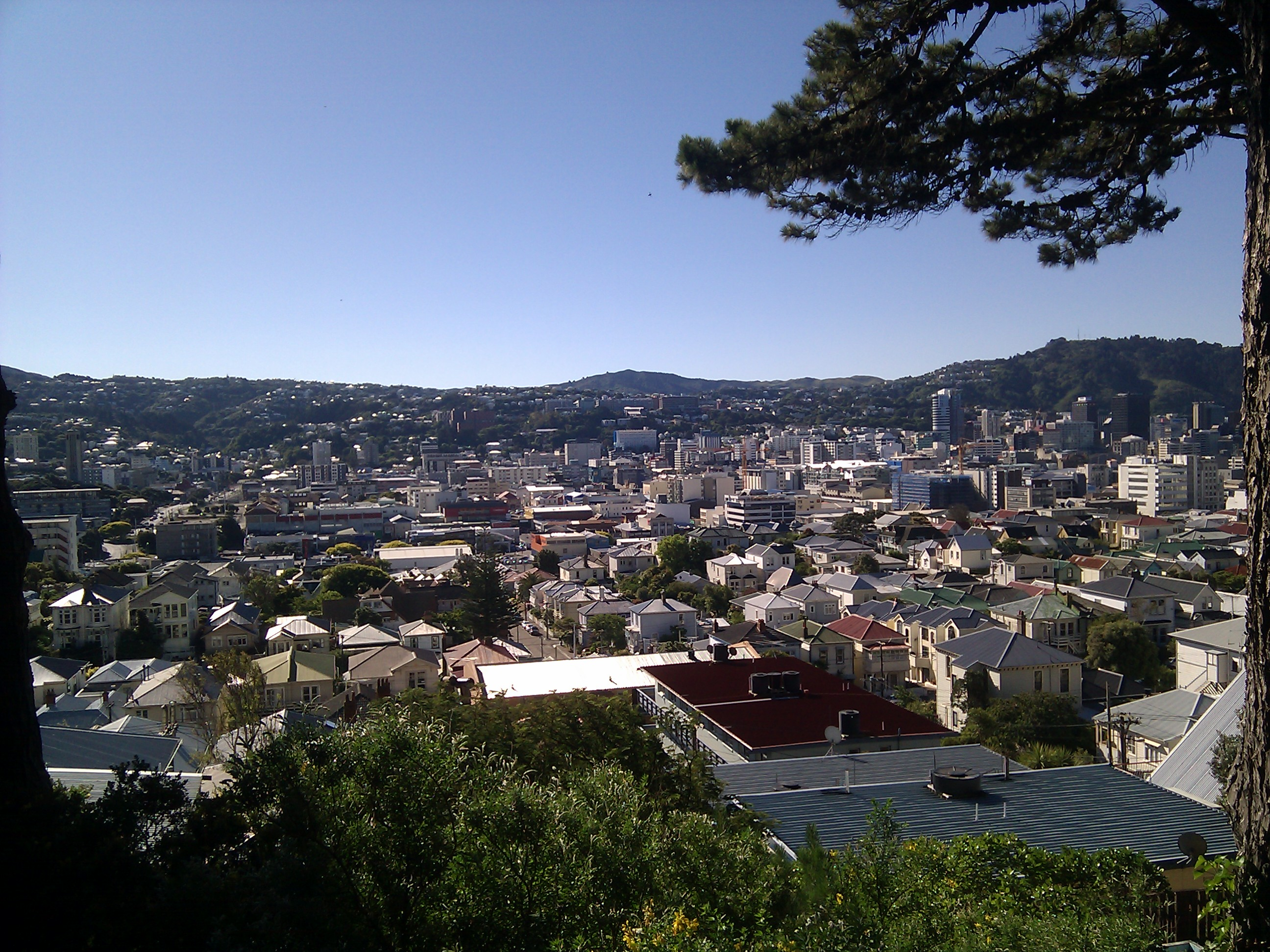
- View of the suburb of Mount Victoria, with Armour Avenue just left of centre and Te Aro in the background
- Interactive map of Mount Victoria
- Coordinates: 41°17′46″S 174°47′06″E
- Country: New Zealand
- City: Wellington City
- Local authority: Wellington City Council
- Electoral ward: Pukehīnau/Lambton Ward; Te Whanganui-a-Tara Māori Ward

Area
  - Land: 108 ha (270 acres)

Population (June 2025)
  - Total: 4,620
  - Density: 4,280/km^{2} (11,100/sq mi)

	Oriental Bay's Oriental Parade	Oriental Bay and Roseneath
Te Aro	Mount Victoria	Hataitai
Mount Cook	Newtown

Mount Victoria is a suburb of central Wellington, New Zealand, named after the 196 metres (643 ft) hill Mount Victoria to the east. Mount Victoria's residential area is on its north-western slopes.

== History ==
It was settled as, at its foot, Wellington's Te Aro filled with commercial activities. Residents needed to be close to the city but wanted more comfortable surroundings. For a long time, it was one of Wellington's sources of fresh milk from its dairy farms.

== Demographics ==
Mount Victoria covers 1.08 km^{2} (0.42 sq mi). It had an estimated population of 4,620 as of June 2025, with a population density of 4,278 people per km^{2}.

Historical population
Year	Pop.	±% p.a.
2006	4,338	—
2013	4,398	+0.20%
2018	4,527	+0.58%
2023	4,374	−0.69%

Mount Victoria had a population of 4,374 in the 2023 New Zealand census, a decrease of 153 people (−3.4%) since the 2018 census, and a decrease of 24 people (−0.5%) since the 2013 census. There were 2,070 males, 2,235 females, and 72 people of other genders in 1,803 dwellings. 14.2% of people identified as LGBTIQ+. The median age was 31.8 years (compared with 38.1 years nationally). There were 252 people (5.8%) aged under 15 years, 1,707 (39.0%) aged 15 to 29, 1,983 (45.3%) aged 30 to 64, and 432 (9.9%) aged 65 or older.

People could identify as more than one ethnicity. The results were 80.9% European (Pākehā); 7.8% Māori; 2.4% Pasifika; 15.4% Asian; 4.0% Middle Eastern, Latin American and African New Zealanders (MELAA); and 1.9% other, which includes people giving their ethnicity as "New Zealander". English was spoken by 97.3%, Māori by 2.3%, Samoan by 0.3%, and other languages by 23.2%. No language could be spoken by 1.0% (e.g. too young to talk). New Zealand Sign Language was known by 0.5%. The percentage of people born overseas was 34.0, compared with 28.8% nationally.

Religious affiliations were 18.3% Christian, 2.0% Hindu, 0.8% Islam, 0.1% Māori religious beliefs, 1.4% Buddhist, 0.7% New Age, 0.5% Jewish, and 2.1% other religions. People who answered that they had no religion were 68.8%, and 5.3% of people did not answer the census question.

Of those at least 15 years old, 2,331 (56.6%) people had a bachelor's or higher degree, 1,350 (32.8%) had a post-high school certificate or diploma, and 441 (10.7%) people exclusively held high school qualifications. The median income was $58,900, compared with $41,500 nationally. 948 people (23.0%) earned over $100,000 compared to 12.1% nationally. The employment status of those at least 15 was 2,658 (64.5%) full-time, 624 (15.1%) part-time, and 138 (3.3%) unemployed.

Individual statistical areas
Name	Area (km^{2})	Population	Density (per km^{2})	Dwellings	Median age	Median income
Mount Victoria North	0.57	2,778	4,874	1,197	32.7 years	$60,700
Mount Victoria South	0.52	1,596	3,129	606	30.3 years	$56,100
New Zealand					38.1 years	$41,500

== Features ==
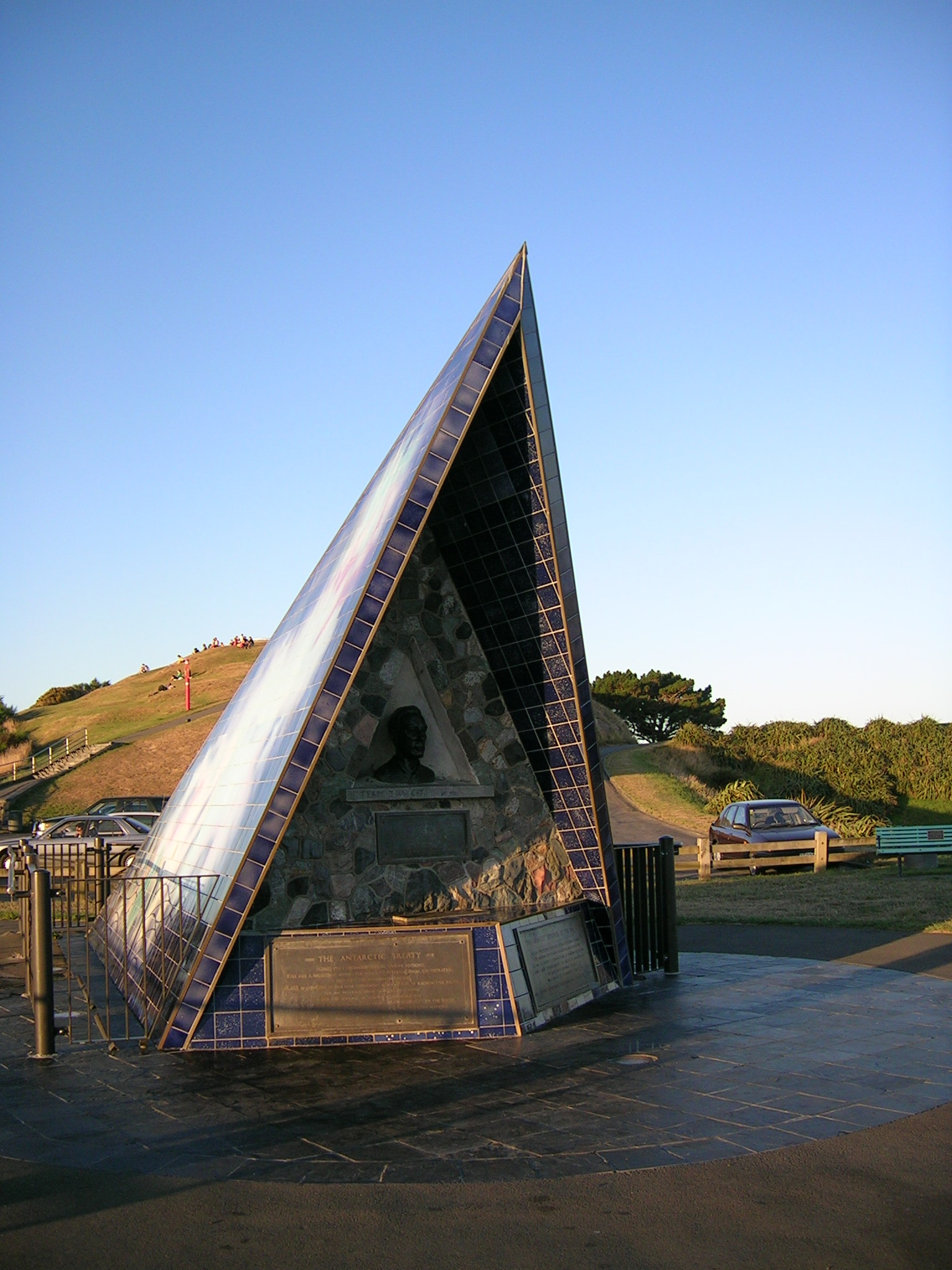
Byrd Memorial

The Byrd Memorial erected in 1962 to polar explorer Richard E. Byrd is by the peak of Mount Victoria.

The Hataitai Bus Tunnel and the Mount Victoria Tunnel (State Highway 1) run beneath the ridge of Mount Victoria, connecting the central city with Wellington International Airport, Evans Bay and the Miramar Peninsula.

Mount Victoria's churches include the notable Greek Orthodox Cathedral of The Annunciation of the Virgin Mary on Hania Street, St Mark's in Dufferin Street with its school and the Catholic St Gerard's Church and its former monastery in Hawker Street and the Catholic parish church, St Joseph's, in Ellice Street.

=== Town belt ===
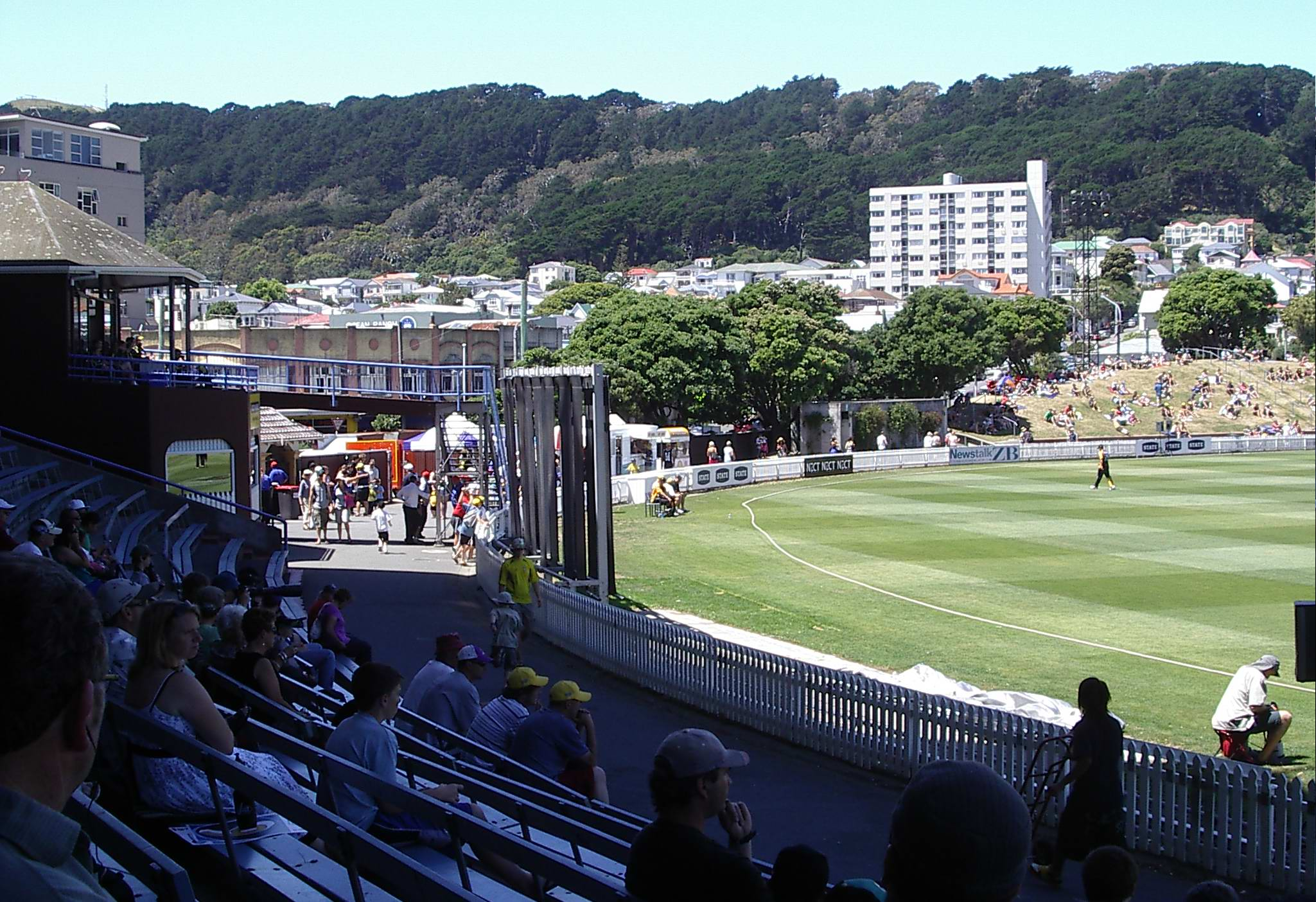
Mount Victoria and the town belt from the Basin Reserve

Much of Mount Victoria is part of the Wellington Town Belt, a series of park land originally granted to the city in 1873 for public recreation. The vegetation in the area is dominated by pines and macrocarpa planted in the “plantation years” from the late 1800s to early 1900s, though efforts have been made in recent years to plant more native vegetation, which has attracted the New Zealand kākā back to the area. The area features many tracks used for walking and mountain biking.

The Mount Victoria Lookout is situated within the Town Belt, and offers panoramic views of the greater Wellington area. Not far to its east is the Mount Victoria Radio Tower, which was Wellington's main radio and television mast from 1927 until 1965, when the larger and more powerful Mount Kaukau transmitter opened.

=== Greek community ===
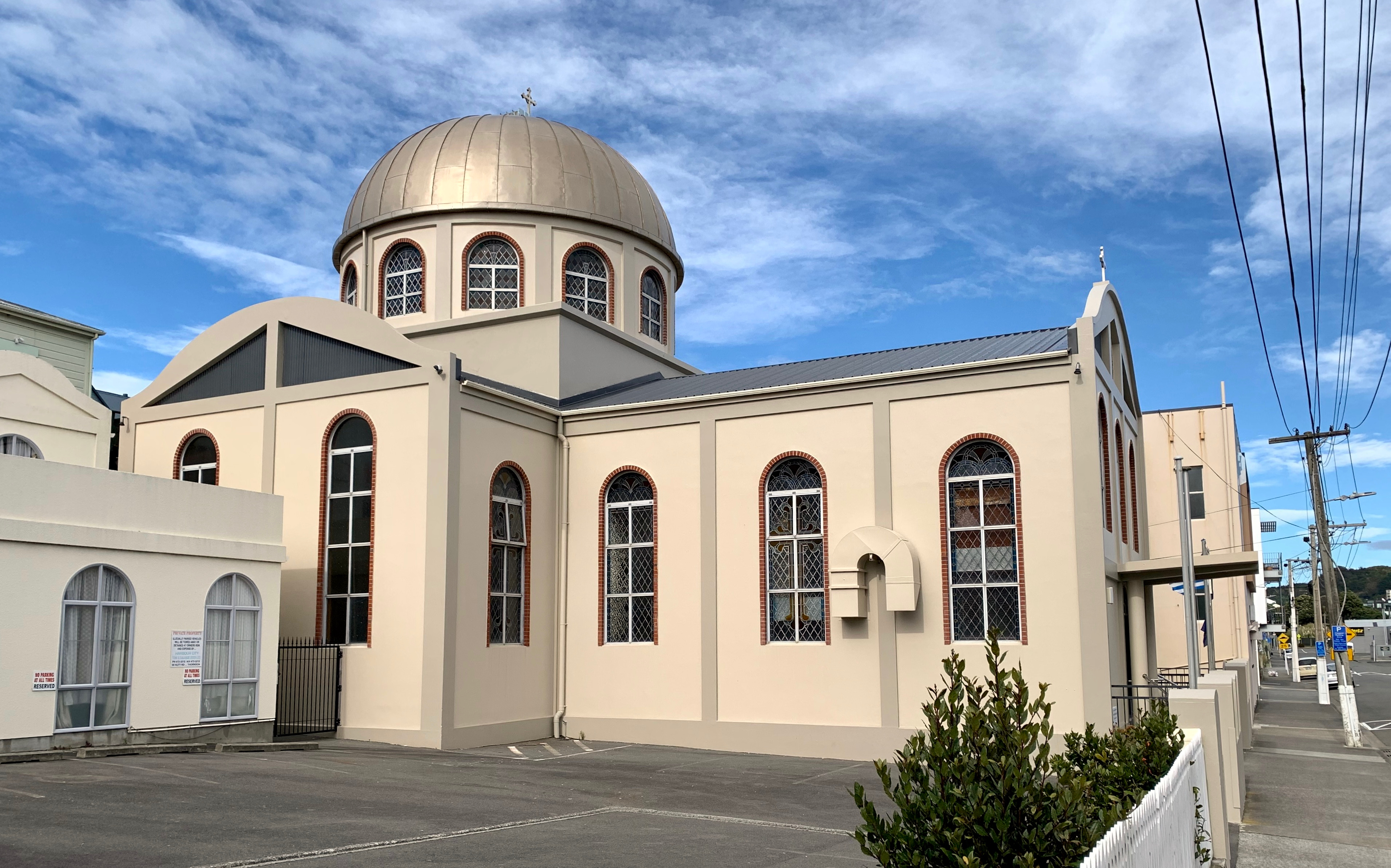
The Cathedral of the Annunciation of the Virgin Mary (Theotokos)

A strong link was forged between Cretans and New Zealanders during World War II. New Zealanders left behind in the retreat from Crete were hidden from the occupying army by Cretans at great personal danger and they were able to harass occupying forces. A commemoration of the Battle of Crete is held each year in May.

Lloyd Street which is the site of the Greek community centre and the Greek Orthodox Cathedral was renamed Hania Street after Crete's old capital. Wellington's Olympic Football Club was established by Father Ilias Economou for his parishioners.

About 65 per cent of Greek New Zealanders live in Wellington and in the decades following World War II they were concentrated in Mount Victoria. The greatest concentration is now in Miramar and around half of Greek weddings are now with other New Zealanders.

=== Boundaries ===
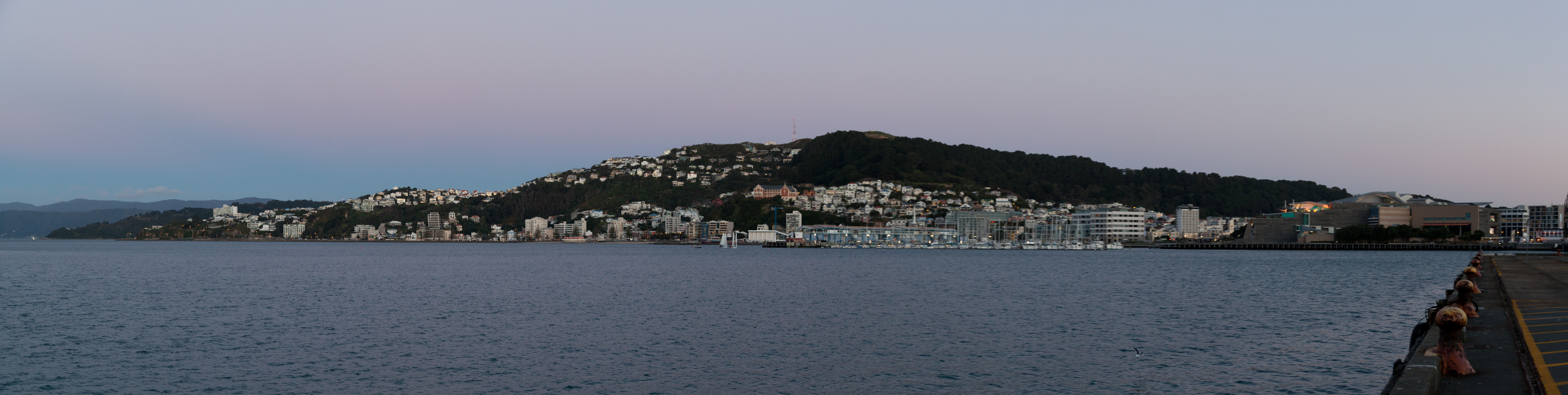
Mount Victoria to the left of its summit —Roseneath and Oriental Bay to the right —residential Mount Victoria and far right —the National Museum, Te Papa

The suburb is almost entirely residential with commercial activity along Kent Terrace on its north-western boundary. The houses are on the north-western flank of the ridge above the southern end of the Wellington CBD, Te Aro. Adjoining suburbs are Oriental Bay with Roseneath, Newtown to the south, Te Aro to the west beyond Kent Terrace and Hataitai on the far side of the ridge beyond the town belt.

Waterfront

What would seem to be residential Mount Victoria's frontage to the harbour is now technically a one-building-wide strip of Oriental Bay. The houses in Roxburgh, McFarlane, Hawker and Moeller Streets are all in Mount Victoria. The houses below those streets front onto Oriental Parade which is defined as Oriental Bay. The old monastery is in Mount Victoria. Palliser Road is in Roseneath.

Wellington College and Government House, official residence of New Zealand's Governor-General, are beyond the southern boundary to the south-east of cricket's Basin Reserve. Beyond Government House is Newtown's Wellington Hospital.

Houses

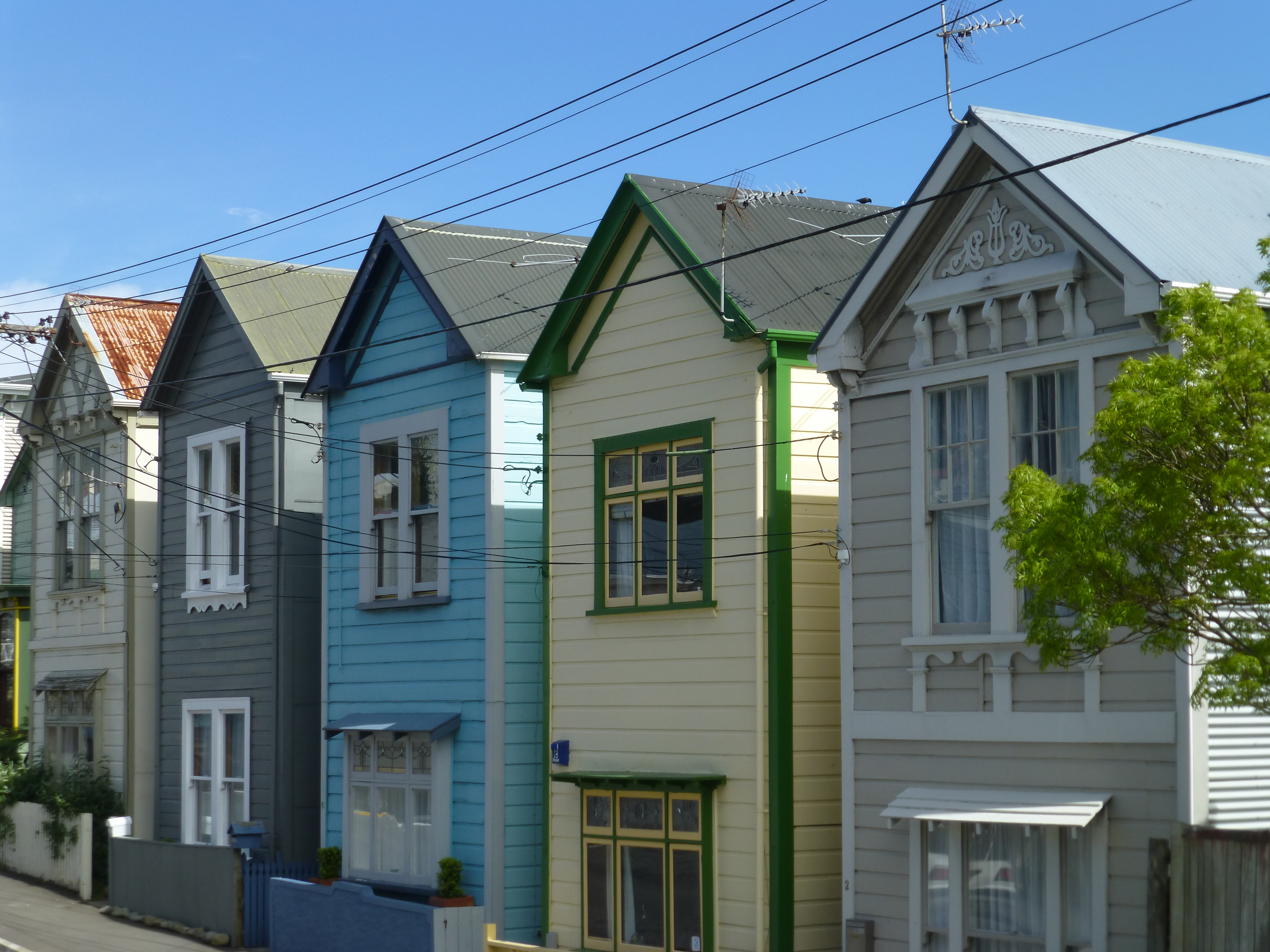

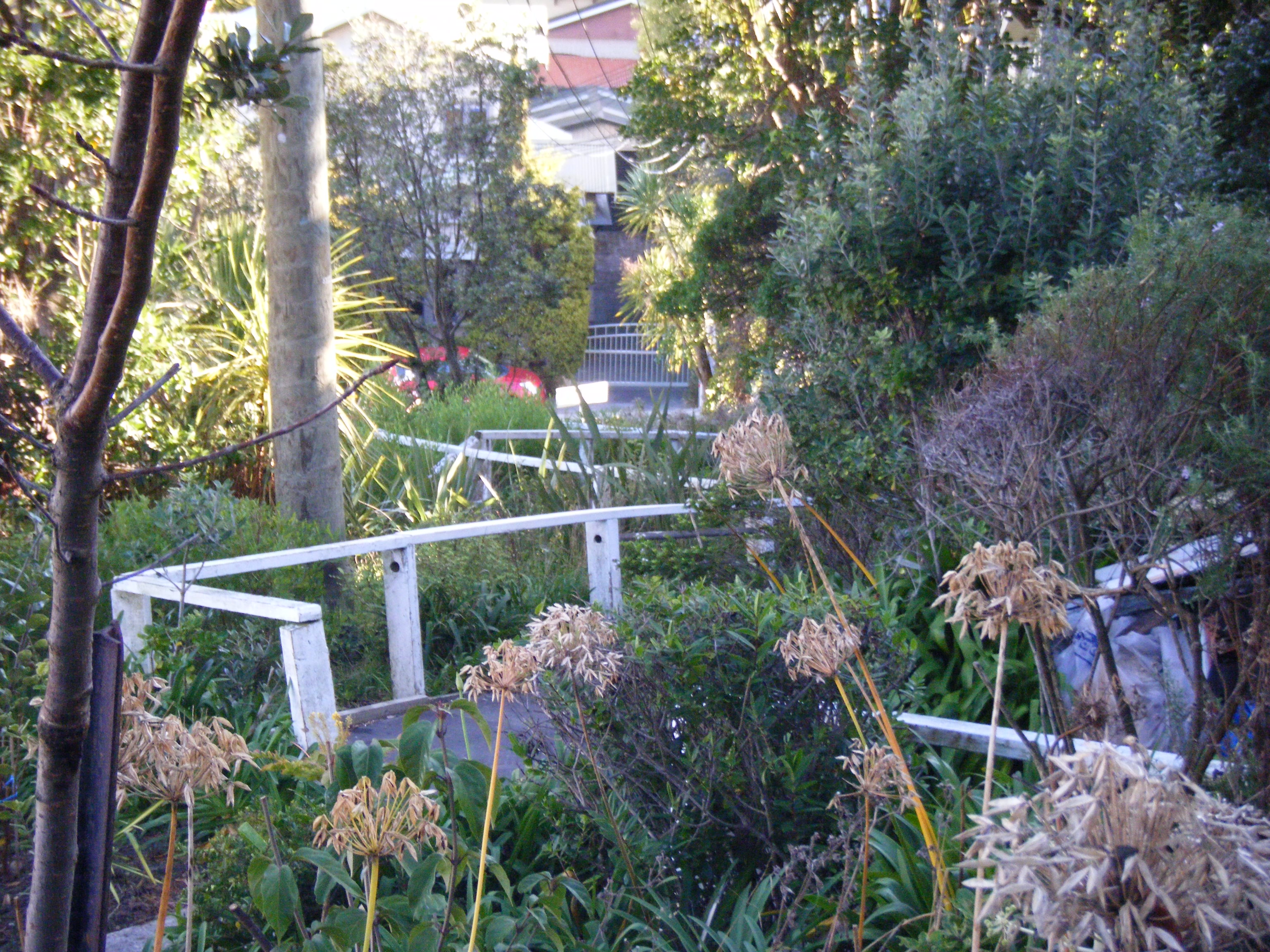

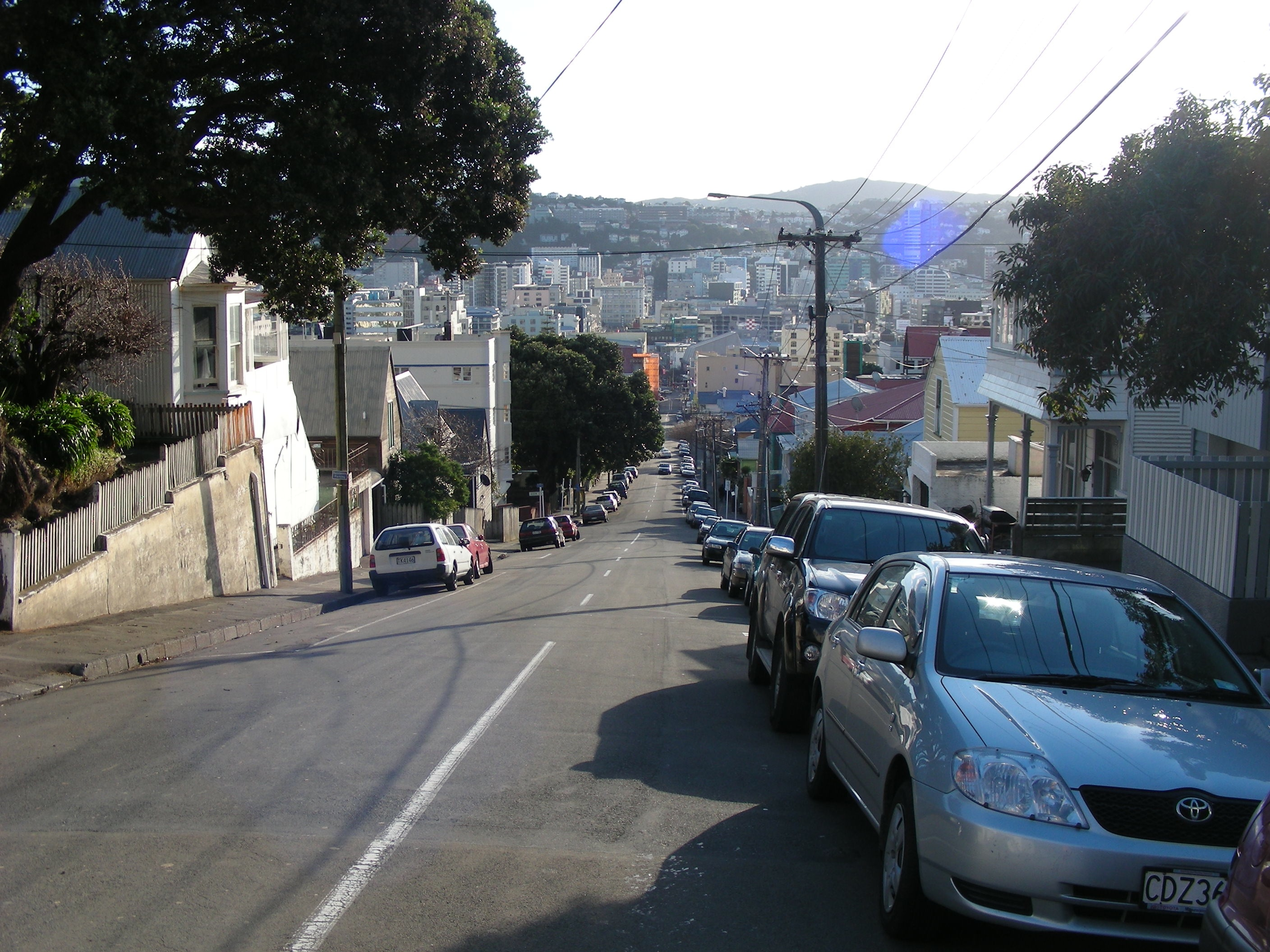

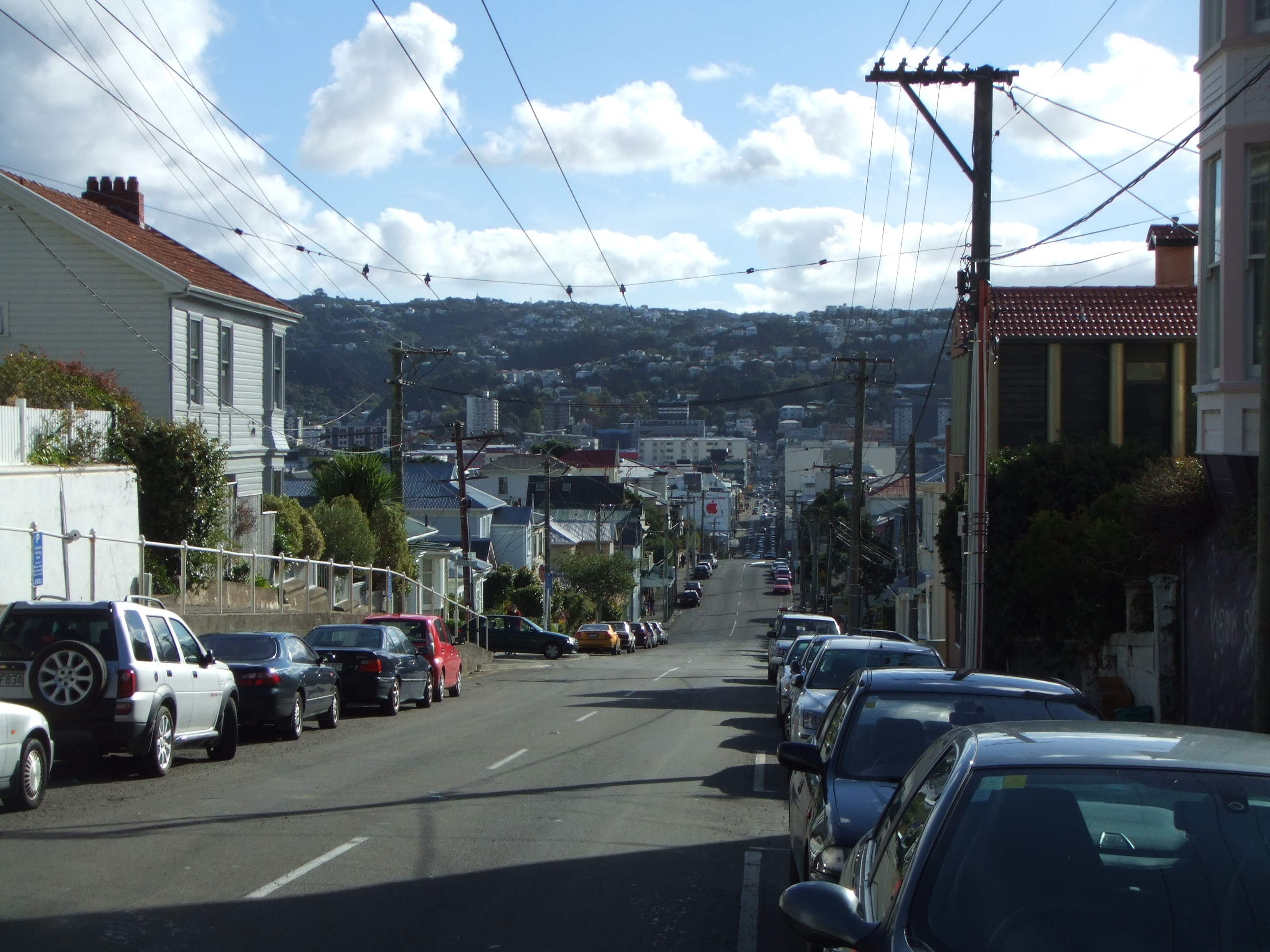

== Education ==
=== Primary schools ===
Clyde Quay School is a co-educational state primary school for Year 1 to 8 students, with a roll of 207 as of March 2026. It opened in 1889 near Clyde Key. The infant department moved to Elizabeth Street in Mount Victoria in 1923, and the rest of the school joined it at the end of 1935 because the original site was needed for a fire station.

St Mark's Church School is a co-educational Anglican private primary school for Year 1 to 8 students, with a roll of 139 as of March 2026. It opened in 1917.

=== Secondary schools ===
Wellington College is a boys' state secondary school for Year 9 to 13 students, founded in 1867. It has a roll of 1,935 as of March 2026. It opened in Woodward Street in 1867 and moved to the current site in 1874.

Wellington East Girls' College is a girls' state secondary school for Year 9 to 13 students, founded in 1925. It has a roll of 1,021.
