= Mount Victoria Tunnel =

Road tunnel in Wellington, New Zealand

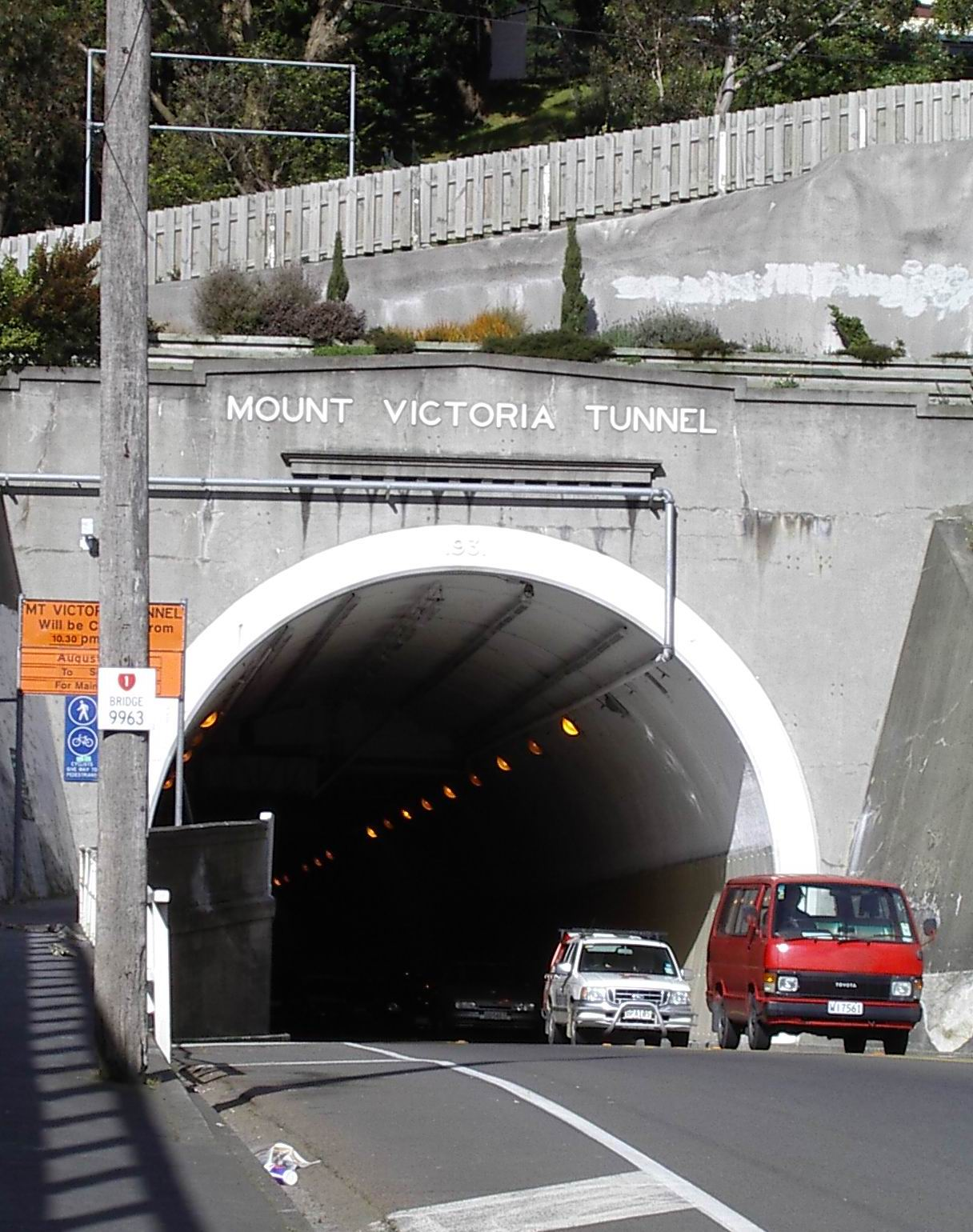
- The Mount Victoria (western) entrance to the Mount Victoria Tunnel.
- Interactive map of Mount Victoria Tunnel

Overview
- Location: Wellington City, Wellington, New Zealand
- Coordinates: 41.302921°S 174.787680°E
- Route: State Highway 1
- Start: Mount Victoria
- End: Hataitai

Operation
- Opened: 12 October 1931
- Owner: NZ Transport Agency
- Operator: New Zealand Transport Agency
- Traffic: Motor vehicles, pedestrians, cyclists

Technical
- Length: 623 metres (2,044 ft)
- No. of lanes: Two (one in each direction)
- Operating speed: 50 km/h (31 mph)

The Mount Victoria Tunnel in the New Zealand capital city of Wellington is 623 metres (slightly more than a third of a mile) long and 5 metres (16.4 ft) in height, connecting Hataitai to the centre of Wellington and the suburb of Mount Victoria, under the mount of the same name. It is part of State Highway 1.

== History ==
The tunnel was built in 15 months (Note: The 15 months that elapsed during the construction project meant that it finished three months ahead of schedule.) by the Hansford and Mills Construction Company. The project cost around £132,000 (NZ$264,000) and greatly reduced travel time between the Eastern Suburbs and the central business district of Wellington.

Construction employed a standard tunnel-excavation technique in which two teams of diggers begin on either side of the obstacle to be tunnelled through, eventually meeting in the centre.

The initial breakthrough, when the two separate teams of diggers met, occurred at 2.30pm on 31 May 1930, and the first people to pass through the breakthrough were tunnellers Philip Gilbert and Alfred Graham. The tunnel was opened officially by the mayor of Wellington, Thomas Hislop, on 12 October 1931.

Although the tunnel has been eclipsed in terms of features and amenities by more recent tunnels around the country, such as the Terrace Motorway Tunnel, the Mount Victoria Tunnel was the first road tunnel in New Zealand to be mechanically ventilated.

There has been a long-standing designation for a second parallel tunnel to the north, in order to relieve peak period congestion resulting from lane merges at both ends of the tunnel. A pilot tunnel was bored through in 1974 to investigate the technical feasibility and still exists, although the eastern end has been bricked up and the western end lies on private property. Plans to build the second tunnel paralleled the original plan to complete the Wellington Urban Motorway to the tunnel to provide a motorway bypass of the whole of central Wellington. The second tunnel component was shelved indefinitely in 1981 when budget cuts meant that a scaled-down motorway extension was proposed that would terminate at the existing tunnel.

Since that date there have been no serious proposals to duplicate the existing tunnel, although cost estimates for such work were at $40 million in the mid-1980s. Traffic lights have been installed at the end of the city approach to the tunnel to ease congestion and improve safety at the Basin Reserve roundabout. Mount Victoria Tunnel became part of State Highway 1 in 1997 when Transit New Zealand designated the road from Wellington Airport to the Basin Reserve a State Highway. The NZ Transport Agency has no plans in the next ten years to duplicate the tunnel, but plans to investigate work to upgrade the city approaches around the Basin Reserve, including a possible flyover to Buckle Street, to reduce congestion at the city end of the tunnel and around the Basin Reserve. A study is currently underway (The Ngauranga to Airport Study) investigating long-term transport options for the route. The study indicates that a new tunnel would cost around (NZ)$170 million.

During World War II, the government planned to use the tunnel as an air raid shelter if Wellington were attacked. However, the plan was scrapped, as the tunnel was thought to be too vulnerable to assault from either side by hostile troops.

=== Murder ===
A well-known local story revolves around a murder that occurred during the construction of the Mount Victoria Tunnel. A young woman named Phyllis Avis Symons (17) was murdered by George Errol Coats (29), who buried her alive in the fill from the tunnel. It is suspected that the girl was pregnant by her lover and the story was later covered in the Wellington newspapers. Upon learning of the murder, police ordered workers to excavate the tunnel's fill in order to find the victim's body.. Phyllis Symons was buried in Karori Cemetery.

== Usage ==
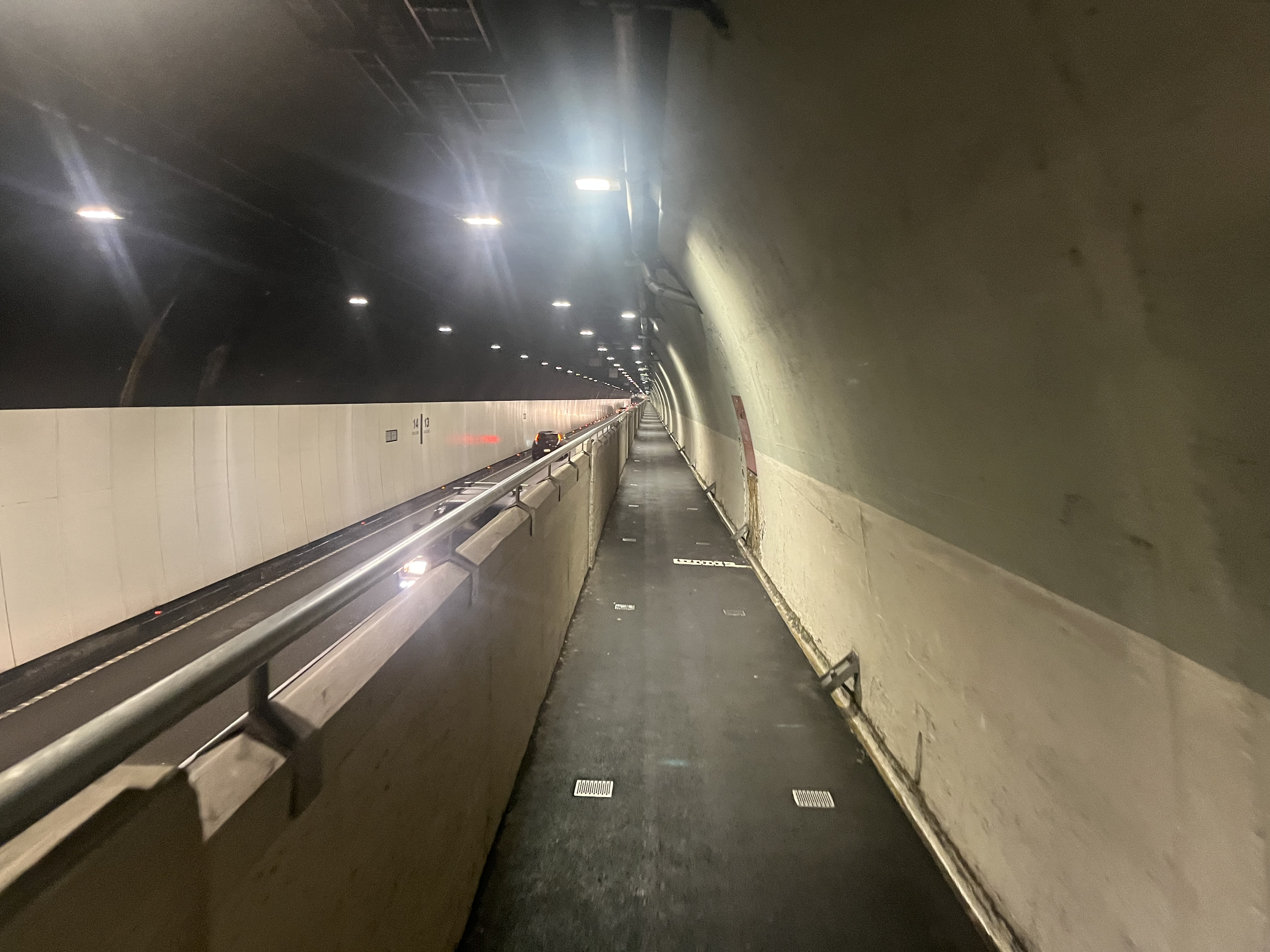
Pedestrian walk inside the Mount Victoria Tunnel

Around 45,000 vehicles pass through the Mount Victoria each day. The tunnel also accommodates pedestrians and cyclists, who use an elevated ramp on the north side of the roadway. In the late 1970s, a number of crime incidents resulted in an alarm system being installed based on buttons spaced along the length of the pedestrian ramp; the system was removed several years later, as it proved ineffective. Recent additions include new lighting, CCTV cameras, brighter cleanable side panels and pollution control. These have significantly improved safety in the tunnel.

The tunnel currently is a traffic bottleneck in the morning peak from around 7.30 to 9.00am on the Hataitai side with traffic sometimes backing up over 1 km and in the afternoon peak between 5 and 6pm on the city side with queuing back around 0.5 km. Buses to the eastern suburbs bypass this congestion by using the much-older single-lane Hataitai bus tunnel.

== Improvements ==
The tunnel received a safety overhaul in 2016. This included a repainting of the interior, replacement of lighting with LED bulbs, and ventilation improvements. The control rooms were also refurbished and an additional one was added.

=== Second tunnel ===
Following the opening of the Wellington Airport in 1959 it was identified that due to the additional traffic that this would generate a second tunnel would be needed. However it wasn't until 1974 that a approximately 2.5 metres diameter pilot tunnel was dug through the hill over a 12-month period. The intention was to expand the tunnel out to 10m over the next three years but the plans was cancelled by budget constraints and the entrance was bricked up in 1981. The NZTA still owns 31 properties which were meant to have been used for the tunnel access. In 2011, they attempted gain permission to remove some of these homes to construct a second tunnel, but faced legal roadblocks regarding the heritage nature of some of these properties, many of which were built before 1930.

More recently, the New Zealand government has proposed a second tunnel. This was initially proposed as a public transport tunnel in 2022 as part of the Let's Get Wellington Moving project. Following the 2023 general election, the new government scrapped the initiative and changed these plans into a tunnel for general traffic.

In November 2025, the New Zealand Transport Agency unveiled a proposed design for changes to State Highway 1 which would include a second Mount Victoria Tunnel. The Transport Agency stated that the proposal would cost $2.9 to $3.8 billion.

== Tooting ==
There is a tradition among Wellingtonians of "tooting"—sounding a vehicle's horn as they pass through the tunnel— leading to the local colloquial name of "Toot Tunnel". Some suggest that this began as a tribute to the murder of Phyllis Symons. The honking was referenced in an episode of the comedy series Wellington Paranormal.

== See also ==
- Terrace Motorway Tunnel
- Tunnels through Mount Victoria
