= Rongotai =

Suburb of Wellington City, New Zealand

- Suburb
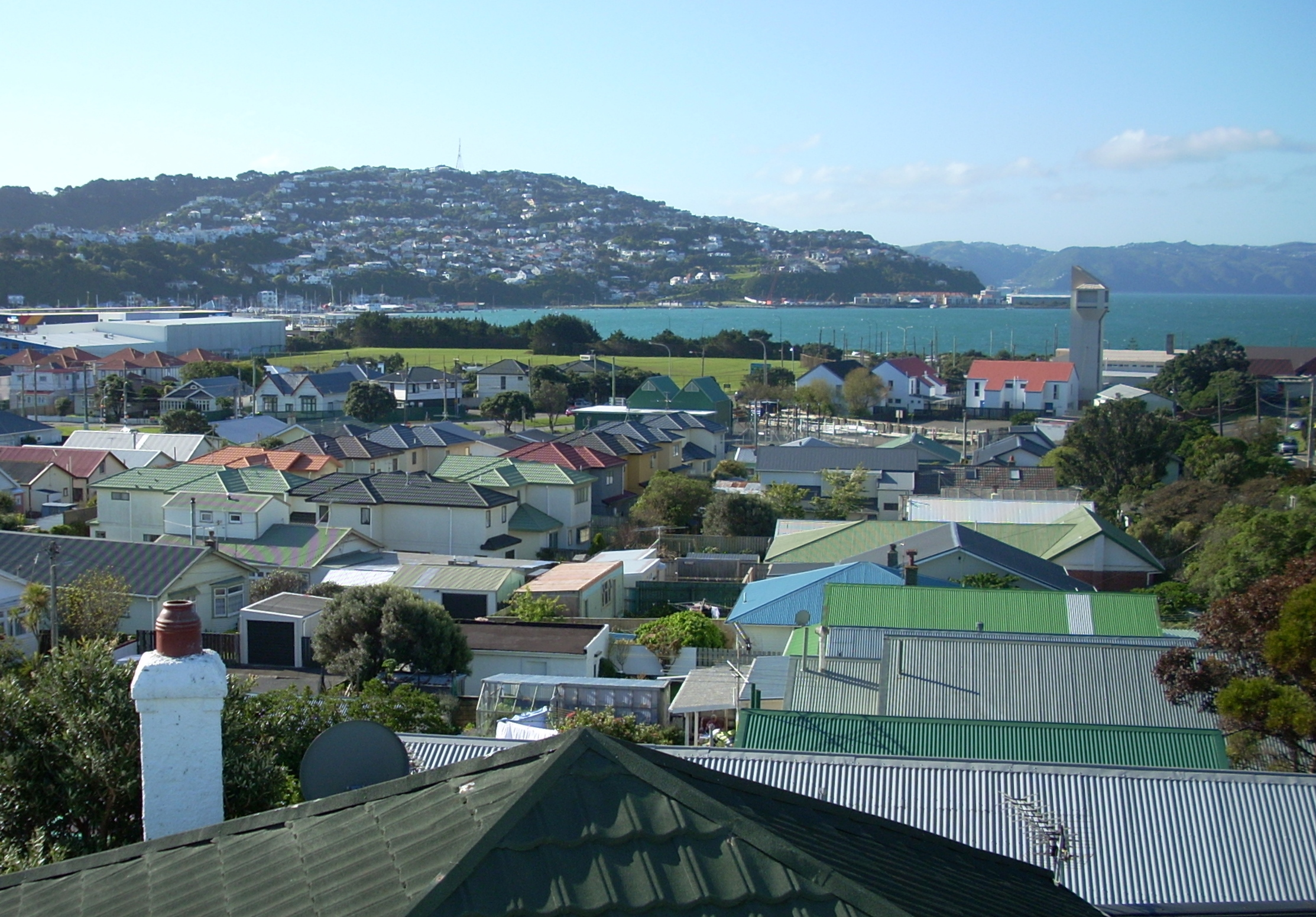
- The north-west part of Rongotai.
- Interactive map of Rongotai
- Coordinates: 41.324°S 174.804°E
- Country: New Zealand
- City: Wellington City
- Local authority: Wellington City Council
- Electoral ward: Motukairangi/Eastern Ward; Te Whanganui-a-Tara Māori Ward

Area
  - Land: 194 ha (480 acres)

Population (June 2025)
  - Total: 50
  - Density: 26/km^{2} (67/sq mi)
- Airports: Wellington Airport

Evans Bay (suburb)	Evans Bay (bay)	Maupuia
Kilbirnie	Rongotai	Miramar
Lyall Bay (suburb)	Lyall Bay (bay)	Moa Point

Rongotai is a suburb of Wellington, New Zealand, located southeast of the city centre. It is on the Rongotai isthmus, between the Miramar Peninsula and the suburbs of Kilbirnie and Lyall Bay. It is known mostly for being the location of the Wellington Airport. It is roughly in the centre of the former Rongotai electorate, which was absorbed into the larger Wellington Bays Electorate created in 2026.

The New Zealand Ministry for Culture and Heritage gives a translation of "sound of the sea" for Rongotai.

== History ==
Until about the 15th century, the Rongotai isthmus was probably a shallow channel known as Te Awa a Tia. The only part of the current isthmus above water was the small hill on Tirangi Road which previously had the airport control tower on it; the Miramar Peninsula was an island known as Te Motu Kairangi at the entrance to Wellington Harbour. Māori oral history describes a massive earthquake known as Haowhenua ("land swallower" or "land destroyer") which raised the seabed so that it became possible to wade across to Miramar. Studies of sediment suggest that it was once below sea level. Following the earthquake, the seabed seems to have silted up, creating a sandflat which linked Miramar to the mainland, at least at low tide. When James Cook entered Wellington Harbour in 1773 he found the former channel impassable by boat.

In 1855, another earthquake further lifted the isthmus so that it became permanently dry land. The southern half remained mostly sand dunes, but houses were built on the northern end, as was a coal-fired power station and Rongotai College. In 1939-1940 Rongotai became the site of the 1940 New Zealand Centennial Exhibition, which attracted more than 2.5 million people. The coal-fired power station was later closed and the site is now occupied by a fire station.

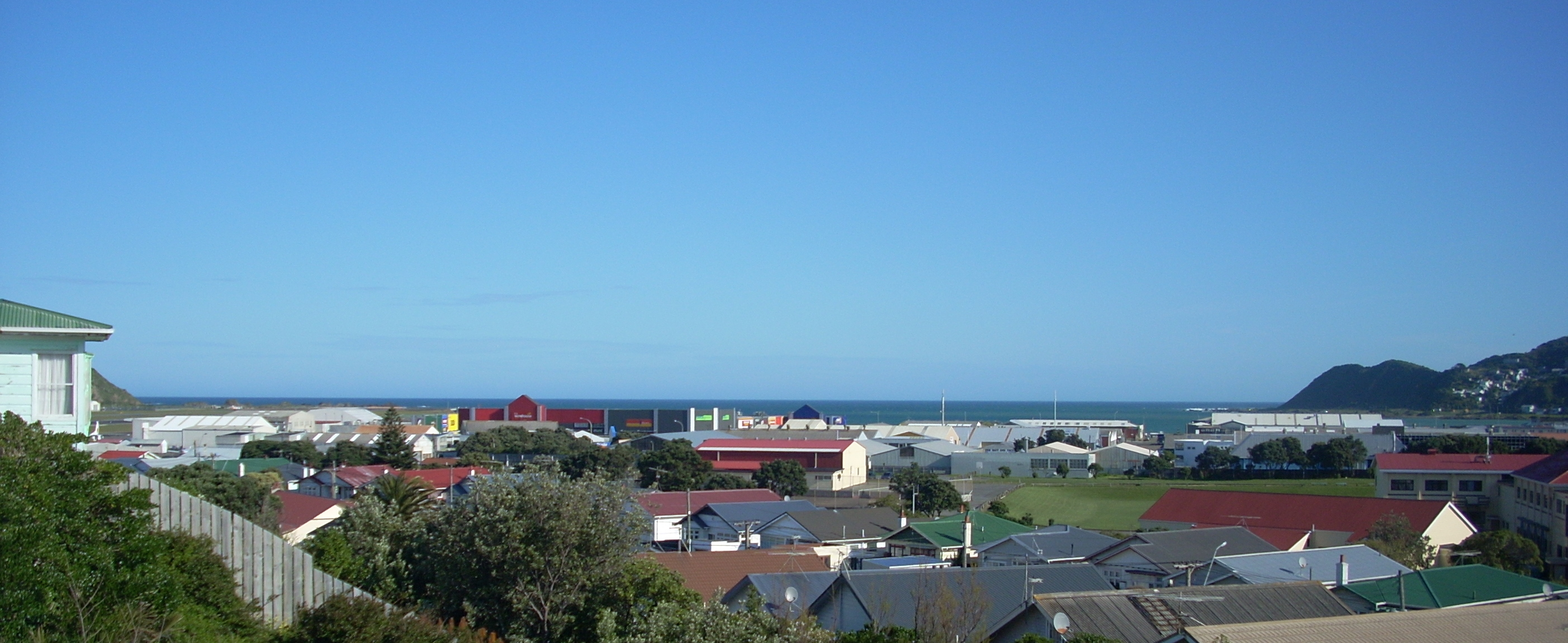
The south end of Rongotai, showing (left to right) part of the airport runway, the retail park, and part of Rongotai College.

Since the early twentieth century, the dunes had been used as a runway for light aircraft. By World War II a more permanent airfield had been built, and was used by the Royal New Zealand Air Force, who also took over the centennial buildings after the close of the exhibition. On 24 October 1959 Wellington's international airport was opened, the runway and associated buildings taking over the entire eastern half of the suburb. In the process of building the airport, 135 acres (0.55 km^{2}) of land was reclaimed and 180 houses were moved. Light industry and a Rongotai College playing field occupied most of the south-west quarter of the suburb. The north-west quarter continued to be residential apart from the college and a few corner shops. In the early 2000s the industrial section of Rongotai was transformed when an old warehouse was turned into a retail park centring on a large branch of The Warehouse (a discount store). Traffic in the area has increased dramatically.

== Demographics ==
Rongotai statistical area, which includes Moa Point, covers 1.94 km^{2} (0.75 sq mi). It had an estimated population of 50 as of June 2025, with a population density of 26 people per km^{2}.

Historical population
Year	Pop.	±% p.a.
2006	63	—
2013	63	+0.00%
2018	48	−5.29%
2023	48	+0.00%

Rongotai had a population of 48 in the 2023 New Zealand census, unchanged since the 2018 census, and a decrease of 15 people (−23.8%) since the 2013 census. There were 24 males and 21 females in 27 dwellings. 12.5% of people identified as LGBTIQ+. The median age was 48.6 years (compared with 38.1 years nationally). There were 6 people (12.5%) aged under 15 years, 6 (12.5%) aged 15 to 29, 27 (56.2%) aged 30 to 64, and 9 (18.8%) aged 65 or older.

People could identify as more than one ethnicity. The results were 81.2% European (Pākehā); 6.2% Māori; 6.2% Pasifika; 18.8% Asian; 6.2% Middle Eastern, Latin American and African New Zealanders (MELAA); and 12.5% other, which includes people giving their ethnicity as "New Zealander". English was spoken by 93.8%, and other languages by 25.0%. The percentage of people born overseas was 37.5, compared with 28.8% nationally.

Religious affiliations were 31.2% Christian, 18.8% Islam, and 6.2% New Age. People who answered that they had no religion were 31.2%.

Of those at least 15 years old, 15 (35.7%) people had a bachelor's or higher degree, 21 (50.0%) had a post-high school certificate or diploma, and 6 (14.3%) people exclusively held high school qualifications. The median income was $32,200, compared with $41,500 nationally. 9 people (21.4%) earned over $100,000 compared to 12.1% nationally. The employment status of those at least 15 was 18 (42.9%) full-time, 6 (14.3%) part-time, and 6 (14.3%) unemployed.

== Education ==
Rongotai College is a single-sex (boys) state secondary school for Year 9 to 13 students, founded in 1928. It has a roll of 732 as of March 2026. Girls living in the Rongotai area are zoned to attend Wellington East Girls' College or Wellington High School.
