= Evans Bay =

Bay in Wellington, New Zealand

- Ākau Tangi (Māori); Kokotahi-te-Taniwha (Māori)
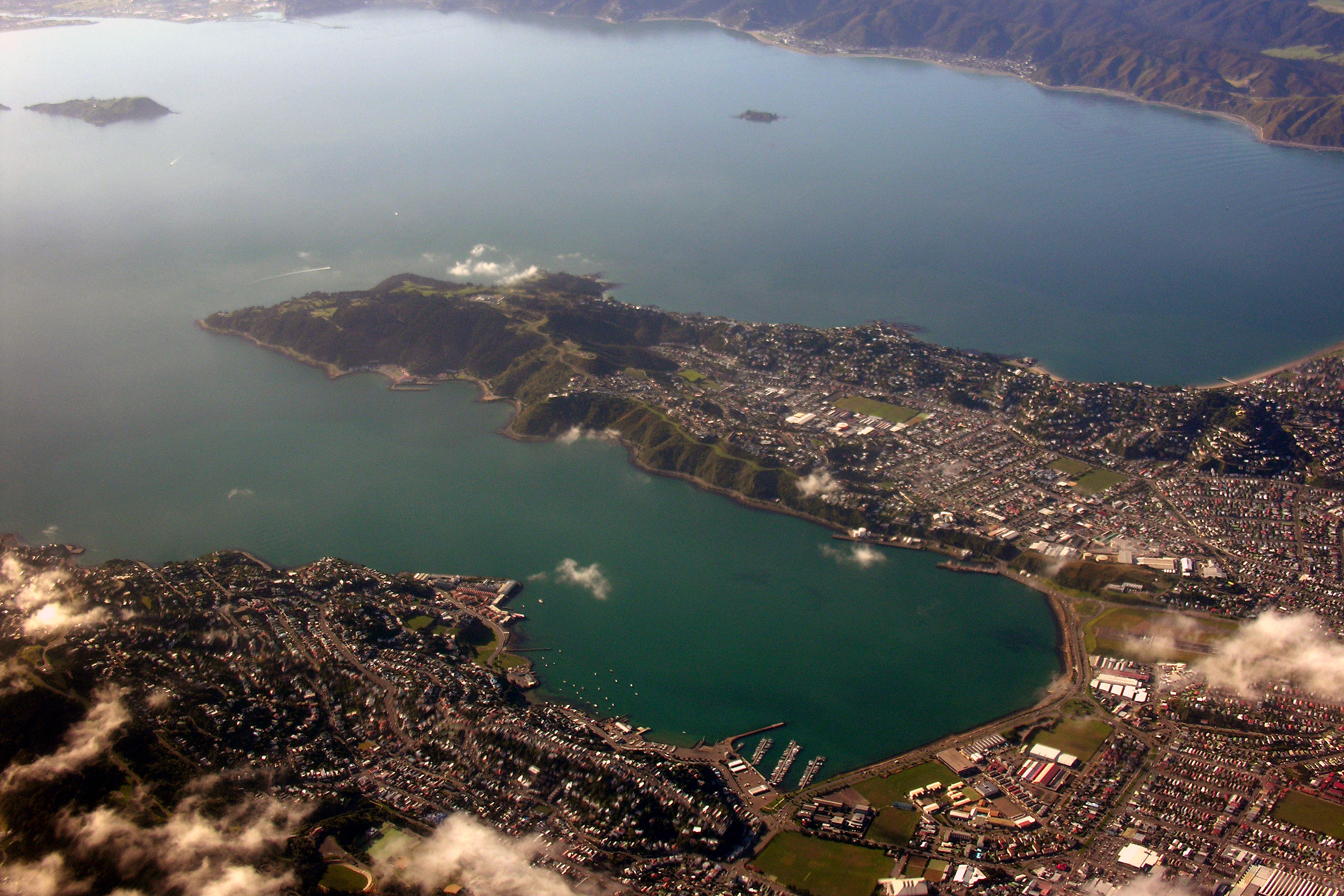
- Aerial view of Evans Bay, showing marina at bottom centre, Miramar peninsula in the centre and the eastern side of Wellington Harbour in the distance.
- Interactive map of Evans Bay
- Location: Wellington
- Coordinates: 41°18′40″S 174°48′20″E
- Type: Bay
- Etymology: Named for George Samuel Evans. Ākau Tangi translates as "the crying shore".
- Part of: Wellington Harbour
- Max. length: 3.6 kilometres (2.2 mi)
- Max. width: 1.4 kilometres (0.87 mi)
- Sections/sub-basins: Little Karaka Bay, Balaena Bay, Weka Bay, Kio Bay, Shark Bay, Shelley Bay
- Benches: Balaena Bay, Hataitai Beach

Evans Bay (Māori: Ākau Tangi) is a large bay at the southern end of Wellington Harbour, New Zealand. Located between the Miramar Peninsula and Hataitai, it was the site of New Zealand's first patent slip and served as Wellington's international flying-boat terminal from 1938 until 1956. It is named after George Samuel Evans, an early Wellington settler.

== Geography ==
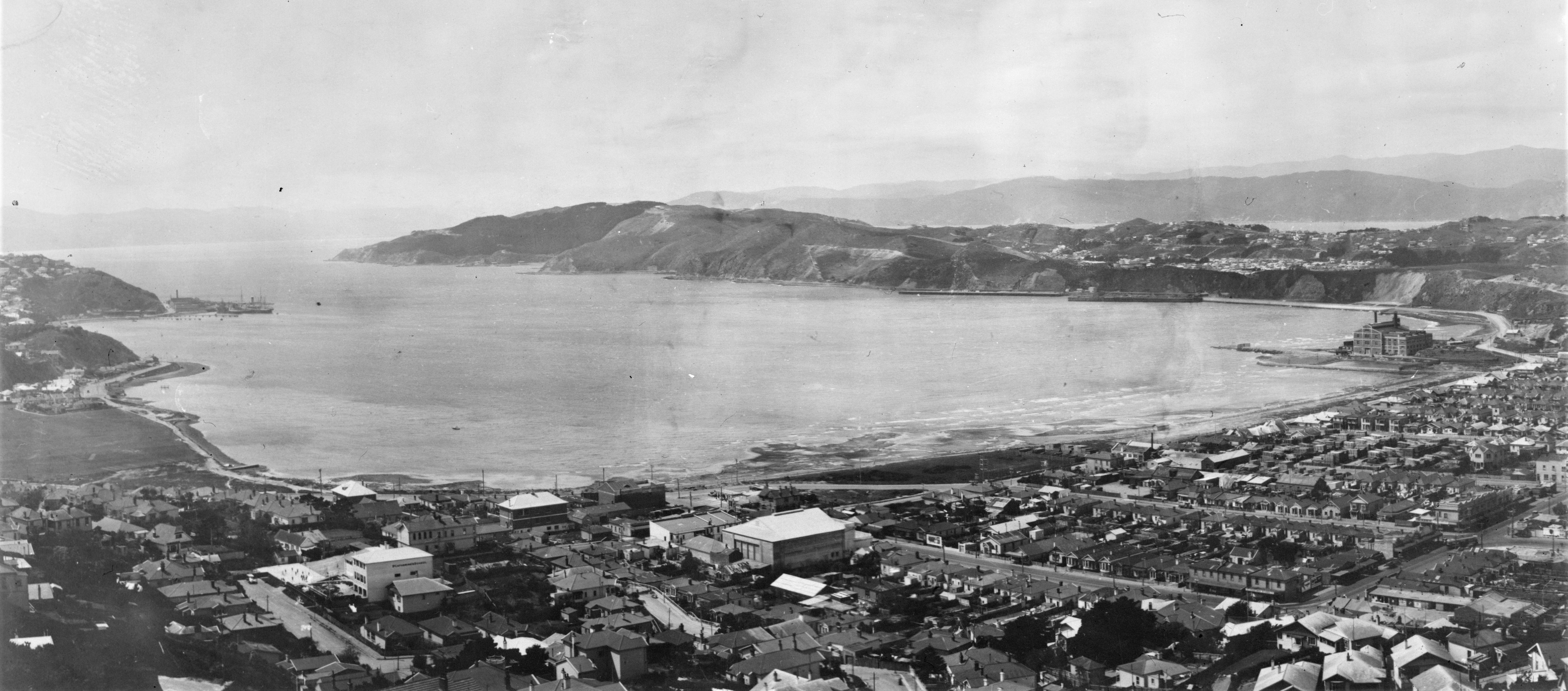
Evans Bay from above Kilbirnie, 1925, showing the patent slip and the power station. Mudflats at the head of the bay have since been reclaimed.

Evans Bay is a large U-shaped bay within Wellington Harbour. Within the bay are smaller features such as Balaena Bay, Hataitai Beach and Shelly Bay. Prior to the Haowhenua earthquake in about 1460 AD, Miramar was an island and Evans Bay would have been open to Lyall Bay. Today it is bounded by the Miramar peninsula to the east, the Rongotai isthmus to the south, and a hilly ridge forming part of Hataitai to the west. Formerly the Waipapa Stream flowed from the valley in Hataitai into the head of Evans Bay near the bluff at Wellington Road, creating a large swampy delta. The shoreline of the bay in this area was known by Māori as Te Akau-tangi ("the crying shore", or "the murmuring shore"). An 1890 map names the beach at the head of the bay as Tangahakau Beach. Another Māori name suggested for Evans Bay is Kokotahi te Taniwha.

Considerable reclamation has been undertaken at the southern end of the bay. Kilbirnie Park and Cobham Drive sit on reclaimed land.

Evans Bay as an unofficial Wellington suburb nestles at the western side of the bay between Hataitai, Kilbirnie and Rongotai. According to the 2018 census, the population of Evans Bay was 1122 people living in 435 dwellings. Evans Bay Intermediate School is to the south at the head of the bay.

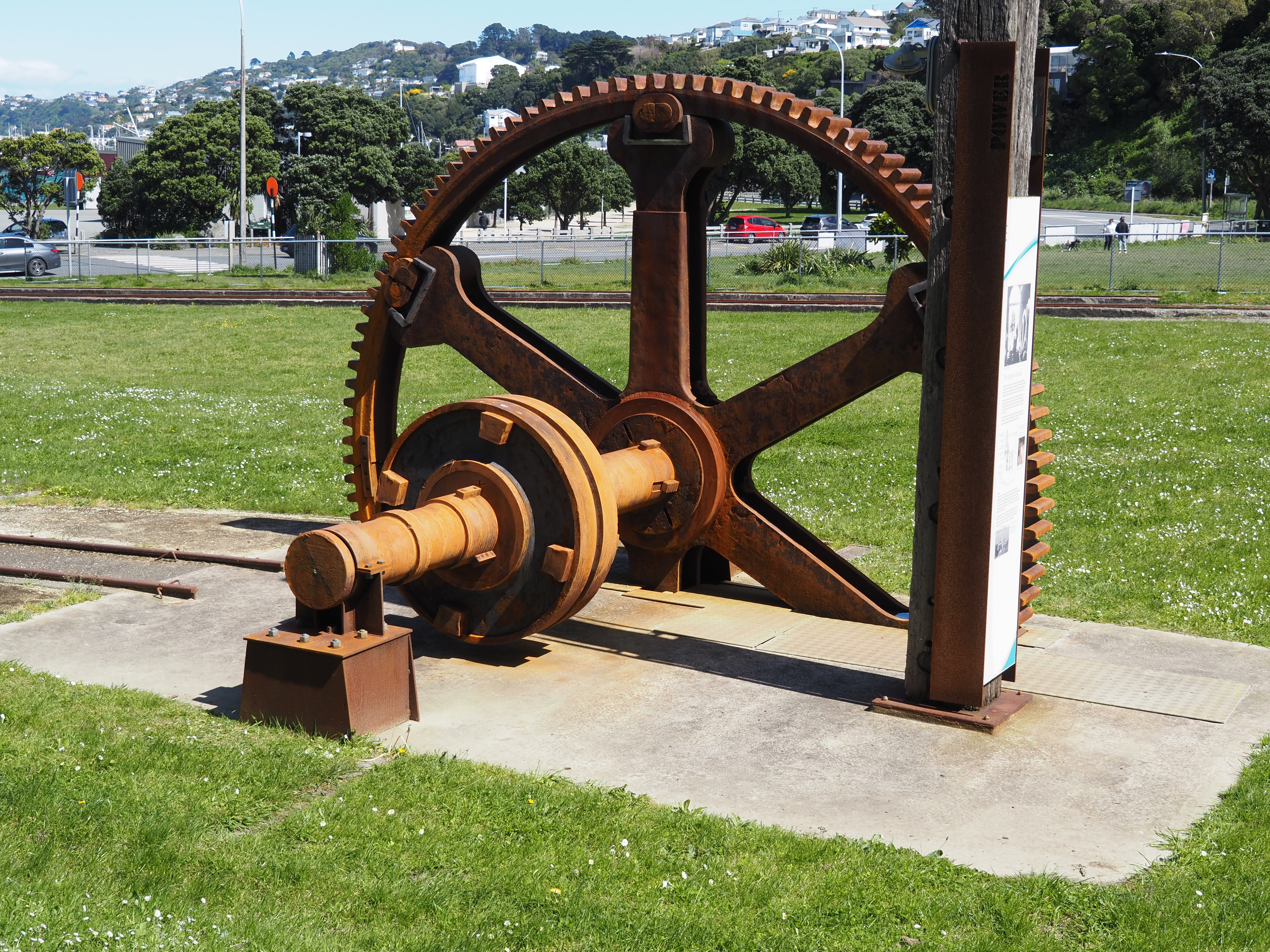
Evans Bay Patent Slip heritage site in 2022

== History ==
=== Patent slip ===
A heritage site near Greta Point commemorates the former Patent slip that operated in this location. The first slipway on the site was commissioned in May 1863 to enable maintenance of the hulls of small vessels. The Wellington Provincial Council was keen to encourage shipping trade by improving facilities in Wellington harbour, and began planning later in 1863 for the construction of a larger patent slip. A concession was granted for the supply, construction and operation of a patent slip on the site. Equipment for the new slip was delivered in 1865 and 1866, but construction was delayed for several years because of a contractual dispute concerning the suitability of the design for the ground conditions. The original suppliers lost a court case and withdrew from the project. The Wellington Patent Slip Company was formed to take over the assets and construction began in 1871. In March 1873, the Patent Slip was officially opened.

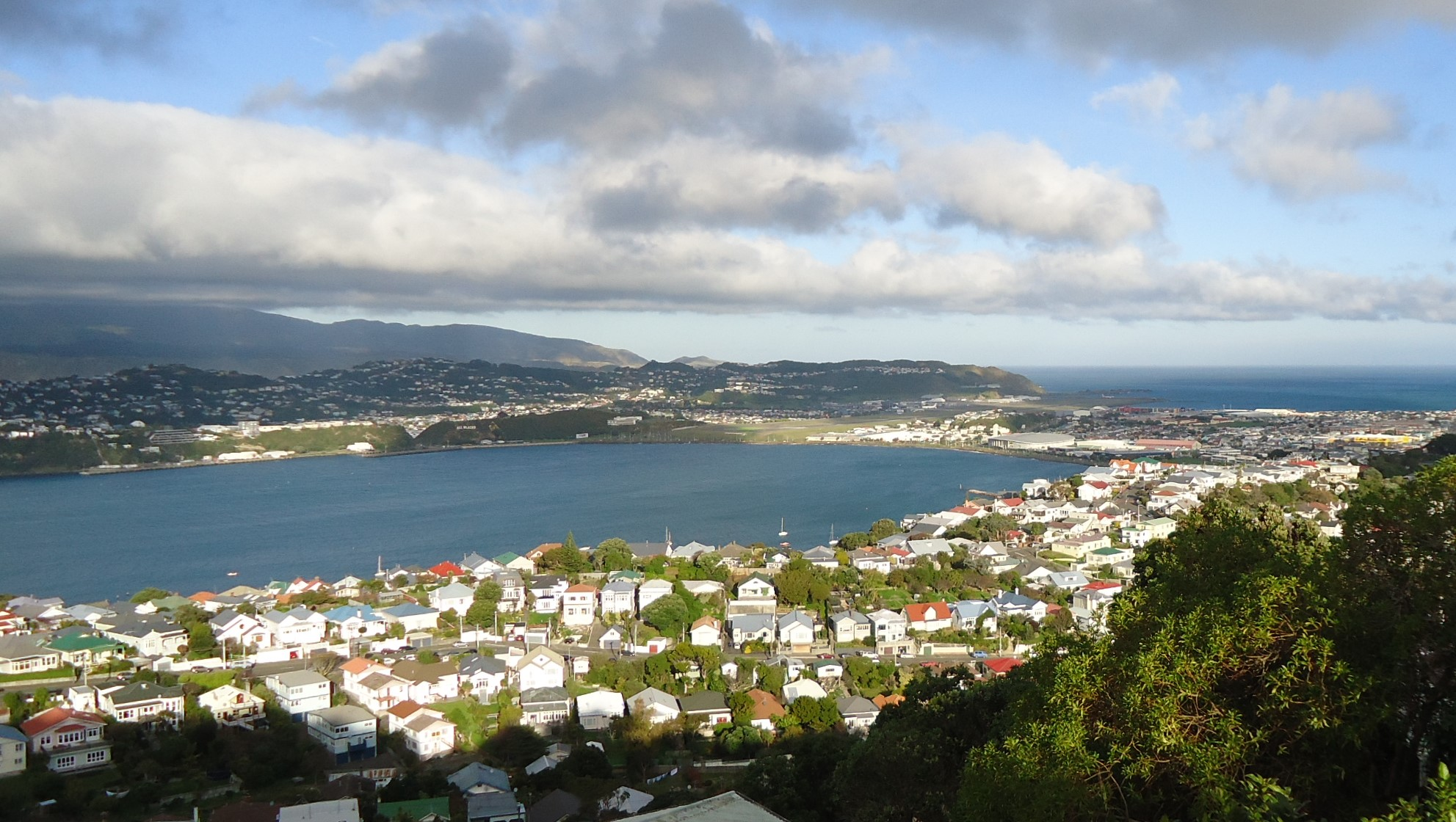
View of Evans Bay from Mt Victoria, looking towards Miramar and Rongotai, with Lyall Bay and Cook Strait in the distance. Around the bay from left: wharves, V of Miramar Cutting, Airport, Rongotai.

A second slipway was constructed at the site in 1922. The original slip operated until 1969, and the second was closed on 31 July 1980. Most equipment has been removed from the site, and a residential development now occupies some of the original land. However, the site has been listed as a Category 2 Historic Place, and the area is classified as a heritage zone by the Wellington City Council.

=== Union Steam Ship Company, Greta Point ===
During 1910 – 1911 the Union Steam Ship Company reclaimed land at Greta Point next to the Patent Slip and constructed a large complex of buildings, including a laundry, workshops, a sawmill and upholstery department. All of the company's laundry in New Zealand was handled by the site at Evans Bay. By 1981 all but one building had been demolished, and the former store became a bar and restaurant known as the Greta Point Tavern. In 2003 it was moved in pieces in 11 trips by barge to a site on Queens Wharf in the inner city. Not much remains of the original building except the exterior. As of 2022 the relocated building houses Foxglove bar and restaurant. The land at Greta Point was then used for a 91-unit townhouse development designed by Stuart Gardyne and Allan Wright of architecture+ and built during 2001–2002.

=== Power station ===
In the early 1920s a coal-fired power station was built at Shag Point in Evans Bay (approximately near the roundabout at the intersection of Calabar Road and Cobham Drive). It began full operation in May 1924 and was shut down in 1968. Coke breeze ( a coal by-product) from the power station was used as infill for reclamation at the Evans Bay Yacht Club site. While the power station was unpopular due to its unsightliness and emissions, its outlet pipes discharged warm water into Evans Bay, which was enjoyed by bathers.

=== Flying boats ===
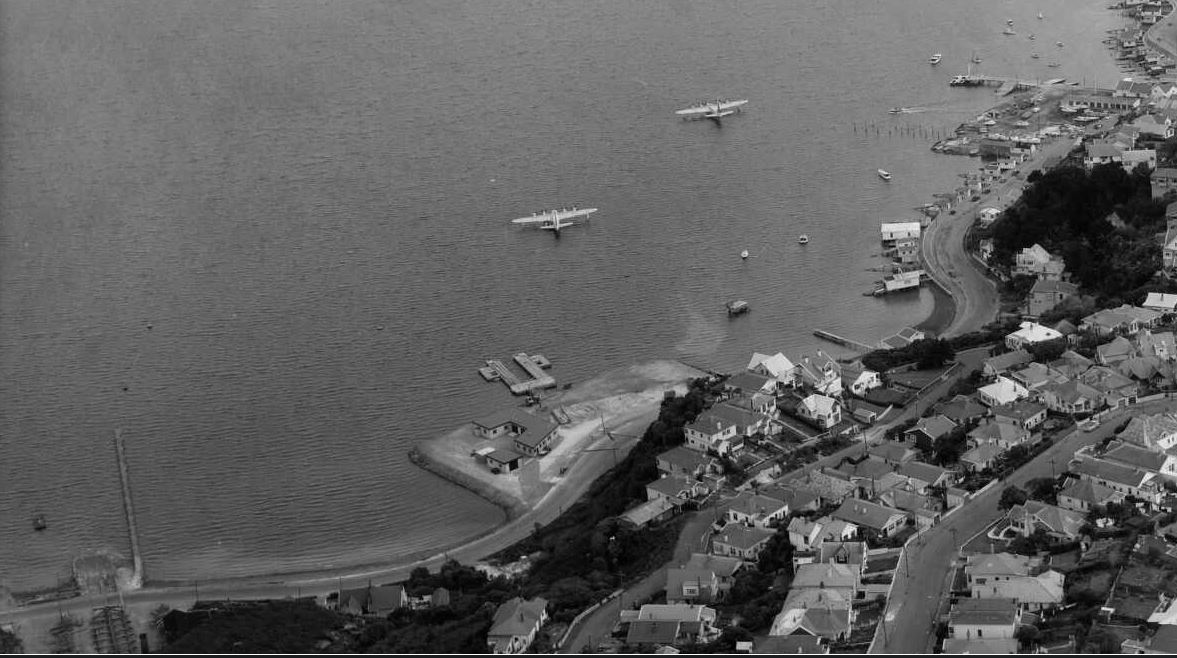
The flying boat base with Braby pontoon, 1951. Patent slip at bottom left and marina at top right.

Evans Bay functioned as the preferred flying-boat alighting area in Wellington Harbour during the 1930s, and local officials promoted it through the decade as such. However a 1938 report concluded that although Evans Bay was the best site for flying boats in Wellington Harbour, it was subject to strong winds that would make a regular service unviable. Visits from Imperial Airways aircraft took place in 1938 as well as from Pan American types. In 1940 Tasman Empire Airways Limited (TEAL) flew one of their two Short Empire flying boats to Evans Bay with dignitaries who attended the nearby New Zealand Centennial Exhibition located at Rongotai.

Although RNZAF Short Sunderland and Consolidated Catalina flying-boat operations flew intermittently through the 1940s from their seaplane base at Shelly Bay located on the western side of the Miramar Peninsula, it was not until October 1950 that TEAL (the forerunner to the national airline Air New Zealand), operated a permanent overseas service to Australia from Evans Bay. A temporary terminal was provided by using roadside parking-garages along Evans Bay Parade at the sheltered western end of the bay next to the patent slip, until a more substantial terminal facility was constructed for TEAL on reclaimed land at what is now Cog Park in 1951. At first passengers were transported by launch between the shore and the flying boats, but in 1951 a small jetty was built and connected via a gangway to a floating pontoon made of 124 large square steel tanks connected together and ballasted with water and oil. The pontoon was built at Gracefield from ship tanks used by US forces during World War 2 to build rafts and wharves. The tanks were welded together in three sections, which were then slid down a bank into the Hutt River and towed across the harbour to Evans Bay. The pontoon was U-shaped, 110 ft long and 74 ft wide. Flying boats were winched tail-first into the U so that passengers could step straight onto the pontoon dock. The dock also allowed light maintenance of the Short Solent flying boats that TEAL used at the time. Evans Bay could become quite rough in unfavourable weather conditions and at least one Solent was damaged during alighting, needing substantial repairs. The trans-Tasman flying boat service ended in 1954, and in 1957 the 400-ton pontoon structure, known as a 'Braby pontoon', was winched on to land, dismantled and transported in pieces to Auckland by road and rail, to be reused by the Air Force's flying boats at Hobsonville Air Base.

Services to the Chatham Islands also operated from Evans Bay, using aircraft from TEAL and Ansett Airways as well as the RNZAF. A proposal for a peak-time domestic service to Auckland by National Airways Corporation in 1949 using Short Sandringham flying boats to make up for the 1947 closure of Rongotai Airport was turned down as uneconomic compared to DC-3 operations 56 kilometres (35 mi) away at the present-day Kapiti Coast airport.

Nearby Rongotai airfield provided air-traffic control for the alighting area. As advances in aviation overtook the flying-boat concept, TEAL switched to landplane operations and the Evans Bay terminal closed in 1956. Also at the time, Rongotai airfield started undergoing total redevelopment into today's Wellington International Airport, which opened in 1959. An original concept involved developing a joint landbase and flying-boat airport, but this did not come to fruition.

The terminal building built for TEAL airways was later used by Sea Cadets. The building was badly damaged by fire on 15 December 2005 and had to be demolished. The Sea Cadet unit moved into another building on the site that had been a TEAL workshop, then into a new purpose-built building opened in 2007.

=== Whale sighting ===
Orca and dolphins visit Wellington Harbour fairly often, but whale sightings are much rarer. In July 2018 a juvenile male southern right whale was seen in Evans Bay. Crowds of people came to see the whale during the week it was in the bay, causing traffic jams. Wellington City Council postponed its annual Matariki public fireworks display after taking advice about the whale from the Department of Conservation. The mid-winter timing of the whale's visit led some people to nickname it 'Matariki'.

== Demographics ==
Evans Bay statistical area runs between Hataitai and the bay. It covers 0.35 km^{2} (0.14 sq mi) and had an estimated population of 1,140 as of June 2025, with a population density of 3,257 people per km^{2}.

Historical population
Year	Pop.	±% p.a.
2006	930	—
2013	1,038	+1.58%
2018	1,122	+1.57%
2023	1,128	+0.11%

Evans Bay had a population of 1,128 in the 2023 New Zealand census, an increase of 6 people (0.5%) since the 2018 census, and an increase of 90 people (8.7%) since the 2013 census. There were 558 males, 552 females, and 21 people of other genders in 450 dwellings. 8.8% of people identified as LGBTIQ+. The median age was 35.3 years (compared with 38.1 years nationally). There were 126 people (11.2%) aged under 15 years, 336 (29.8%) aged 15 to 29, 534 (47.3%) aged 30 to 64, and 132 (11.7%) aged 65 or older.

People could identify as more than one ethnicity. The results were 79.5% European (Pākehā); 12.2% Māori; 5.6% Pasifika; 12.8% Asian; 3.2% Middle Eastern, Latin American and African New Zealanders (MELAA); and 1.9% other, which includes people giving their ethnicity as "New Zealander". English was spoken by 98.1%, Māori by 4.3%, Samoan by 0.5%, and other languages by 21.5%. No language could be spoken by 1.3% (e.g. too young to talk). New Zealand Sign Language was known by 0.5%. The percentage of people born overseas was 32.7, compared with 28.8% nationally.

Religious affiliations were 20.7% Christian, 1.9% Hindu, 0.5% Islam, 0.8% Māori religious beliefs, 1.3% Buddhist, 0.8% New Age, and 1.9% other religions. People who answered that they had no religion were 66.8%, and 5.1% of people did not answer the census question.

Of those at least 15 years old, 570 (56.9%) people had a bachelor's or higher degree, 333 (33.2%) had a post-high school certificate or diploma, and 96 (9.6%) people exclusively held high school qualifications. The median income was $62,700, compared with $41,500 nationally. 291 people (29.0%) earned over $100,000 compared to 12.1% nationally. The employment status of those at least 15 was 645 (64.4%) full-time, 120 (12.0%) part-time, and 30 (3.0%) unemployed.

== Amenities and points of interest ==
=== Meridian Wind Sculpture Walk ===
The Wind Sculpture Walk consists of five wind-activated sculptures installed along Cobham Drive at the head of Evans Bay between 2001 and 2010. The sculptures and walkway were the result of a partnership between the Wellington Sculpture Trust, Wellington City Council and Meridian Energy. The area gets a lot of wind and the kinetic sculptures celebrate this. The five sculptures are Zephyrometer, Urban Forest, Akau Tangi, Tower of Light, and Pacific Grass.

=== Evans Bay Marina ===
Evans Bay Marina is situated at the southern end of Evans Bay. It has four piers with walk-on access to 141 berths for boats between 6 and 20m long. The marina is managed by Wellington City Council. Wellington Volunteer Coastguard operates from a base at the marina.

=== Evans Bay Yacht and Motor Boat Club ===
Evans Bay Yacht and Motor Boat Club has premises next to the marina on the western side of the bay, including a hall that can be hired by the public. The club was founded in 1919.

=== Cog Park ===
Cog Park is a grassy park situated between the patent slip site and the Evans Bay Yacht Club. The park is in two parts, separated by Evans Bay Parade. The seaward side of the park is on land that was reclaimed in two stages, firstly for the flying boat base in 1951 and then for port purposes in 1967. Buildings on the site associated with the flying boat base were demolished in the early 2000s. The park gets its name from a large cog wheel that was once part of the patent slip winding gear. The cog wheel used to sit on the grass on the seaward side but was later installed across the road at the patent slip heritage site. The park is used by joggers and walkers and includes a fenced dog exercise area on the landward side.

=== Balaena Bay and Hataitai Beach ===
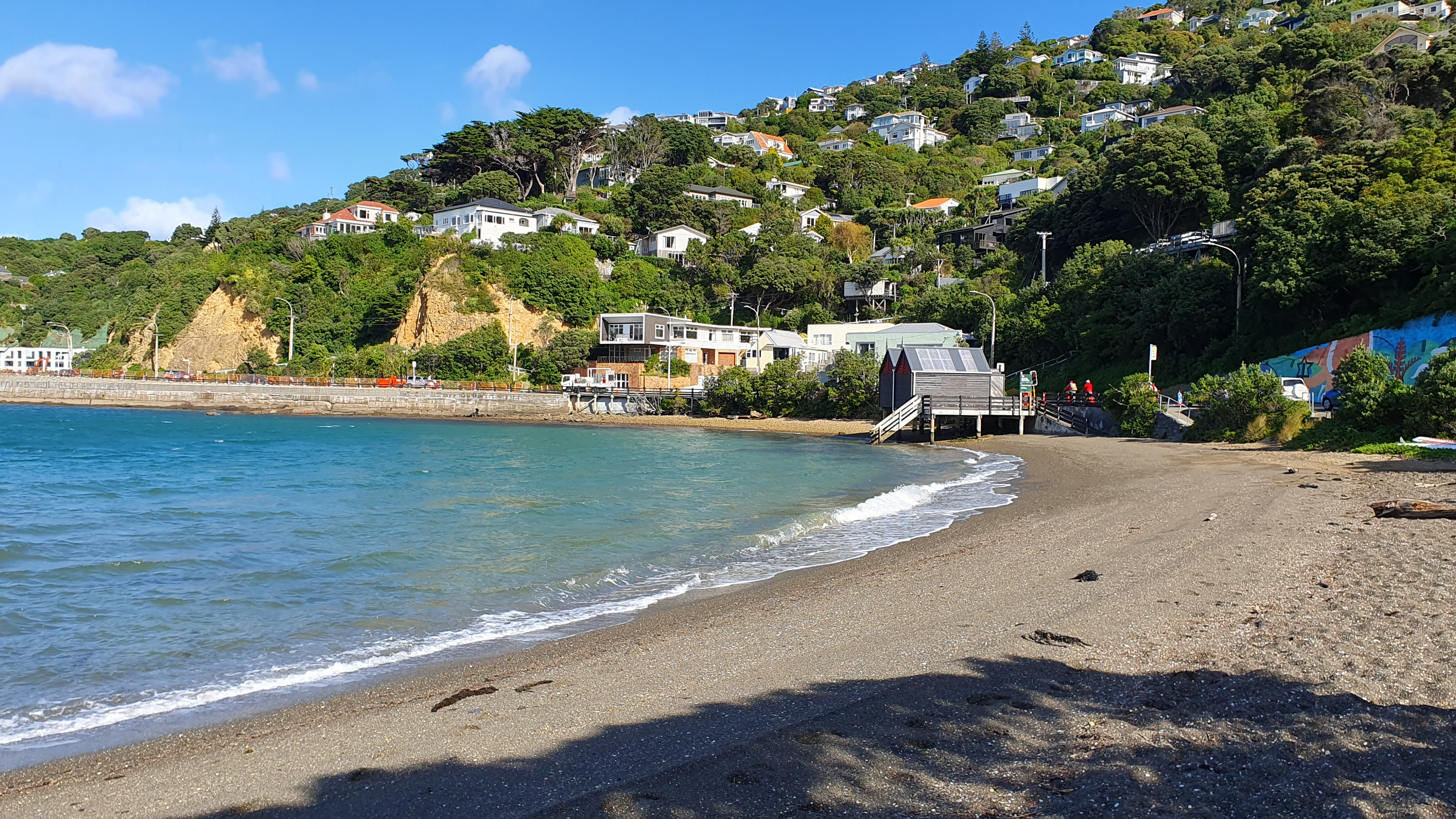
The beach at Balaena Bay, on the western shore of Evans Bay

Balaena Bay and Hataitai Beach, two small sheltered bays on the western side of Evans Bay, have been popular sunbathing and swimming locations for many years. Both areas have changing rooms and toilets, and Balaena Bay has a carpark. The Hataitai Bathing Club (now known as the Hataitai Amateur Swimming Club) was formed in 1908 and for many years ran swimming lessons and competitions from Hataitai Beach. The club built a private clubhouse in 1912, which was opened to the public around 1967 and then demolished in the 1970s, after which Wellington City Council built the current facilities. The club still offers children's swimming lessons, which now take place at the Aquadome at Wellington East Girls' College.

In 2025, Wellington City Council completed construction of a $1.5 million, 115-metre-long seawall and cycleway along Evans Bay Road at Hataitai Beach. Local people asserted that the seawall encroaches onto the beach and that beachfront had been lost, especially at high tide, changing the character of the beach. Greater Wellington City Council stated that it would investigate, and the City Council said that it might top up the beach with more sand.

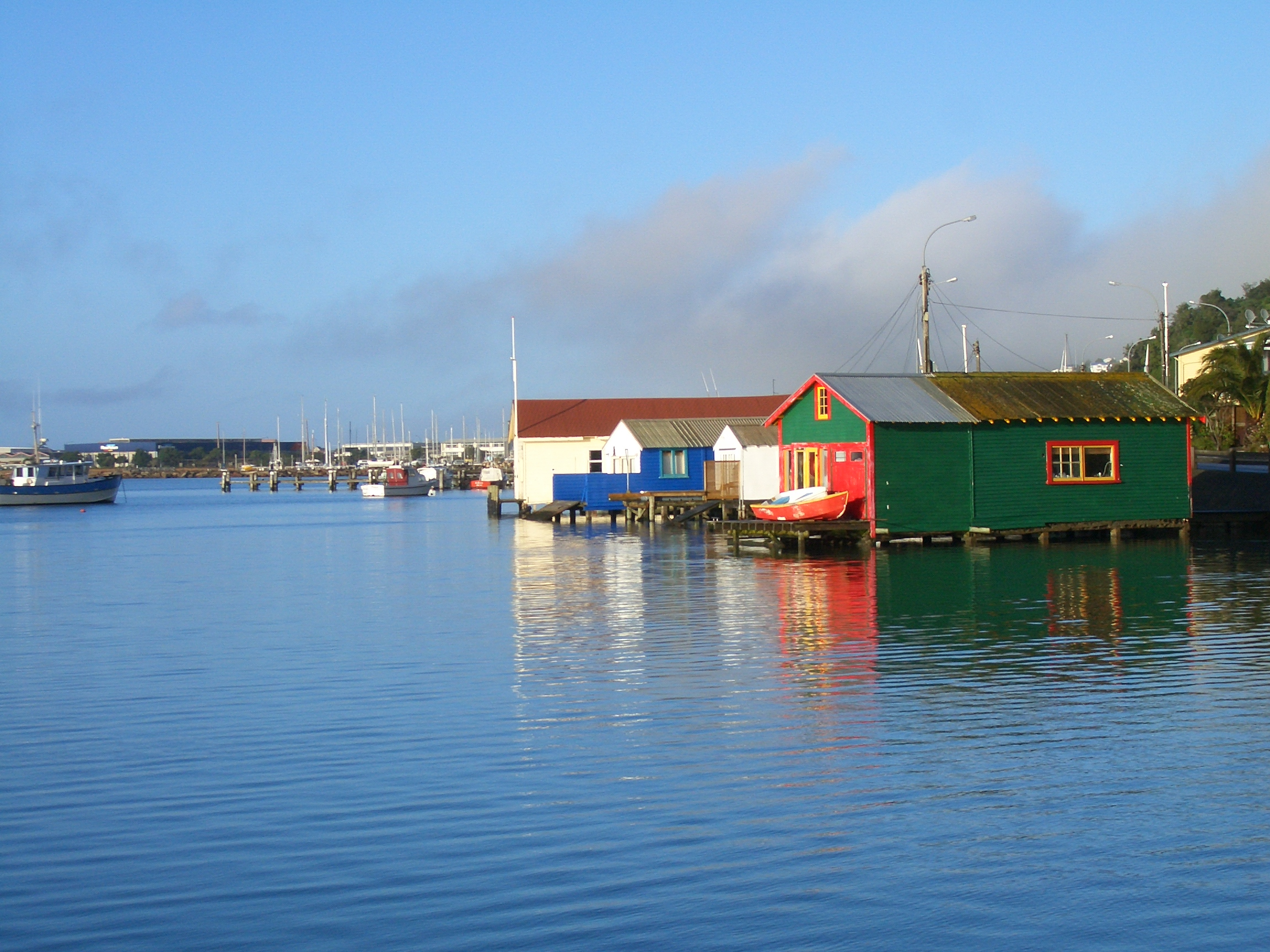
Boatsheds and the marina at Evans Bay

=== Boat sheds ===
Fifteen boatsheds are located on the western side of the bay between Hataitai Beach and the Evans Bay Yacht and Motor Boat club. A larger shed purpose-built for the Britannia Sea Scouts has a lean-to on each side of the main shed. The sheds sit above the water on wooden or concrete piles. They were built to store small boats and equipment, probably between the mid-1920s and the early 1930s. Another group of nine boatsheds were demolished to make way for the Evans Bay Marina around the 1950s. The boatsheds are privately owned, with tenure through a coastal permit for a licence to occupy issued by the Greater Wellington Regional Council.

=== Miramar Wharf and Burnham Wharf ===
Miramar Wharf and Burnham Wharf are situated on the Miramar peninsula at the eastern head of Evans Bay. Miramar Wharf was funded by the Crawford family and built in 1901. In 1909–1910 the wharf was altered and extended and at the same time a concrete seawall was built to the south and land reclaimed behind it. Tram tracks were laid from the wharf through the newly created Miramar Cutting to the Miramar Gas Works so that coal could be unloaded more efficiently. The wharf was further lengthened in 1921. In November 2015 the wharf, then owned by CentrePort Wellington, was closed due to deterioration of the piles. Burnham Wharf was built for the British Imperial Oil Company and opened in 1927. As of 2021 the wharf is operated by CentrePort. Aviation fuel for Wellington Airport arrives via Burnham Wharf.

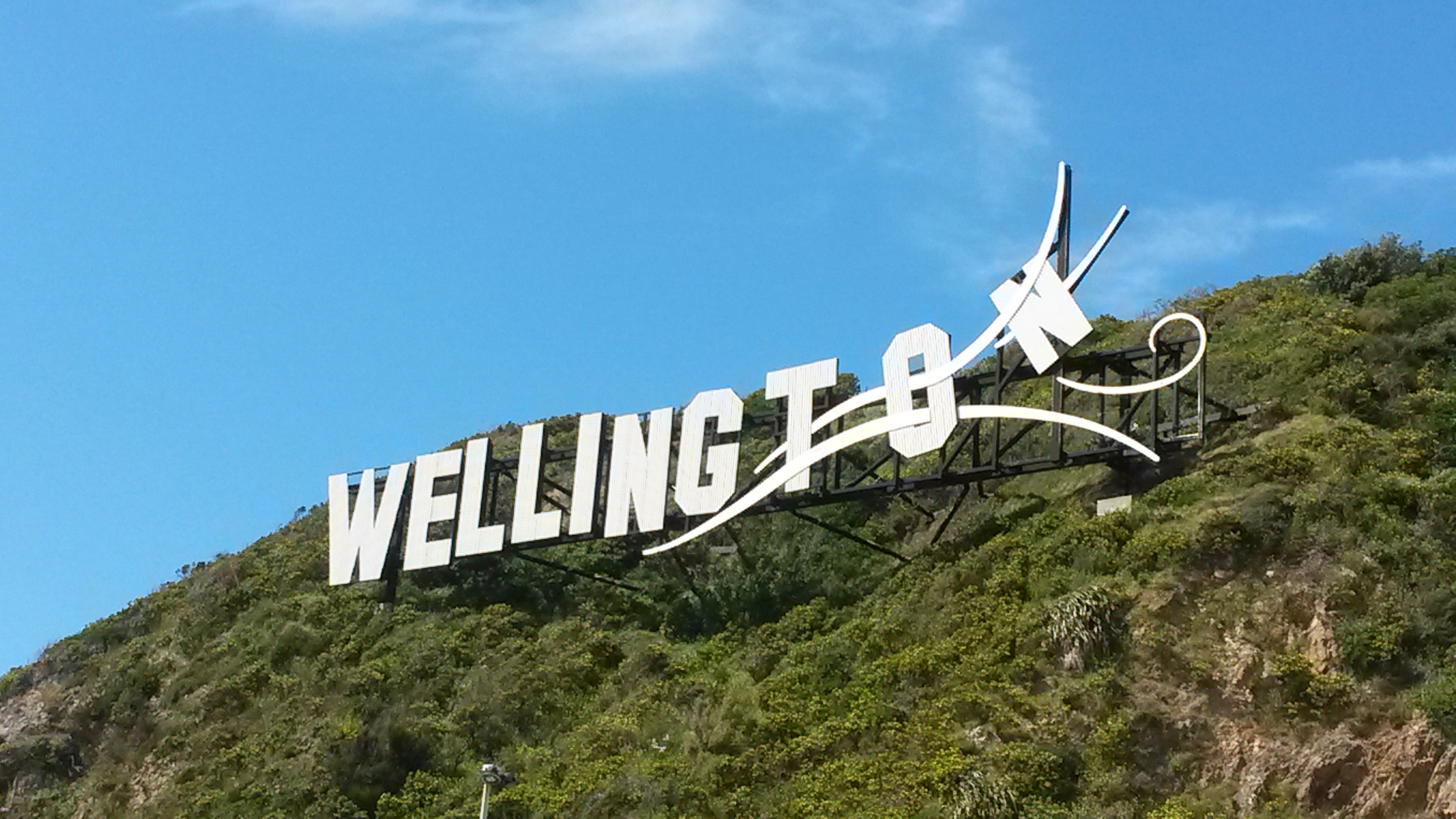
'Wellington Blown Away' sign near Wellington Airport.

=== 'Wellington Blown Away' sign ===
In 2012 Wellington Airport Company erected a large sign spelling out "WELLINGTON", with the last few letters looking like they are blowing away in the wind, on a hill between the airport and the Cutting. The original plan was to spell out WELLYWOOD, but this met with massive public opposition. The sign can be seen from Cobham Drive and across Evans Bay.

=== Shelly Bay ===
Shelly Bay is a bay on the eastern side of Evans Bay. For many years it was used by the Defence Force. It was the proposed site of a major residential development, but the project was cancelled in September 2023, and the land sold to Peter Jackson and Fran Walsh.
