= Tunnels through Mount Victoria =

Tunnels through the hill in New Zealand

Tunnels through Mount Victoria provide access for vehicle traffic, pedestrians, public transport and infrastructure serving the largely residential eastern suburbs of Wellington, New Zealand, which are separated from the city by Mount Victoria. A drainage tunnel was created in the 1890s, and the first traffic tunnel was completed in 1907. As of 2026 there are proposals for a third traffic tunnel.

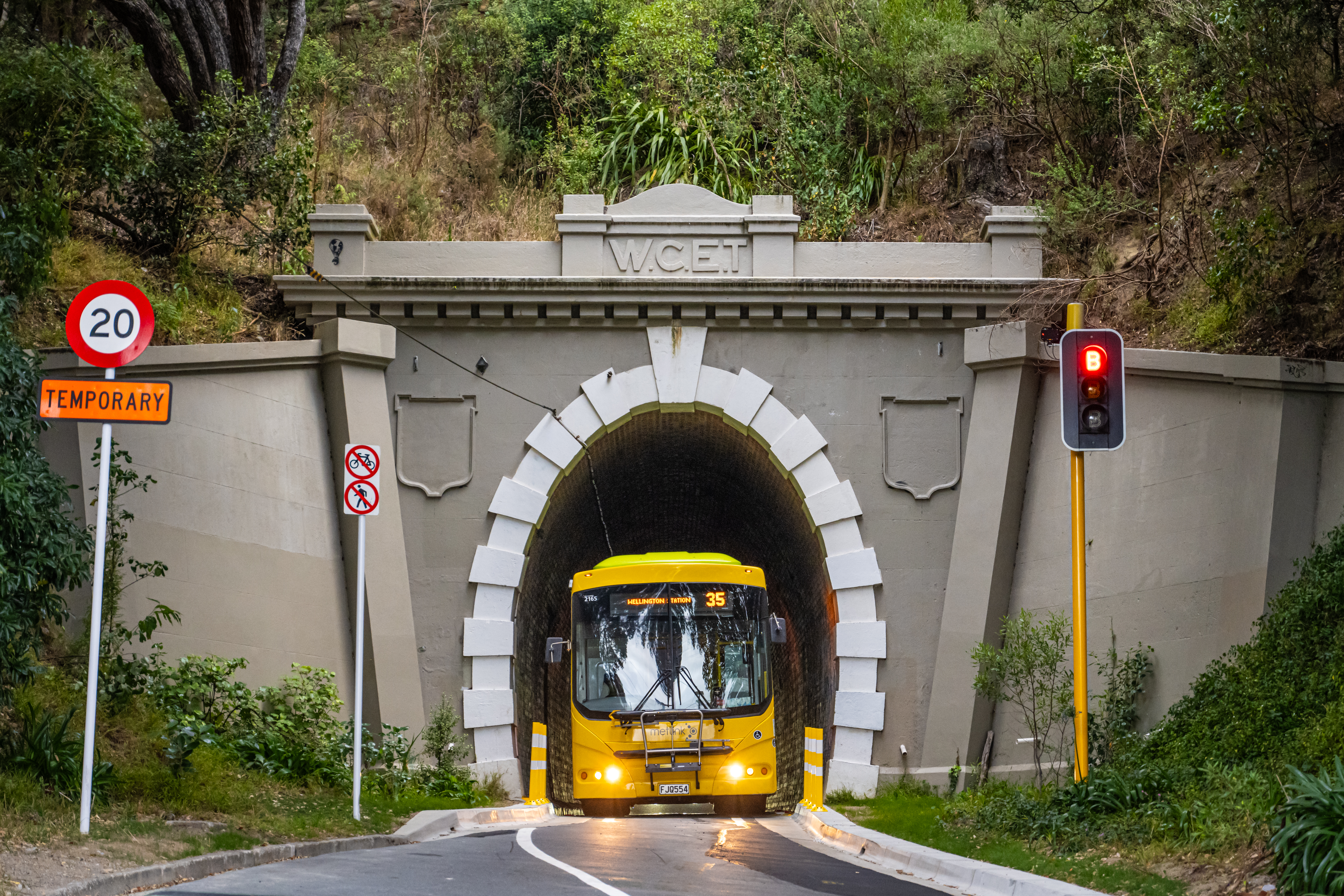
A bus exiting the city side of the Hataitai Bus Tunnel

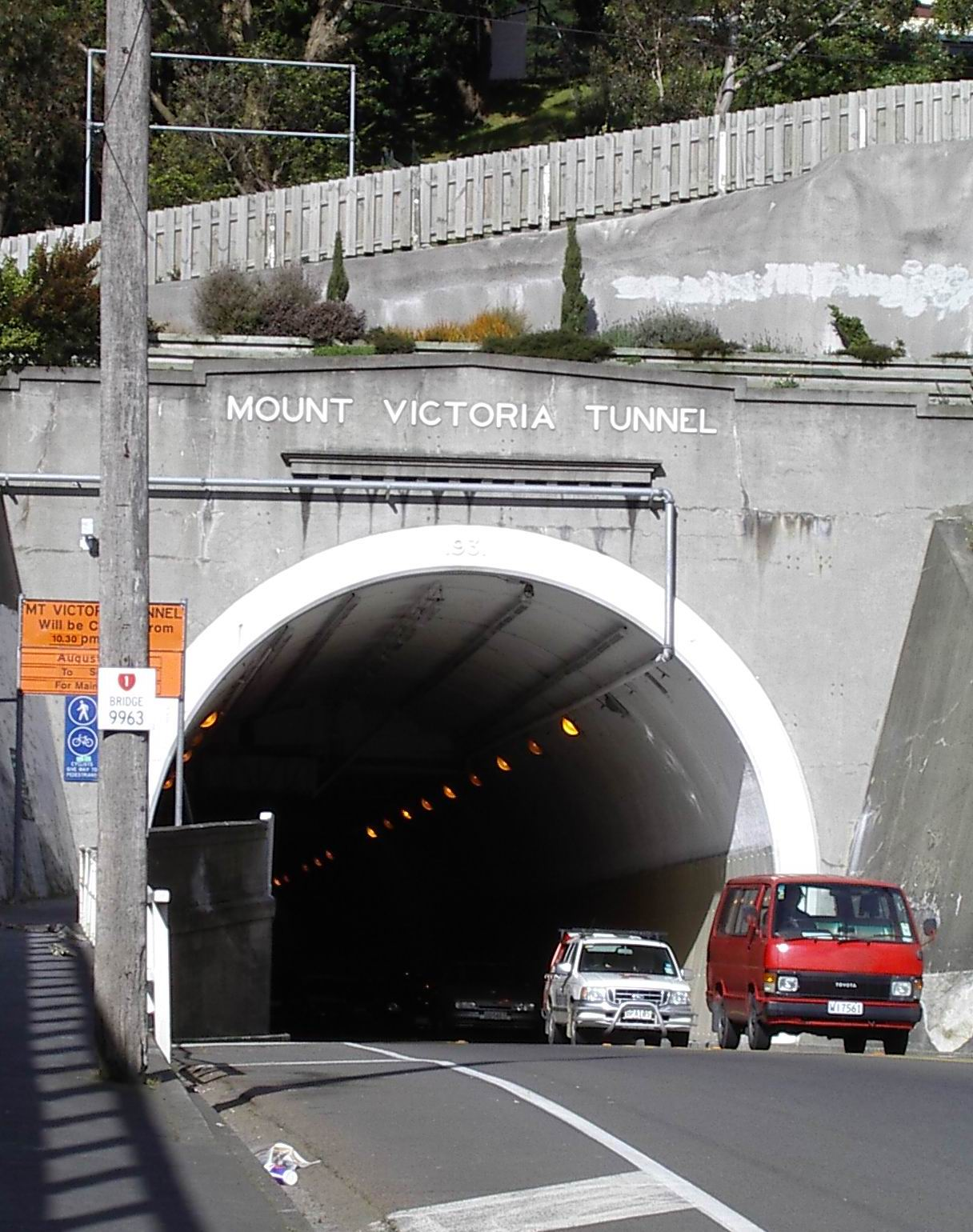
City side of the Mount Victoria Tunnel

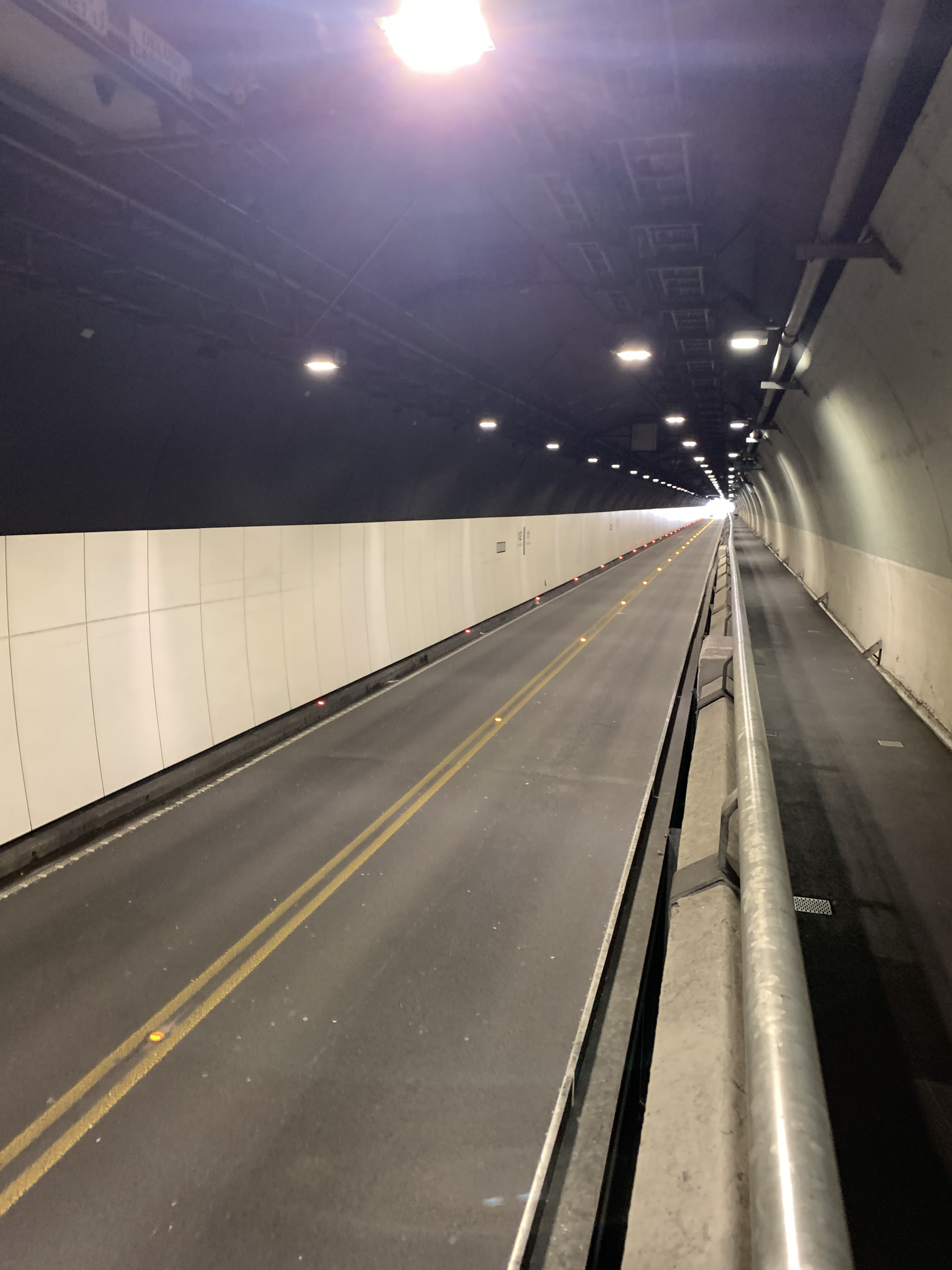
Interior of the Mount Victoria Tunnel, showing the raised pedestrian walkway

== Hataitai Bus Tunnel ==
In the 1870s and 1880s, members of the public expressed a wish for a tunnel through Mount Victoria, and as Kilbirnie developed in the late 1800s, there were more demands for a tunnel from the city. There were also proposals from this time for a rail tunnel under Mount Victoria.

The Hataitai Land Company bought land on the eastern slopes of Mount Victoria for a housing development and offered to pay part of the cost of construction of a tunnel from Elizabeth Street in Mount Victoria to what is now Hataitai, as it would improve access to their subdivision.

In 1904 the City Council's engineer recommended a tram tunnel be put through Mount Victoria to Hataitai on the basis that Hataitai residents would contribute to the cost. This would enable a tram service to run as far as Kilbirnie. The plan included laying an 8 inch water supply main from the city to Kilbirnie through the tram tunnel. The tram tunnel opened in April 1907. Spoil from the tunnel was used to create a flat play area on the Mount Victoria side and to reclaim land at Evans Bay which now forms part of Kilbirnie Park.

The tunnel is one lane wide and oval in cross section. There is no pedestrian access through the tunnel: although The Hataitai Land Company and residents wanted a walkway through the tunnel, Wellington City Council wanted to collect revenue from tram fares and prosecuted anybody caught walking through the tunnel.

With the closure of Wellington's tram system in the 1960s, the tunnel was converted for trolley bus use in 1963.

== Mount Victoria Tunnel ==
With rapid development in the eastern suburbs from the early 20th century, there were calls for a second tunnel, preferably with pedestrian and vehicular access. In 1910 the City Engineer W H Morton recommended that a tunnel should be driven from near the Basin Reserve to opposite Goa Street, Hataitai, but this did not eventuate. Further schemes and discussions were proposed during the next 20 years.

In 1931, the Mount Victoria Tunnel was opened south of the then tram tunnel. The western approach is from the Basin Reserve, and in the east it ends at Hataitai. The tunnel has one lane in each direction and an elevated pedestrian walkway that is also used by cyclists.

== Proposed second traffic tunnel ==
In 1974 a pilot tunnel was bored through Mount Victoria as preliminary work for a planned second vehicle tunnel to be funded by the National Roads Board. The pilot tunnel is about 2.4 m (8 ft) in diameter and lies almost parallel to and north of the Mount Victoria tunnel. The second tunnel project was cancelled.

As of 2026, a new tunnel through Mount Victoria is in the planning stages.

== The interceptor ==
Wellington's first city-wide sewage system was built during the 1890s under the supervision of city drainage engineer Richard Liron Mestayer, becoming operational in 1899. The largest pipe in the system was called the interceptor. A 1.5 km-long tunnel section of the interceptor, about 2.1 metres high and 1.2 metres wide, passes through a ridge of Mount Victoria from near Hospital Road in Newtown to Duncan Terrace in Kilbirnie. Beyond Duncan Terrace the interceptor is carried in twin sewer pipes to Moa Point. A tower-like brick structure on Alexandra Road is a ventilation shaft for the interceptor. It is not directly above the tunnel, due to the necessity of finding good foundations. Another ventilation tower was built near Duncan Terrace.
