= Stephen King (disambiguation) =

Stephen King (born 1947) is an American author.

Stephen King, Steven King or Steve King may also refer to:

== Entertainment ==
- Steve King (audio engineer) (1958–2014), American record producer and audio engineer
- Steve King (radio) (born 1940), American radio personality
- Stephen James King (born 1983), Australian TV and stage actor

== Politics ==
- Stephen King (conservationist), New Zealand conservationist
- Steve King (Colorado legislator) (born 1965), Colorado state senator
- Steve King (born 1949), Former U.S. Representative from Iowa
- Steve King (ambassador) (born 1941), Wisconsin businessman and the US Ambassador to the Czech Republic
- Steven King (journalist), former chief political adviser to the Ulster Unionist Party leader David Trimble

== Sports ==
=== Football ===
- Steve King (American football) (born 1951), American football player
- Stephen King (Gaelic footballer), former Gaelic football player for Cavan
- Steven King (footballer) (born 1978), Australian football player
- Stephen King (soccer) (born 1986), American Major League Soccer player

=== Ice hockey ===
- Steve King (ice hockey) (born 1948), Canadian ice hockey player
- Steven King (ice hockey) (born 1969), American ice hockey player

=== Other sports ===
- Steve King (canoeist) (born 1952), Canadian sprint canoeist
- Steven King (jockey) (born 1968–9), Australian jockey
- Steve King (baseball) (1844–1895), American baseball player

== In other fields ==
- Stephen D. King (born 1963), British economist
- Stephen King (priest), Anglican priest
- Stephen King (surveyor) (1841–1915), Australian explorer

== Characters ==
- Stephen King (The Dark Tower), a fictionalized, yet semi-autobiographical character of the author's creation

== See also ==
- King Stephen (disambiguation)
