= Oriental Bay Band Rotunda =

Building in Wellington, New Zealand

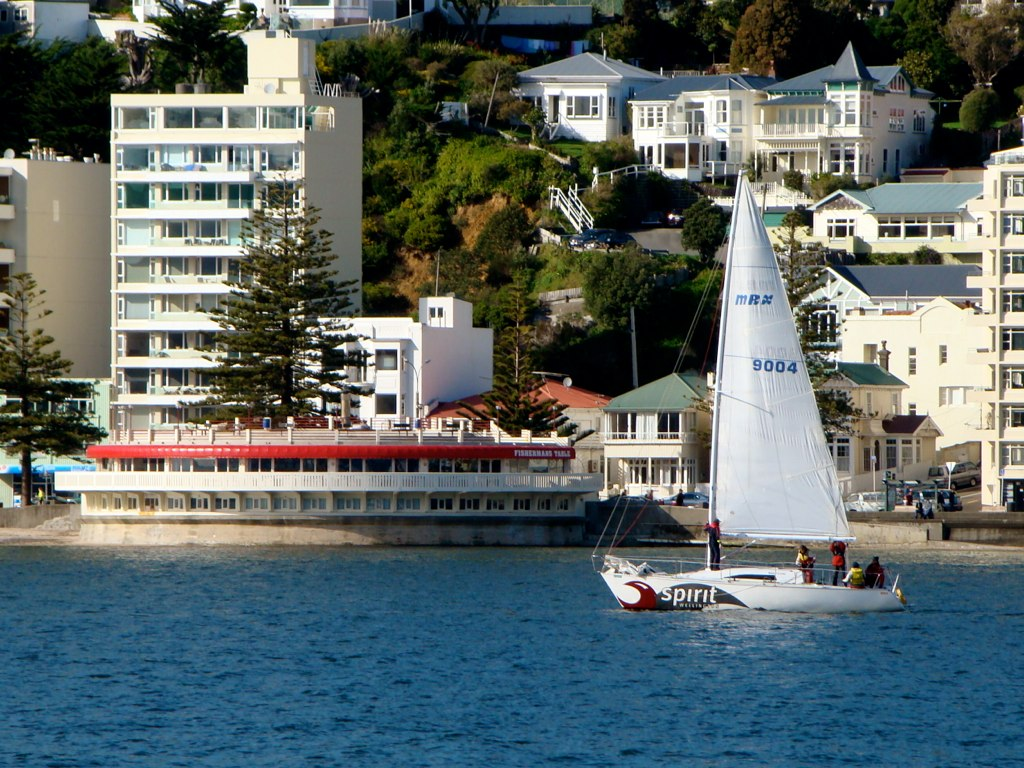
- Interactive map of the Oriental Bay Band Rotunda area

General information
- Status: Closed for redevelopment
- Type: Pavilion
- Architectural style: Moderne architecture
- Location: Wellington, 245 Oriental Parade, Oriental Bay, New Zealand
- Coordinates: 41°17′27.5″S 174°47′41″E

Heritage New Zealand – Category 2
- Designated: 25 November 1982
- Reference no.: 2894

The Oriental Bay Band Rotunda (also known as the Wellington Pavilion) is a heritage-listed building located in the middle of Oriental Bay in Wellington, New Zealand. It was built in 1936 to replace an earlier wooden band rotunda and initially was a one-storey pavilion with changing rooms for swimmers and an open-air viewing platform. Another storey was added in 1985 that became a restaurant. The basement was closed in 2012 because of earthquake risk, and the 2016 Kaikōura earthquake caused damage that led to closure of the restaurant level. Redevelopment of the building was proposed on several occasions, but in December 2024, Wellington City Council announced that it would be redeveloped as the "Wellington Pavilion", including a restaurant and bar, and retaining public access to the top level.

== History ==
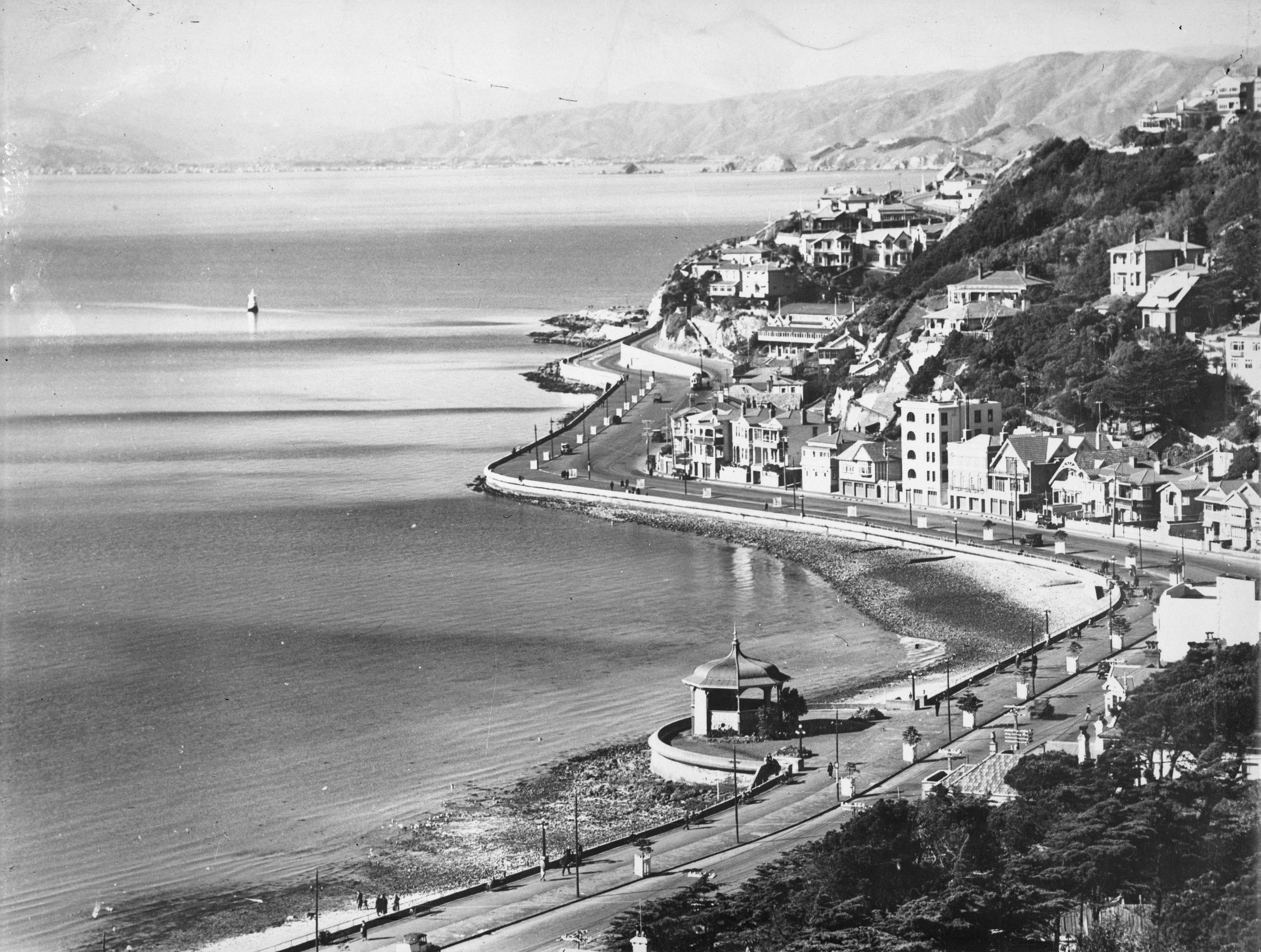
Original wooden band rotunda at Oriental Bay, 1930s.

The first band rotunda at Oriental Bay was a disused wooden rotunda shifted from Jervois Quay in 1919 and installed on a concrete platform at a rocky outcrop in the middle of the beach. As demand for changing facilities at Oriental Bay grew, Wellington City Council agreed to construct a new building on the rotunda site. In 1936 the wooden rotunda was moved again – mounted on wheels and towed by tractor through the city to Central Park in Brooklyn.

The new Moderne-style concrete building at Oriental Bay opened on 1 May 1937 as a one-storey pavilion with changing rooms for swimmers and an open-air viewing platform on top. By the late 1970s the rotunda was not used much by bathers, so Wellington City Council called for ideas to repurpose the building. In 1982, the building was listed by Heritage New Zealand as a Category 2 Historic Place. The original level was put into use for community meeting rooms and public toilets, and a new storey was built on top. This became a restaurant, opened in 1985, and a new open-air roof level open to the public was created above the restaurant.

The community rooms were closed in 2012 due to earthquake risk. In 2016 the Kaikōura earthquake caused a crack in the rotunda's foundation, which meant that the bottom floor could no longer bear the weight of the restaurant floor above it. Long exposure to the salty marine environment had also caused ‘concrete cancer’: corrosion of the metal reinforcing within the concrete structure.

A contract to redevelop the building was signed in 2019 but progress was delayed by the COVID-19 pandemic. In July 2022 the developer of the site paused construction because he had not found a tenant for the building, and in 2024 the developer and Wellington City Council terminated their agreement as no tenant had been found.

The rotunda also houses the land-based electrical components for operation of the Carter Fountain which was built in the bay in 1973.

== Redevelopment as the Wellington Pavilion ==
In December 2024 the council announced that the building would be restored and redeveloped as a restaurant and bar on the top floor, with a day spa and bathhouse beneath it. Public access to the rooftop would be retained. The redeveloped building would be known as the "Wellington Pavilion", and as of June 2025 was expected to reopen in 2027. It was originally announced that restauranteur and chef Ben Bayly would open the new restaurant, and Wellington brewery Garage Project would be the beer partner. However, Bayly was not able to reach agreement with the developers and withdrew from the project.
