= Stephen King (priest) =

Stephen King is an Anglican priest: he has been Archdeacon of Wellington since December 2015: he was previously Archdeacon for Mission and Vicar of Roseneath.

Church of England titles
Preceded by Julie Rokotakala	Archdeacon of Wellington; December 2015 – present	Succeeded by Current incumbent
