= Drive by Art =

Drive by Art is an ongoing community public art project in the city of Wellington, New Zealand. Begun in 2003 by the City Council, with local companies Flagmakers and Resene Paints, it has commissioned over 200 original art street banners which have been installed over the streets and footpaths of the CBD, Oriental Bay, and major thoroughfares. The banners are approximately 25 by 0.6 m (82.0 by 2.0 ft) and are made of vinyl. Over 250 local artists, schools, and groups have participated in Drive by Art by painting their original designs in acrylics. This community-based public art project was developed and engineered by Eric Holowacz, Wellington's Arts Programmes Manager. In 2004, Drive by Art won the Creative Places Award from Creative New Zealand, the country's government arts agency.
