= King Stephen =

King Stephen can refer to a number of individuals. Note that medieval rulers in Serbia and Bosnia used Stephen as an honorific as well as a personal name.

Kings named Stephen include:

== Rulers of Bosnia ==
- Stjepan Ostojić (r. 1418–1420)
- Stjepan Tomašević (d. 1463)

== Rulers of Croatia ==
- Stjepan Držislav (r. 969 – c. 997)
- Stjepan I of Croatia (c. 988 – 1058)
- Stjepan II of Croatia (r. 1089 – 1090 or 1091)

== Rulers of England ==
- Stephen of Blois (1092 or 1096 – 1154)

== Rulers of Hungary ==
- Stephen I of Hungary (c. 975 – 1038), Saint Stephen of Hungary
- Stephen II of Hungary (1101–1131)
- Stephen III of Hungary (1147–1172)
- Stephen IV of Hungary (1133–1165)
- Stephen V of Hungary (c. 1239 – 1272)

== Rulers of Poland ==
- Stefan Batory (died 1586), King of Poland, Prince of Transylvania

== Rulers of Serbia ==
- Stefan the First-Crowned
  - other kings of Serbia as an honorific

== Musical works ==
- Musical works with Saint Stephen of Hungary as subject:
  - King Stephen (1811), by Ludwig van Beethoven
  - István király (1885), (King Stephen), opera by Ferenc Erkel
  - István, a király (1984), rock opera

== See also ==
- Stephen King (disambiguation)
