= Mount Victoria (Wellington hill) =

Hill in Wellington, New Zealand

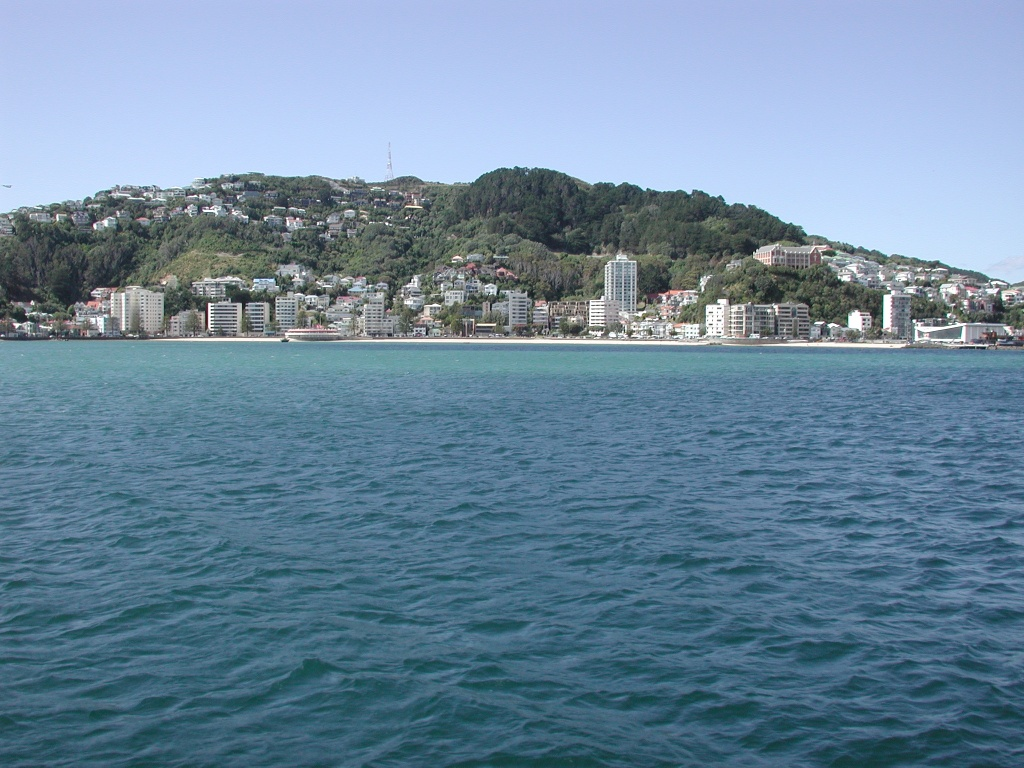
- Mount Victoria above Oriental Bay, seen from Wellington Harbour

Highest point
- Elevation: 196 m (643 ft)
- Coordinates: 41°17′46″S 174°47′39″E

Geography
- Location: North Island, New Zealand

Mount Victoria, also known as Matairangi and colloquially as Mt Vic, is a prominent 196-metre (643 ft) hill immediately to the east of central Wellington, New Zealand. Mount Victoria gives its name to the suburb of Mount Victoria on its west. The suburbs of Oriental Bay to the north, Roseneath and Hataitai to the east and Newtown to the south border Mount Victoria and climb its slopes. Mount Victoria is known for its views over Wellington and is a popular recreational area. The summit lookout is a popular visitor destination, providing 360° views of Wellington city and suburbs, Wellington Harbour, Evans Bay and the Miramar Peninsula.

== Etymology ==
Mount Victoria's original Māori name was Tangi Te Keo, though Matairangi is also used. The first name derives from a legend in which two taniwha (mythological creatures) tried to escape from Wellington Harbour which was then an enclosed lake. One taniwha became stranded and died, and its spirit turned into a bird named Te Keo, which flew to the top of the mountain and mourned (tangi). The second name translates as "to examine the sky".

== Geography and geology ==
Mount Victoria is a hill to the east of central Wellington. From the northwest (Oriental Bay) to the east (Roseneath and Hataitai) the hill's steep slopes reach down to the shoreline and separate the inner part of Wellington Harbour from Evans Bay. A road, partly built on reclaimed land, passes along the shoreline from Oriental Bay around Point Jerningham to Kilbirnie. A long, low ridge known in Māori as Te Ranga a Hiwi ("the hill ridge of Hiwi") extends southwards from the summit, with a 133-metre peak named Mount Alfred about 1 km from the summit of Mount Victoria, just above the Mount Victoria Tunnel. To the west of the ridge is the suburb of Mount Victoria and the Basin Reserve, and to the east lie Hataitai and Melrose.

There are several notable places on or adjacent to the lower flanks of the ridge from Mount Victoria to Newtown, particularly at the southern end. To the west are the grounds of Government House, Wellington Hospital, Alexandra Park, the Vice-Regal Playground, Wellington College, Wellington East Girls' College and the Gifford Observatory. To the east of the ridgeline is Hataitai Park, which includes a velodrome, netball courts and sports fields, and the Badminton Wellington Centre lies to the south of the park.

The only watercourse of note on Mount Victoria is the Waipapa Stream, which originates from two headwater branches on the Hataitai side of Mount Victoria and travels down the valley in Hataitai to Evans Bay. The Waipapa Stream was culverted in the early twentieth century.

Torlesse Complex rocks (alternating greywacke sandstone and mudstone (argillite), known as Wellington Greywacke) underlie Mount Victoria. The Wellington Greywacke rocks are "metamorphosed, highly deformed and variably weathered".

In 1863 a Mr Haybittle reported finding quartz containing gold on Mount Victoria and on a beach below. In 1870 the Wellington Independent reported that a tunnel of 100 feet had been driven into the Evans Bay side of Mount Victoria in the hope of finding a gold-bearing quartz reef. This was hoped to be linked to the one at Ngauranga.

=== Wind ===
Wellington is prone to strong winds and the top of Mount Victoria is completely exposed. Writing in 1909, journalist Frank Morton described the wind on reaching the top of Mount Victoria on a particularly unpleasant day as being "like coming butt up against a very stalwart ox running full-speed down-hill. It was the sort of wind that blows a man's eyes into his head while it gives him a clean shave". He said that the best way to calculate the wind velocity on Mount Victoria was to take the wind speed in Willis Street, a street in the commercial district of Wellington, and multiply it by a factor of 10.

On 13 October 1883 part of the flagstaff at the Signal Station was destroyed in a severe gale, and in 1907 the keeper at the signal station was blown over a bank, suffering injuries that resulted his death months later.

When the Gateways apartment block was built on an exposed ridge at Roseneath in the 1960s, the chairman of the building's management organisation reported that pressure build-up during a strong north westerly wind made it impossible to open any balcony door "and our women occupiers in particular, are imprisoned in the building, and on occasions, male occupiers must use the fire escape to leave the building". Several tenants were hospitalised after being blown over. The wind problem was so bad that doors in the building had to be redesigned.

=== Vegetation ===
Writing in 1921, historian and amateur archaeologist Henry Maynard Christie noted that:

In pre-pakeha days the [Hataitai] valley had presented a pleasing picture, with its heavy timber growing on the slopes and along the banks of the [Waipapa] stream. That the place had been heavily wooded is almost certain by the presence or quantities of logs and roots of matai, miro, rata, and some of the soft woods, that have been dug from adjacent bogs. In ditching and road-forming on the swamps at the back of Moxham Avenue, some very substantial timber was uncovered.

Although parts of Mount Victoria may have supported a temperate broadleaf-podocarp forest before human habitation, any such forest had long disappeared by 1840 when European settlers arrived. At that time, the north-facing slopes of Mount Victoria were covered with "scrubby plants such as manuka, kanuka, tauhinu, flax, fern and native grasses", as well as matagouri. North-facing slopes were dry and exposed, with strong north-west winds and little surface fresh water. Sheep and cattle were grazed on Mount Victoria from the 1840s. They trod down the fern and scrubby plants, allowing grasses to displace them. By the 1860s Mount Victoria was windswept and exposed and covered in grass pasture. Gorse and broom were planted as hedges but soon got out of control and were also a fire hazard.

From the 1870s, planting of conifers such as radiata pine and macrocarpa began at the base of Mount Victoria around the asylum (now Government House), Wellington College and Pirie Street. Conifers were good at handling north-westerly gales, clay soil and dry conditions. Further conifer plantings were made on Mount Victoria and other parts of the Town Belt from the 1880s to 1932, and many of these trees still survive. Eucalyptus and pōhutukawa were also planted during this period.

More recently, aging pine trees have been selectively removed and areas of Mount Victoria have been replanted with native trees and shrubs. Wellington City Council notes that "a return to native vegetation would result in low diversity coastal forest on the higher ground with taller species confined to the moister gullies".

Wellington from the Mount Victoria lookout

== History ==
=== Māori settlements ===
Before the arrival of Europeans there were two known pā (fortified settlements) on Mount Victoria. Historian Elsdon Best recorded that the ancient name of Point Jerningham was Omarukaikaru, and that Te Waiherere Pā ("gushing water") was located on the headland above the point, possibly where Roseneath School is now. A house at the pā was called Waipuna ("a spring"). The name of the pā and principal dwelling imply that there was a water source nearby. A notable chief at this pā was Te Rangi-Kai-Kore.

Ngāi Tara people lived in Te Akatarewa Pā, which was said to be located approximately above the tunnels on the Te Ranga a Hiwi ridge south of the summit. Historian Leslie Adkin states that a food cultivation area near the Basin Reserve (which was formerly a swamp or wetland) was connected to the pā. Hinekiri, daughter of Te Rangi-Kai-Kore, lived at Te Akatarewa and was said to be the person who named Motu Kairangi, the ancient name of the Miramar Peninsula in the days when it was still an island. Te Ranga a Hiwi ridge is named for Hiwi, a son of Hinekiri.

By 1850, there were no pā on Mount Victoria. A 1925 newspaper report stated that in the early nineteenth century invading Muaupoko, Ngati Rauru, Ngāti Apa and Ngāti Ruanui under Te Kopara had destroyed Waiherere Pā and Te Akatarewa Pā, along with Uruhau Pā at Island Bay. Writing in 1959, Adkin stated that no trace of Te Akatarewa Pā remained.

=== Town Belt ===
Mount Victoria is within the area of land set aside to provide access to green areas for all the town's citizens when Wellington was laid out by the New Zealand Company in 1840. The Wellington Town Belt was intended to be a "broad belt of land, which [...] the Company intends to be public property, on condition that no buildings ever be erected upon it".

In spite of the intention to preserve the land for the public, sections of the Town Belt have been built upon. The Provincial Government took 143 acres of Town Belt at Mount Victoria for what is now Wellington College in 1874, and for Wellington Hospital including a lunatic asylum in 1876. A further 5 acres were set apart for a signal station. In 1909, 2.5 acres were set aside for a water reservoir to service the housing areas being built on the higher slopes of Mount Victoria in the suburbs of Mount Victoria, Oriental Bay, and Roseneath. This was followed by central government taking land for Wellington East Girls' College in 1925. Over one million exotic trees, mostly pines, macrocarpa and eucalyptus, were planted on the Town Belt between 1924 and 1944.

=== Farming ===
Sheep and cattle were farmed on Mount Victoria for a number of years from the 1840s, with Wellington's Town Board (now the City Council) tendering out land leases. In May 1877 a letter from a Wellington resident was published in The New Zealand Times, pointing out that lessees of the Town Belt, including Mount Victoria, did not have the right to lease the land, and fencing should not be erected by them on the land as it was open to the public. This appears to have been ignored by the Council as in June 1877 it was announced that almost 900 acres of the Town Belt were to be leased for 14 years, including almost 70 acres on Mount Victoria. All the leases that remained at the end of 1911 were terminated by the Council.

=== Roads ===
During the 19th century, several tracks were established through the Town Belt on Mount Victoria to connect the city and Newtown to Roseneath, Kilbirnie and points further east. As the city developed, demand grew for roads that could take a horse and cart, and later on, motor vehicles.

Constable Street was extended to Kilbirnie over the hill at the southern end of the Mount Victoria ridge in the late 1860s, but the grade was steep so in 1905 a cutting was made to improve access to Kilbirnie. Carlton Gore Road from Oriental Bay up the hill to Roseneath was formed in the 1890s and improved in the 1920s. This road is notable as an early civil engineering project: the roadway is cantilevered out from the hillside and there is a hairpin bend halfway up.

With the opening up of Hataitai for development in the early 1900s, the developers explored ways of connecting the suburb to the city by either a tunnel or a road across Mount Victoria. The Council deemed a tunnel preferable to a steep road over the hill, and the Hataitai Bus Tunnel was opened in 1907 for trams only. Pedestrians still had to walk over the hill.

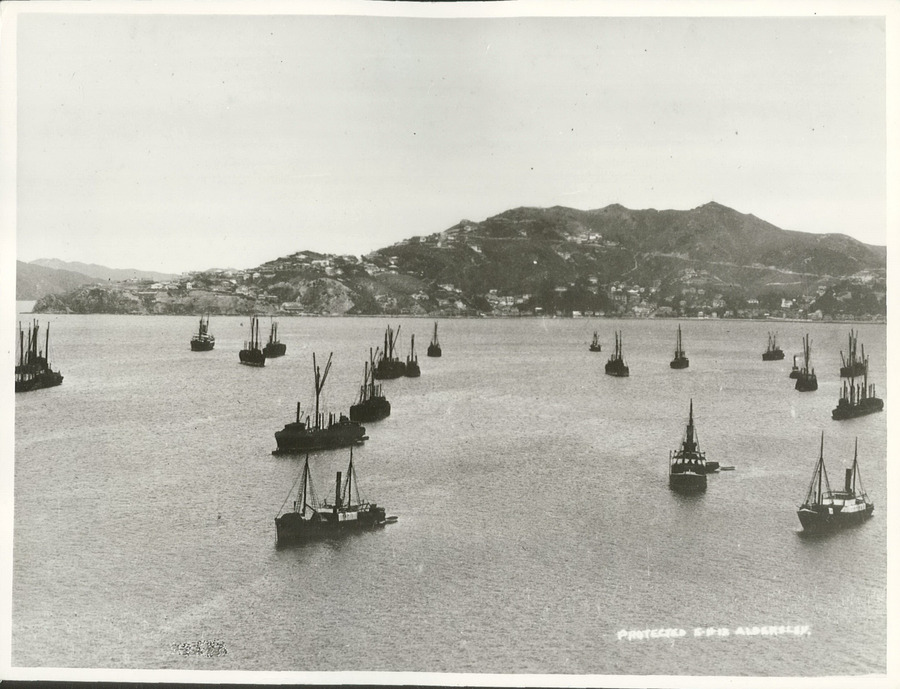
Mount Victoria in 1913 showing Palliser Road climbing from right to left above Oriental Bay

Alexandra Road runs from Newtown along the ridge of Mount Victoria to Roseneath. For most of its length it passes through forested Town Belt land, before dipping into residential Hataitai. It was formed in 1909 when the Council approved construction of a carriageway along the ridge from Constable Street to the Mount Victoria summit as a means to provide relief to the unemployed in the city. The road was widened and improved from the 1920s. At this time, the hillsides were still bare and the road provided a scenic drive with unimpeded views of the city and harbour. As trees were planted and reached maturity some of the views were lost.

=== Quarries ===
In the 19th century various quarries on Mount Victoria produced metal (gravel) for city streets and harbour reclamation. In the 1870s, blasting of rock for road metalling was being carried out at the base of Mount Victoria at Majoribanks Street. A second quarry existed from the 1870s near the base of Carlton Gore Road at Oriental Bay. A temporary railway line was built in the 1880s to take spoil from the quarry for the Te Aro reclamation. The quarry was still in use in 1913 but after this date was turned into a small park.

There was another quarry at the top of Ellice Street, which was in operation by 1882. Rock from this quarry was also used to surface city streets. The Ellice Street quarry fell into disuse between 1910 and 1920, and the site was later used for various purposes including as a rifle range, a rubbish truck parking area, and a film location for the Lord of the Rings movies.

=== Military use ===
During the 19th and early 20th century the undeveloped spaces of Mount Victoria were used by military groups for target practice, field exercises and mock battles, and signalling practice.

In 1886, following the Russian Scare of the 1870s, there was a suggestion that guns should be installed on Mount Victoria as part of the city's defences, but defences in that period were instead built on the Miramar Peninsula overlooking the entrance to Wellington Harbour.

During World War 2, anti-aircraft defences were built on Mount Victoria near Alexandra Road above the Hataitai Bus Tunnel. Four concrete gun emplacements were built and 4-inch heavy ack-ack guns were installed by December 1942. There was also a searchlight, engine room, plotting rooms and an observation post. The site was decommissioned in 1944 and demolished in 1970.

A saluting battery began operation at Point Jerningham, a northern spur of Mount Victoria, in 1918. This is New Zealand's only permanent saluting battery. The New Zealand Army fires four 25-pound guns at the battery on special occasions, for example a 21-gun salute for the birthday of Queen Elizabeth II.

=== Signal station and time gun (the cannon) ===
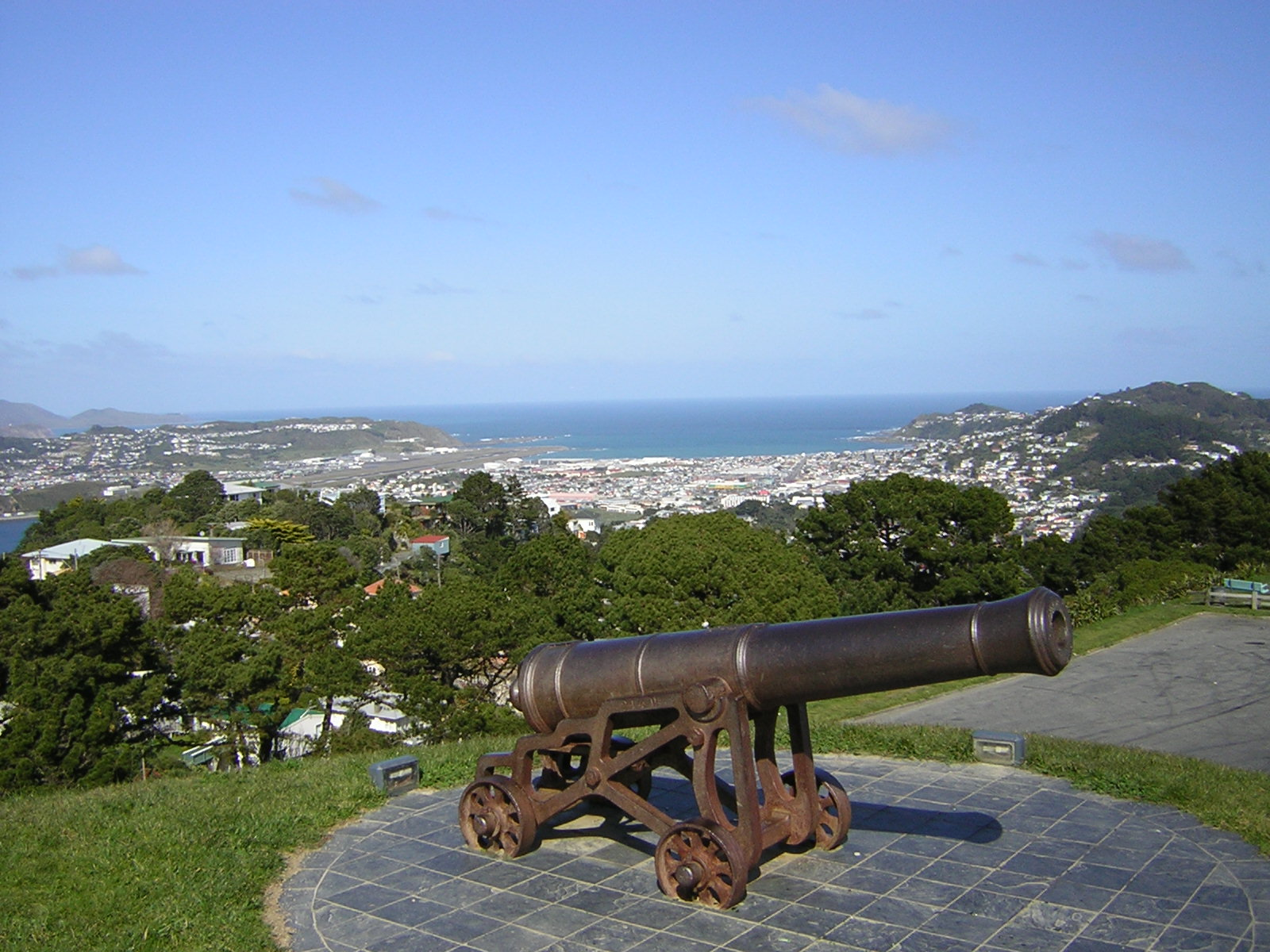
Signal cannon on Mount Victoria

In 1866 a signal relay station was set up by the Wellington Harbour Master on five acres of land at the summit of Mount Victoria. The station was used to relay messages from the Beacon Hill Signal Station to the city using signal flags which conveyed information about shipping entering the harbour. The Beacon Hill Signal Station would fly flags indicating the information, and the signaller at Mount Victoria would then replicate the signal for interested parties at the port of Wellington. This system meant that the signaller at Mount Victoria had to keep a constant watch on the Beacon Hill station. In 1909 the Harbour Board linked the two stations by telephone so that the watch became less irksome. Mrs Ruth France was appointed as the first keeper and lived in a house at the summit built for the signal station. She was replaced in 1873 by her son Frederick France. The signal station ceased operations in 1940, and the derelict station house was burned down by the fire service in 1957. The area previously occupied by the signal station was developed as a lookout area in 1964.

In 1877 the government and Wellington City Council agreed to place a time gun on Mount Victoria, to be operated by the signal station keeper. The gun was to be fired each day at 12 noon so that people could set their clocks and watches. An old cast iron cannon, (Note: The gun is cast iron but some sources incorrectly describe the cannon as being constructed in bronze.) a Royal Artillery 24 pounder, was shipped from Auckland to Wellington. A gun of this type was generally 9 foot 6 inches long and weighed 2.5 (imperial) tons, and the council had difficulty finding a way to get it to the top of Mount Victoria. Eventually the Artillery Volunteers took on the job: a team of 18 men took a week to move the gun from the city to the summit using block and tackle to get it up the steep slopes. In 1878 a wire was run from the Telegraph office to the gun so it could be remotely set off. The time gun system stopped in 1900. The cannon was last fired in December 1967 by the Royal New Zealand Artillery, to celebrate the centenary of the Wellington Artillery.

=== Reservoir ===
In 1909, residents in the higher areas of Roseneath and Mount Victoria requested that a reservoir be built, as they had been experiencing difficulties with the water supply. Wellington City Council set aside 2.5 acres on Mount Victoria for a 200,000 gallon capacity reservoir which was completed in 1910. It is located near the Mount Victoria trig station and radio tower on Lookout Road.

=== Radio and television transmission ===
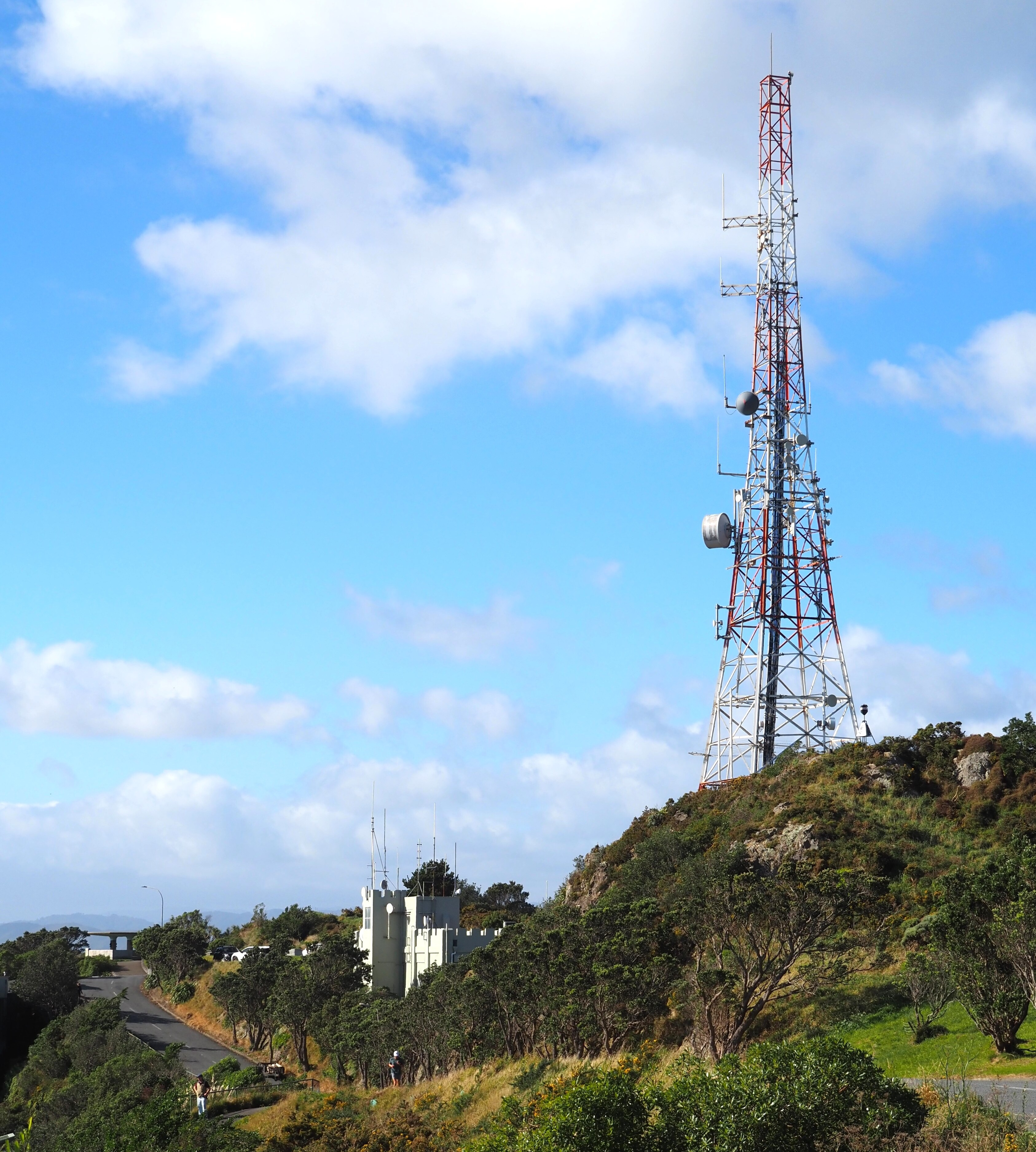
Communications building, tower and trig station on Mt Victoria - from the west

Two radio transmitting towers were erected along the ridge line at the top of Mount Victoria in 1927. The steel lattice towers were 47 m (154 ft) high with an aerial stretched between them. The towers enabled station 2YA to become the first radio station to broadcast nationwide and made it the "second most powerful station in the British Empire". Broadcasts were made from a studio in central Wellington, with the signal being sent to the transmitters by telephone wire. Between the two towers was a building housing the transmitting equipment, notable for its battlements with crenellated walls. A third mast, 100 ft (30 m) high and made of wood, was erected on Mount Victoria in 1933. After the 1931 Hawke's Bay earthquake the government decided it needed a more powerful station, so a new transmission site was built and opened at Titahi Bay in 1937.

Television broadcasts began in Wellington on 1 July 1961. The existing radio towers and building on Mount Victoria were used for television transmission, with an antenna added to one of the old radio towers. A television studio in the city sent signals to Mount Victoria using a microwave link. In 1967, the Mount Victoria transmitter was replaced with a more powerful transmitter at Mount Kaukau.

One of the steel towers at Mount Victoria was removed in the 1990s, but as of 2026 the other tower is still in use and the associated building is still standing.

== Recreational use ==
Mount Victoria has been used for casual and organised walking and running from the early days of Wellington's settlement. One of the first events recorded was a downhill race from the summit to a public house on Te Aro Flat in January 1844. As of 2026, a network of around 25 km (16 mi) of trails has been constructed on Mount Victoria for recreational purposes including walking and mountain biking. Approximately 15 km (9.3 mi) of trail is designated "walker-priority" shared trail and 2.5 km (1.6 mi) as "walker-only". The remaining trails are designated as "bike only".

=== Mount Victoria Lookout Walkway ===
The trails on Mount Victoria include a marked loop walking trail to the summit lookout and back, starting from either Courtenay Place or Oriental Bay. Most of the trails on the hill are unsealed. The access points for the marked Mount Victoria Lookout Walkway trail are from Lawson Place at the top of Majoribanks Street, and from Palliser Road in Oriental Bay. The trail meets with the Matairangi Nature Trail and the Southern Walkway, providing many alternative entry and exit points.

=== Southern Walkway ===
The Southern Walkway is an almost 11 km walk from Oriental Bay to Island Bay, mostly through the Town Belt. The first half of the walk takes in Mount Victoria and Te Ranga a Hiwi ridge to the south as far as Kilbirnie. The walk is notable for its views of the city and harbour and the "shade and tranquillity" of the forested areas of the Town Belt along Alexandra Road.

=== Matairangi Nature Trail ===
The Matairangi Nature Trail is a family-friendly walk about 500 m long developed by Wellington City Council. The walking route begins at the intersection of Alexandra Road and Lookout Road near the summit. It has 'habitat stations' along the way. These consist of play equipment, including a treehouse and a slide, that encourages children to think about nature and local wildlife.

=== Mountain biking ===
Mount Victoria has been a location for mountain biking since off-road cycles became available from the late 1980s.The bike trails were built with approval from Wellington City Council. As of 2026 the bike trails are maintained by volunteers from the Matairangi Trail Group, with input from Wellington City Council. Volunteer work in the area has included planting over 8,000 native trees in five years. There have been some instances of conflict between walkers and bike riders. The bike trails on Mount Victoria were included in the schedule for the inaugural Wellington Mountain Bike Festival held in February 2026.

=== Hataitai Park ===
Hataitai Park is located on the eastern side of the ridge extending south from Mount Victoria. Spoil from excavation of the Mount Victoria Tunnel during 1929-1930 was used to fill in a small gully to create a large recreation reserve. During World War 2 a military camp was established at the park, with some of the military buildings later becoming sports clubrooms. From the 1940s to the mid-1960s there was also a workingmen's camp at the park in an area that is now used as a mountain bike practice trail. The park has courts used for tennis and netball, a volleyball sand court, rugby fields, softball diamonds, clubrooms and the Badminton Wellington Centre.

=== Velodrome ===
The Wellington Velodrome was built in 1967 above Hataitai Park on a flat area created during construction of the Mount Victoria Tunnel in 1931. It is a 333 m outdoor concrete 28-degree banked track that has been used for various cycling competitions. The track was resurfaced between 2016 and 2020.

=== Children's playgrounds ===
Two playgrounds on Mount Victoria offer views of the city as well as provision of play equipment and space for a picnic. The Crescent play area, which has one of Wellington's longest slides, overlooks Oriental Bay, the central city and the Hutt Valley, while the Alexandra Road play area has views of Evans Bay and the Miramar Peninsula. The Pirie Street playground adjacent to the Hataitai Tunnel contains a calisthenics park with structures such as parallel bars for adult exercising using body weight.

== Points of interest ==
=== Summit lookout ===
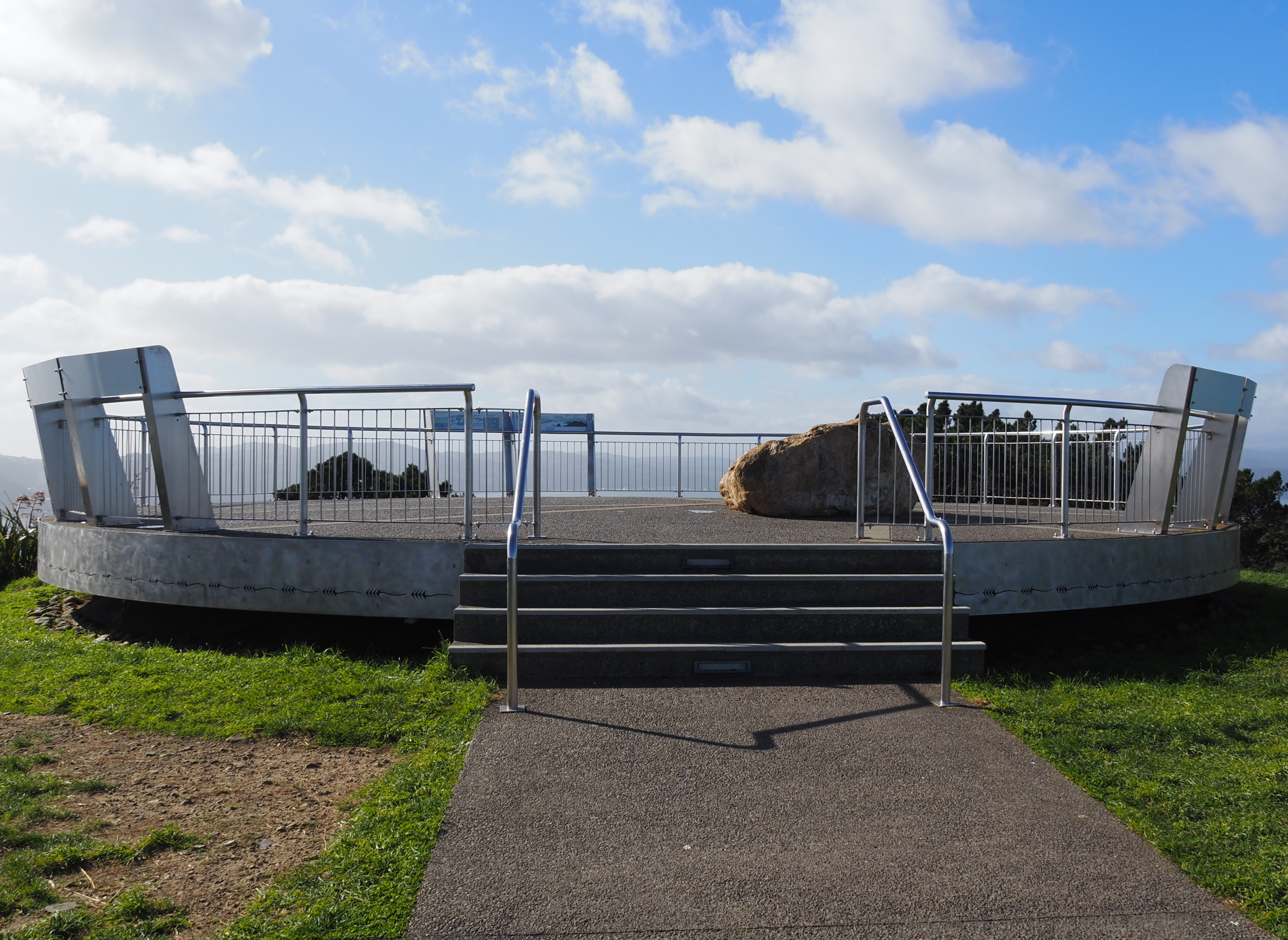
Mount Victoria summit lookout in 2026

An early visitor to the city described the view from Mount Victoria in 1846:

From that elevation, the scenic effects are superb; hill, dale, and water are spread out in infinite variety and majesty. Wellington is completely commanded from this sublime birdseye view; the full extent of the valley of the Hutt, with its clustering tiers of lordly mountains, lies open to your ken. Evans' Bay [...] glanced blue and beautiful in the glorious sunlight; whilst, harbour-wards, the towering spars and square yards of the men-of-war appeared to be diminished to mere whip-sticks. It was, truly, a heavenly day.

The lookout at the highest point of Mount Victoria is a popular visitor destination, providing 360° views of Wellington city and suburbs, the inner harbour, Evans Bay and the Miramar Peninsula. The lookout can be accessed by car, public bus or by walking up from the city via the many tracks on the hill. The lookout was constructed in 1964 on the former site of the signal station. It was upgraded in 2004-2007, winning a bronze award in the New Zealand Institute of Landscape Architects (NZILA) Resene Pride of Place Landscape Architecture Awards. During the upgrade, a pou (pole) designed by master carver Rangi Hetet was installed as part of the city's Maori Heritage Trail ‘Te Ara O Nga Tupuna’ (the path of our ancestors). A cannon formerly used as a time gun is located at the base of the stairs leading to the lookout. In 2026, Lonely Planet described the Mount Victoria summit lookout as the most impressive viewpoint in Wellington City.

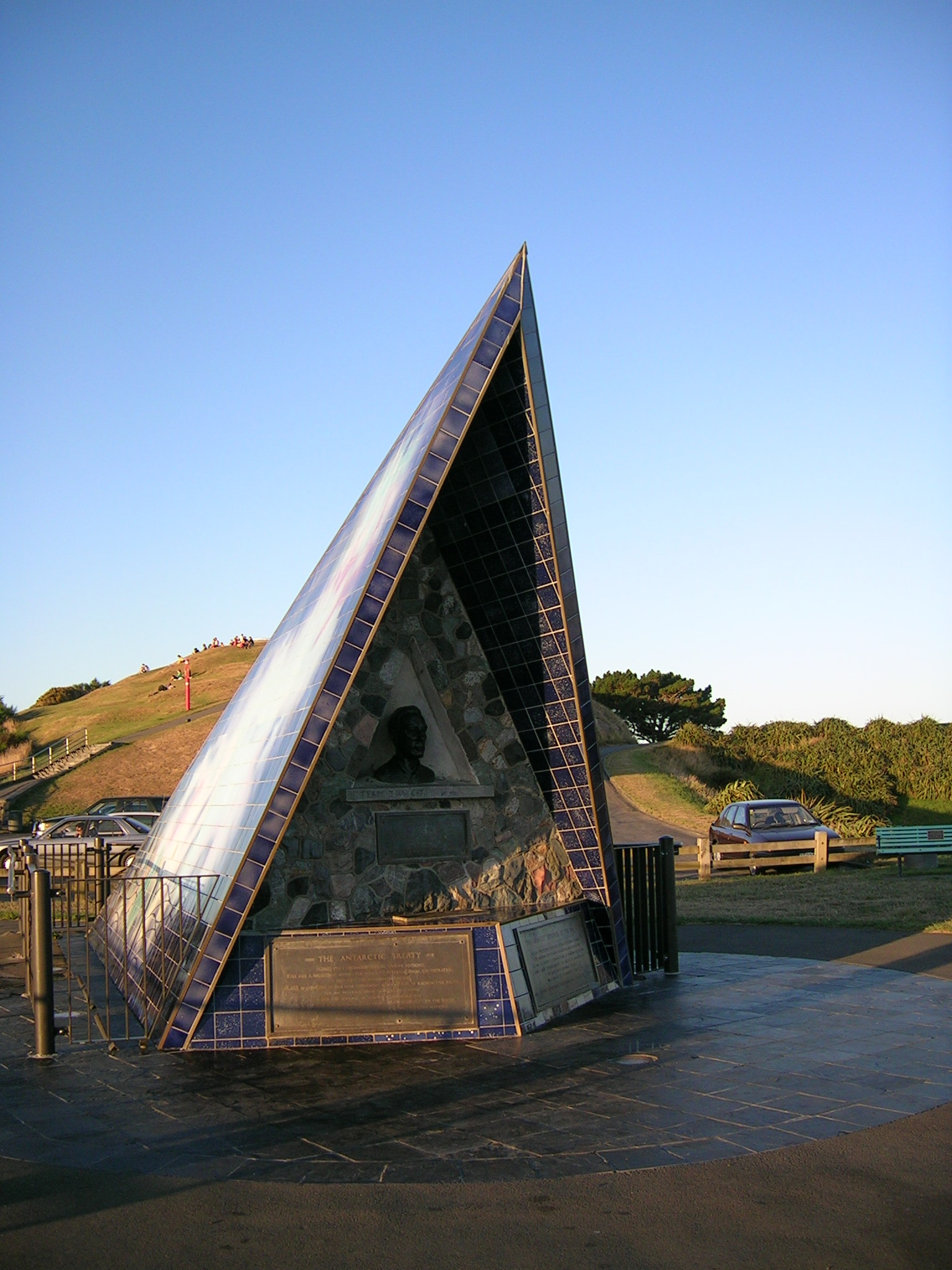
Byrd Memorial

=== Richard Byrd Memorial ===
The Byrd Memorial (officially, the New Zealand National Memorial to Rear Admiral Richard E. Byrd) is located below the lookout at the summit of Mount Victoria. It commemorates Richard Byrd, an American polar explorer and aviator who used Wellington as a base for many of his Antarctic expeditions. The memorial was unveiled on 11 March 1962, which was the fifth anniversary of Byrd's death. American president John F. Kennedy stated that the memorial would be "a symbol of enduring friendship between the United States, land of his birth, and New Zealand, the country with which he was so closely associated in his great adventures". The monument takes the form of a polar tent, built up with rocks from Antarctica, with a bust of Byrd at the centre, facing out to the sea and Antarctica. Plaques at the base of the memorial commemorate the 1959 Antarctic Treaty; Byrd ("the greatest explorer of the air age"); and Paul Siple, an explorer who served with Byrd.

=== Wellington Centennial Memorial and lookout ===
This memorial is located on Lookout Road, about 330 m northwest of the summit lookout. The lookout has level access and a roof providing protection from inclement weather, and offers views of Wellington. It was constructed during 1939 to celebrate the centennial of the establishment of Wellington by settlers in 1840. The granite walls of the lookout are made from stone from the first Waterloo Bridge in London, opened in 1817 by the Duke of Wellington. The memorial houses busts of the founders of Wellington Edward Gibbon Wakefield and Arthur Wellesley, the first Duke of Wellington. The busts caused controversy during the 'Black Lives Matter' protests of the early 2020s, with some people arguing that the busts should be removed as they represented colonialism. Wellington City Council responded by removing heritage protection from the memorial.

=== SPCA – The old Fever Hospital ===
The Fever Hospital (also known as the Chest Hospital) on Alexandra Road was constructed during 1917 to 1920, with building progress slowed by its isolated location on the Town Belt. The hospital building and nurses' accommodation building were designed in an Arts and Crafts version of the Queen Anne style, and the hospital is classified by Heritage New Zealand as a 'Historic Place Category 2'. Two wings each with verandahs and sun porches provided light and abundant fresh air to the patients. Initially the hospital was to be a dedicated space for scarlet fever patients, but it was used to treat sick servicemen returned from World War 1, as well as for other infectious diseases including measles, influenza, chicken pox, polio and, in the 1940s, tuberculosis. After World War 2 the introduction of vaccinations and antibiotics led to less demand for the hospital. It was not well maintained and was used only intermittently from 1953 as treatments changed and new facilities were built at Wellington Hospital. In 1973 a new wing was built and the hospital was used as a 'chest hospital', but it closed in 1981. Wellington Polytechnic School of Music used the building from 1987 to 1998. The building lay empty for a time, before reopening as the Wellington home of the SPCA in 2014.

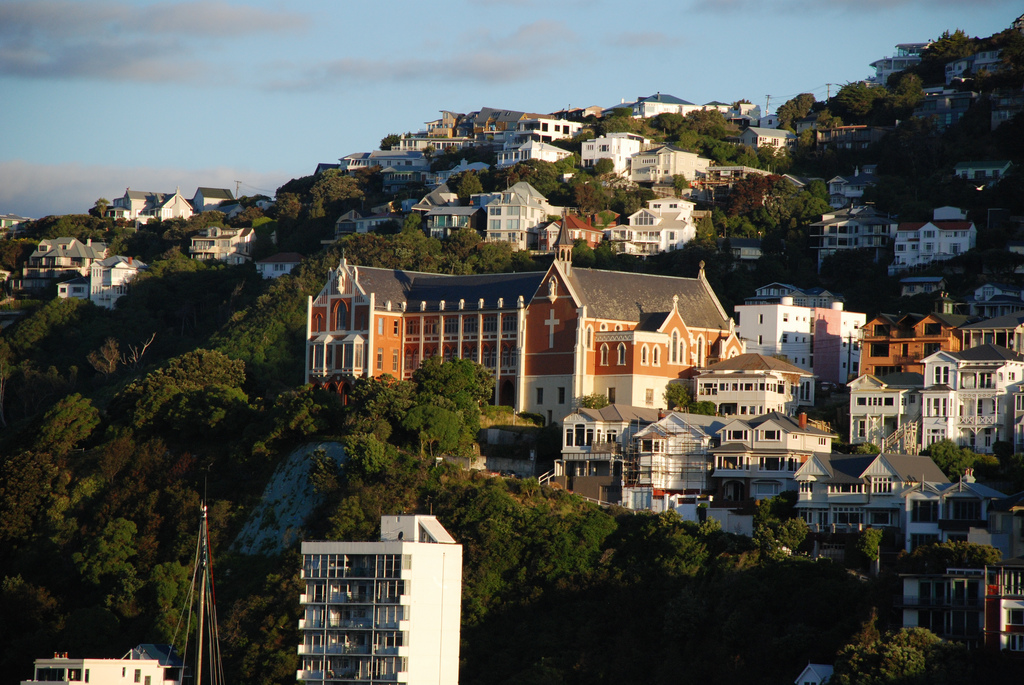
St Gerard's Church and Monastery

=== St Gerard's Church and Monastery ===
The church and monastery are located off Hawker Street on the northern slopes of Mount Victoria on a prominent cliff site overlooking Oriental Bay. St Gerard's Church is a gothic-style brick building constructed in 1908. The church was incorporated into the monastery which was completed in 1932. The church and the monastery are each classified by Heritage New Zealand as a 'Historic Place Category 1'. The building was declared earthquake-prone and the church celebrated its last mass in 2021. The building was sold in 2023. As of 2026, there is no public access to the building.

=== Lord of the Rings locations ===
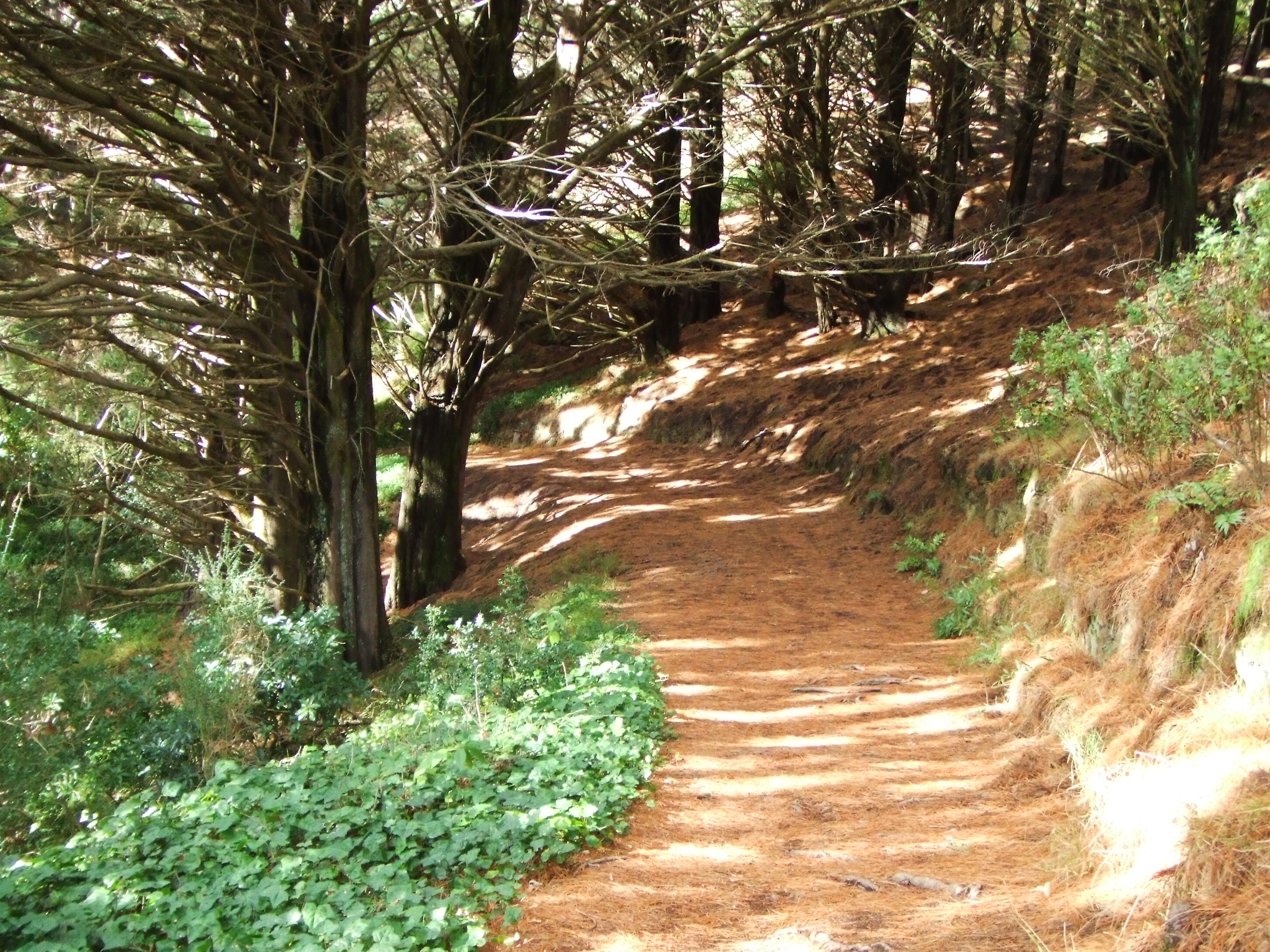
The road to Bree

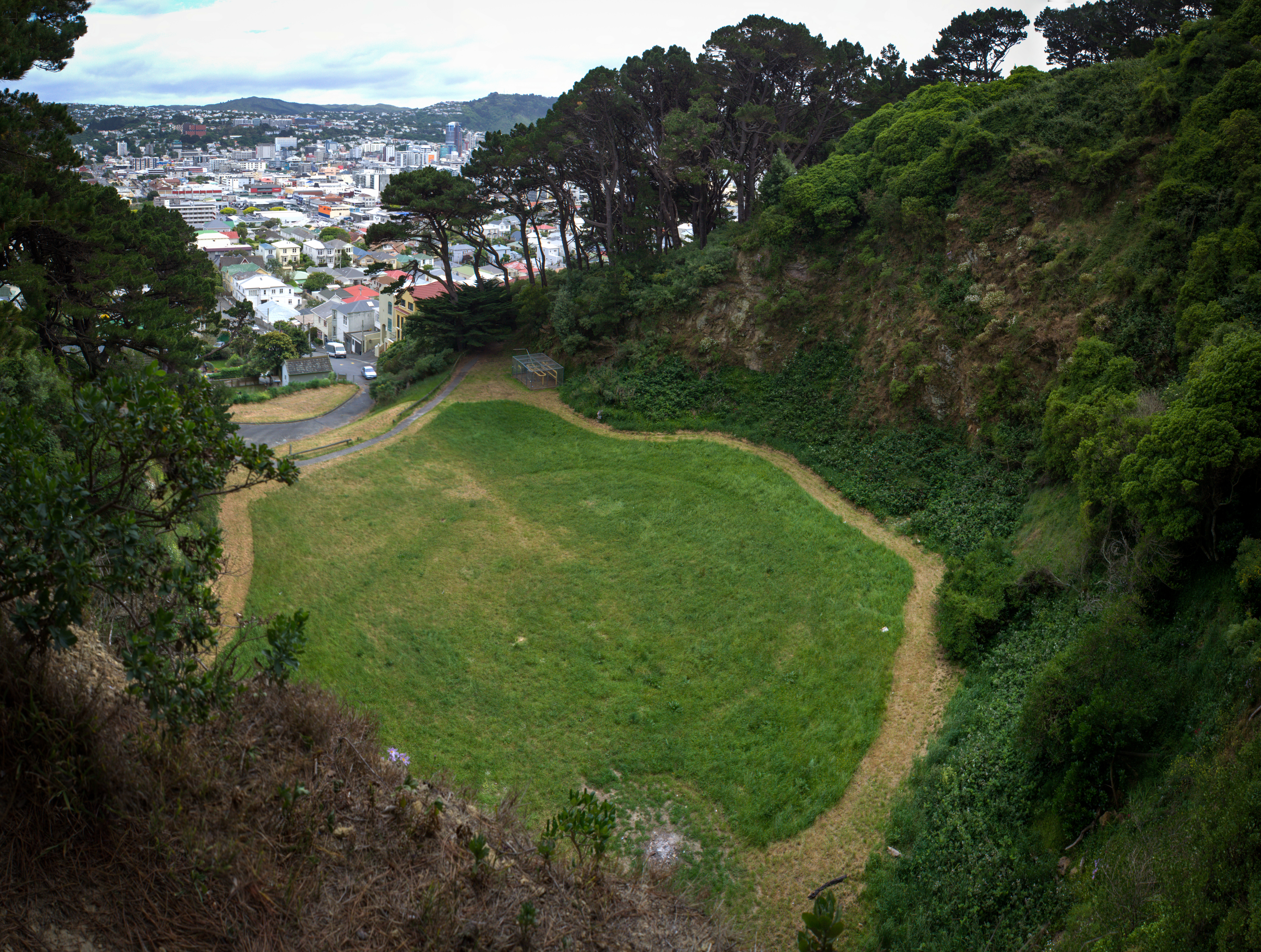
Former quarry above Ellice Street, used as the location for Dunharrow.

Mount Victoria was used for locations in Peter Jackson's The Lord of the Rings film trilogy. The very first footage on the project, the 'Get off the road' scene in The Fellowship of the Ring, was shot off Alexandra Road on 11 October 1999. The 'Hobbit's Hideaway Track' is marked on track signs. The location for the 'Escape from the Nazgûl' scenes is a few hundred metres to the north. Later an old quarry at the top end of Ellice Street (Ellice Park) was used as the Rohirrim camp at Dunharrow.

=== Anne Frank Memorial ===
In 2021, Wellington City Council unveiled a memorial to Holocaust victim Anne Frank at Ellice Park, a disused quarry site above Ellice Street on Mount Victoria. The memorial consists of two steel chairs facing each other and another facing away, representing those who are excluded. Fifteen kōwhai trees planted behind the memorial represent Frank's age at her death in a concentration camp. In 2022, Te Āti Awa gifted a Māori name to the memorial, which is now officially called the 'Anne Frank Memorial Parikōwhai'.

=== Sewage tunnel ventilation shaft ===
A brick tower-like structure on Alexandra Road near the Harriers clubrooms is a ventilation shaft for the Interceptor, Wellington's main sewer line built in the 1890s.

== Tunnels through Mount Victoria ==
As of 2026 there are four tunnels through Mount Victoria.

The Interceptor is the largest pipe in Wellington's sewage system built in the 1890s. A 1.5 km-long tunnel section of the Interceptor, about 2.1 metres high and 1.2 metres wide, passes through a ridge of Mount Victoria from near Hospital Road in Newtown to Duncan Terrace in Kilbirnie.

A single-lane tunnel known as the Hataitai Tunnel or Hataitai Tram Tunnel was constructed during 1906 and opened in April 1907 for scheduled tram services only. It was converted for use by trolley buses in 1963 and is now known as the Hataitai Bus Tunnel. There is no pedestrian access through the bus tunnel.

Mount Victoria Tunnel is a second, bigger tunnel that was opened in 1931 to provide road access to the eastern suburbs. Spoil from the tunnel excavation was used to level an area below the ridge in Hataitai, which became Hataitai Park. The western approach to the tunnel is from the Basin Reserve, and in the east it ends at Hataitai. The tunnel has one lane in each direction and an elevated pedestrian walkway that is also used by cyclists.

In 1974 a pilot tunnel was bored through Mount Victoria as preliminary work for a planned second vehicle tunnel to be funded by the National Roads Board. The pilot tunnel is about 2.4 m (8 ft) in diameter and lies almost parallel to and just north of the Mount Victoria Tunnel. The tunnel ends have been blocked up. The second tunnel project was cancelled in 1981, but as of 2026, a new vehicle tunnel through Mount Victoria is in the planning stages.

== Mysteries and oddities ==
- In 1852 some children playing near the top of the hill came across a human skeleton. It was believed to have been that of a Māori woman and to have been there for many years.
- On what is now Brougham Street, there was an estimated 20-ft deep hole called locally Drans-feldts Lug or the Devils Ear. It was reported in the paper in 1870, but had been there for many years prior.
- In the 1893 New Zealand general election, on being challenged as to his sincerity and fitness to stand, William Thomas Locke Travis challenged his opponents who were over 30 years age to walk with him up the steepest track to the top of Mount Victoria. The story of this challenge was picked up in numerous newspapers throughout New Zealand. Travis lost the election to Robert Stout and came last overall. As to the Mount Victoria challenge, no mention of it being accepted was made in the papers.
- The placing of windmills for generating electricity on Mount Victoria was suggested in the 1911 general election.
