= Carter Fountain =

Fountain in New Zealand

Coordinates: 41°17′23″S 174°47′40″E

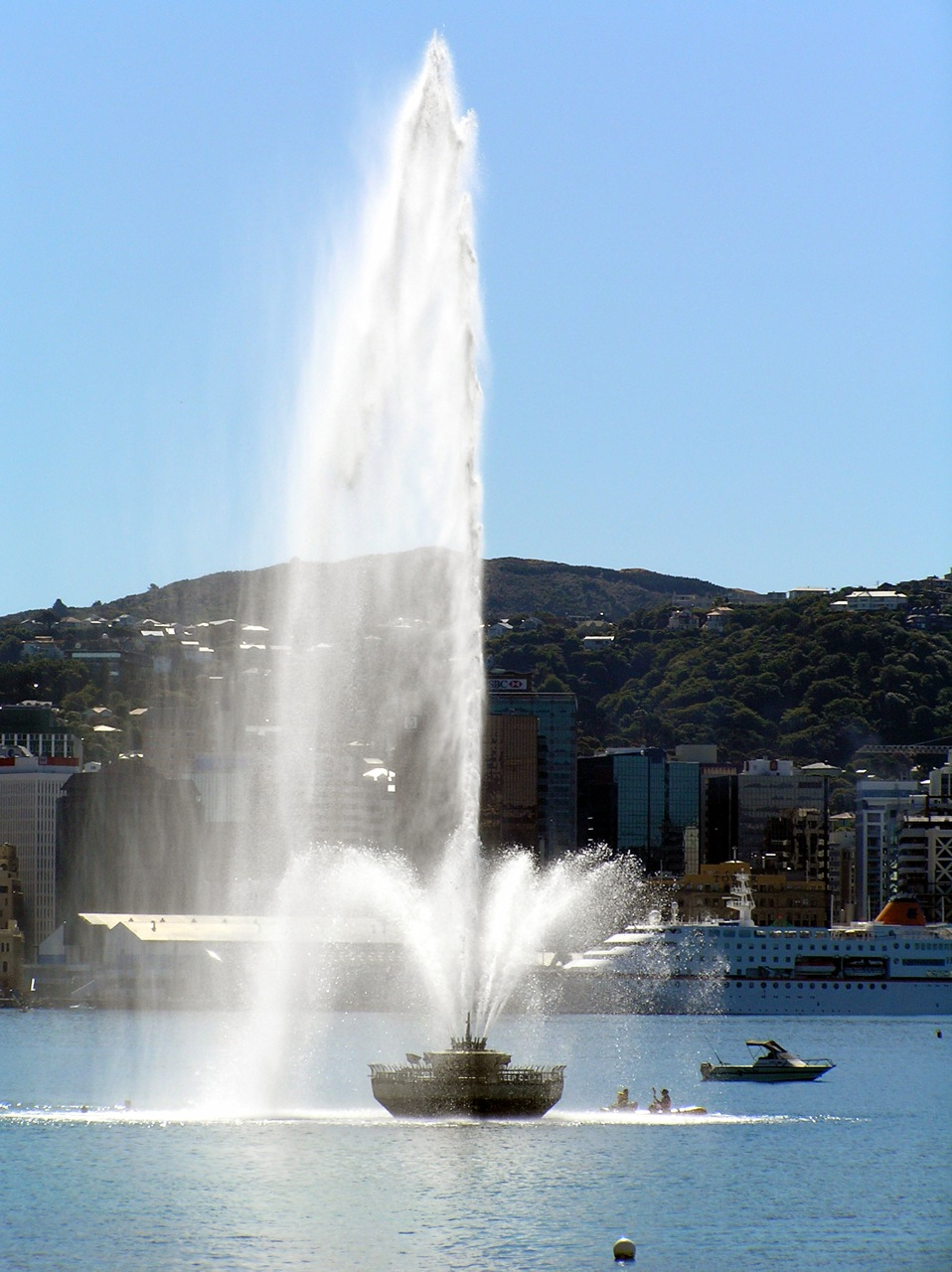
The Carter Fountain in 2005

The Carter Fountain is a distinctive feature 150 metres (490 ft) out in Wellington Harbour from Oriental Bay. Installed in 1973, it was named in memory of the parents of its donor Hugh Carter, who drowned only days after the fountain's inauguration.

== Background ==
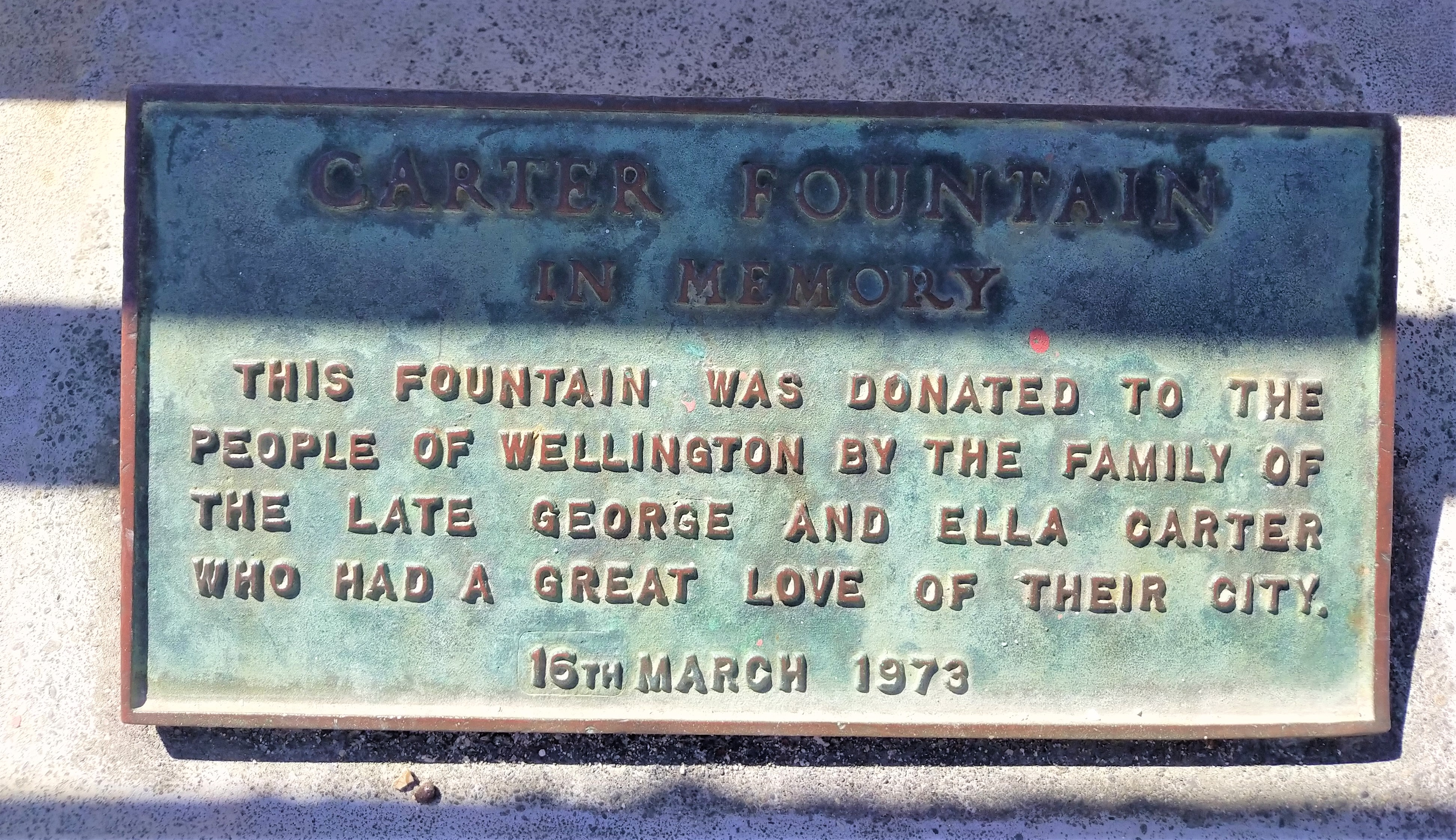
Carter Fountain dedication plaque at band rotunda

The Carter Fountain was a gift to the city of Wellington from local resident and businessman Hugh Carter, as a tribute to his parents George and Ella Carter and the people of Wellington. A plaque was installed on the nearby Oriental Bay Band Rotunda saying: "Carter Fountain. In Memory. This fountain was donated to the people of Wellington by the family of the late George and Ella Carter, who had a great love of their city. 16th March 1973". Carter was inspired by the Jet d'Eau fountain he saw in Geneva in the early 1960s. Construction began in 1972 and cost NZ$75,000. There was some controversy when the project was announced as some residents objected to the fountain on aesthetic reasons or because it might interfere with rowing, or thought the money it cost could have been better spent elsewhere.

The fountain was officially opened on 16 March 1973. Tragedy struck just days after the fountain was officially opened. Carter had moored his launch Kualani in the harbour for the opening of the fountain. He disappeared from the boat on the night of 20/21 March and his body was found in the harbour on 21 March. He was 55.

The fountain was originally maintained by the Wellington Harbour Board, but with the 1989 local government reforms the responsibility transferred to the Wellington City Council.

== Operation ==
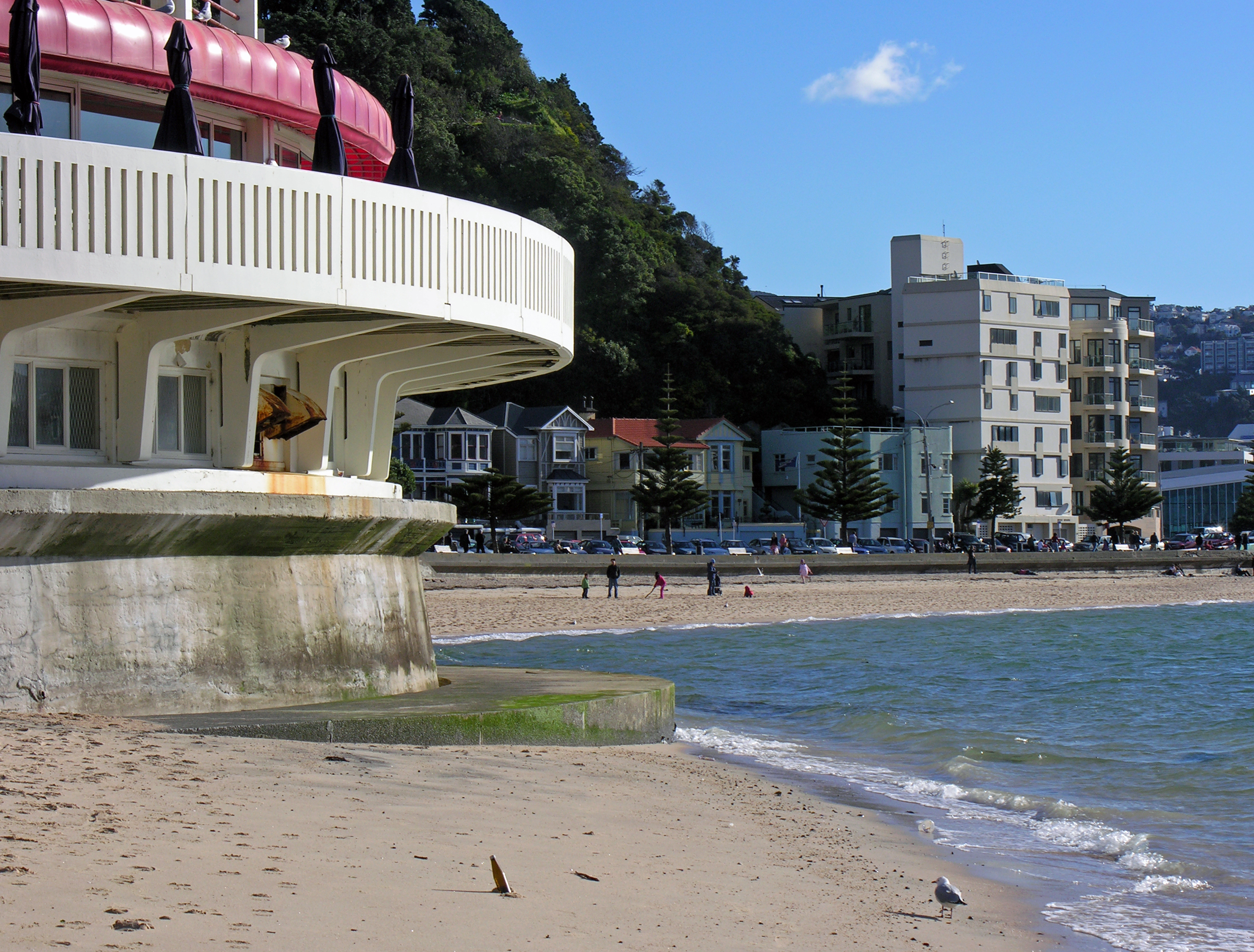
The Band Rotunda houses the land based electrical equipment and a wind sensor

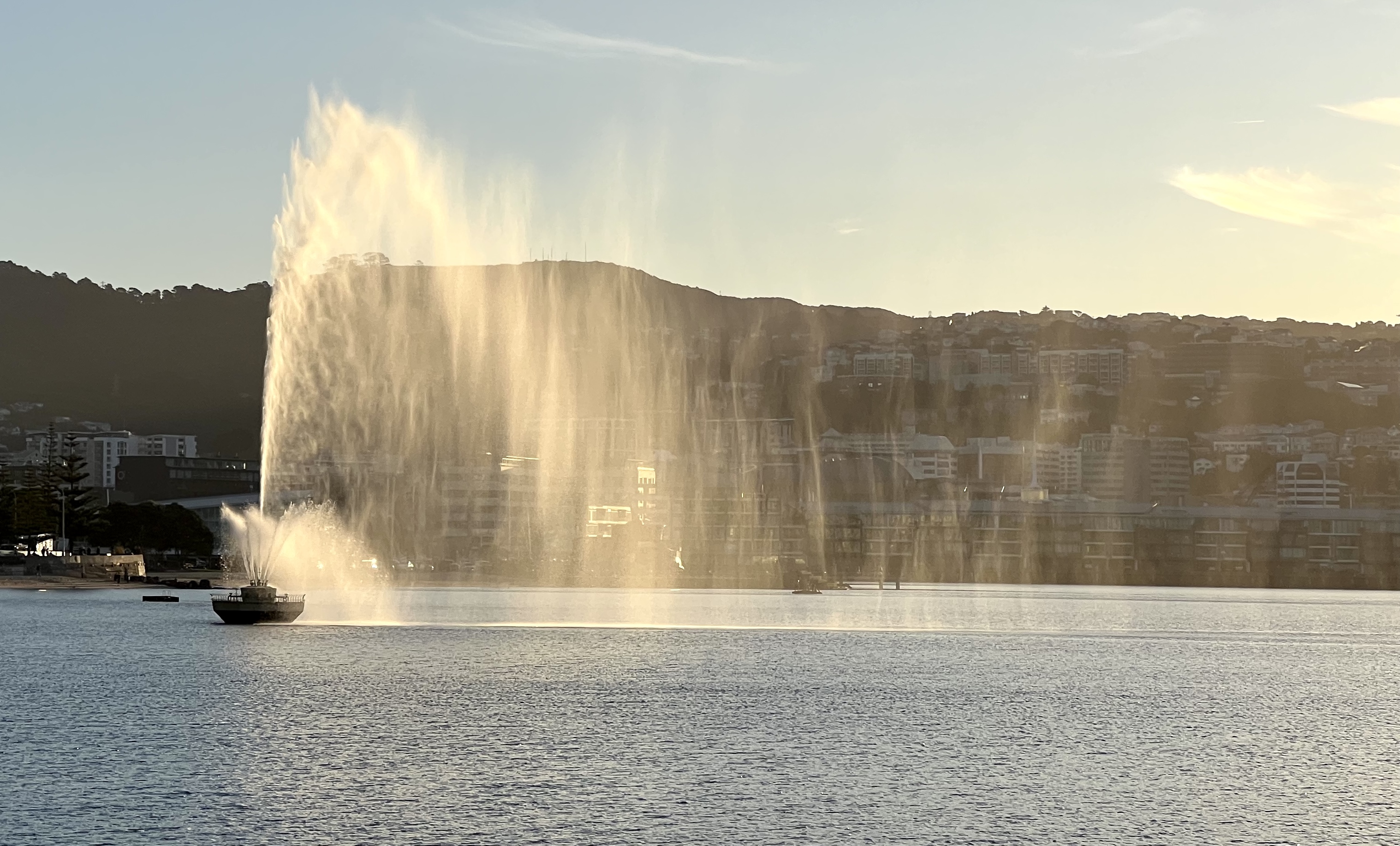
Carter Fountain on a windy day at sunset in April 2025

The fountain spouts water 16 metres (52 ft) into the air. Following complaints from local residents about salt spray, a wind sensor was installed on the Oriental Bay Band Rotunda that prevents the fountain from operating above a given wind speed; sources vary whether this is 8 or 10 knots (15 or 19 km/h; 9.2 or 11.5 mph). The band rotunda also holds the land-based electrical components for the fountain.

Monthly maintenance is carried out by an electrician, who reaches the fountain in a row boat. Twice a year, divers check on the submerged pump. The annual maintenance costs NZ$45,000, of which NZ$20,000 is for electricity. The cost for replacing the pump in 2009 was NZ$29,000, during which time the fountain was out of operation for half a year. Eight floodlights are used to light and colour the fountain. The halogen lights were replaced in 2013 by LED light at a cost of NZ$21,000, with the new lights lasting up to 50,000 hours compared to 2,000 hours previously, and being able to be remote controlled.

The fountain is operated up to four times a day:

- Monday to Thursday: 07:30–09:00, noon–14:00, 16:30–18:00, 19:30–22:30
- Friday: 07:30–09:00, noon–14:00, 16:30–18:00, 19:30–23:00
- Saturday and Sunday: 08:30–16:30, 19:00–23:00
