= Julie Rokotakala =

Julie Rokotakala is an Anglican priest, the Vicar General of the Anglican Diocese of Wellington: the Vicar of Kapiti, formerly of myTawa- Linden, she was Archdeacon of Wellington from 2013 until 2015; and has been Archdeacon of Kāpiti since 2011 and Ohariu since 2013.
