= Roseneath, Wellington =

Suburb of Wellington City, New Zealand

Roseneath
- Suburb
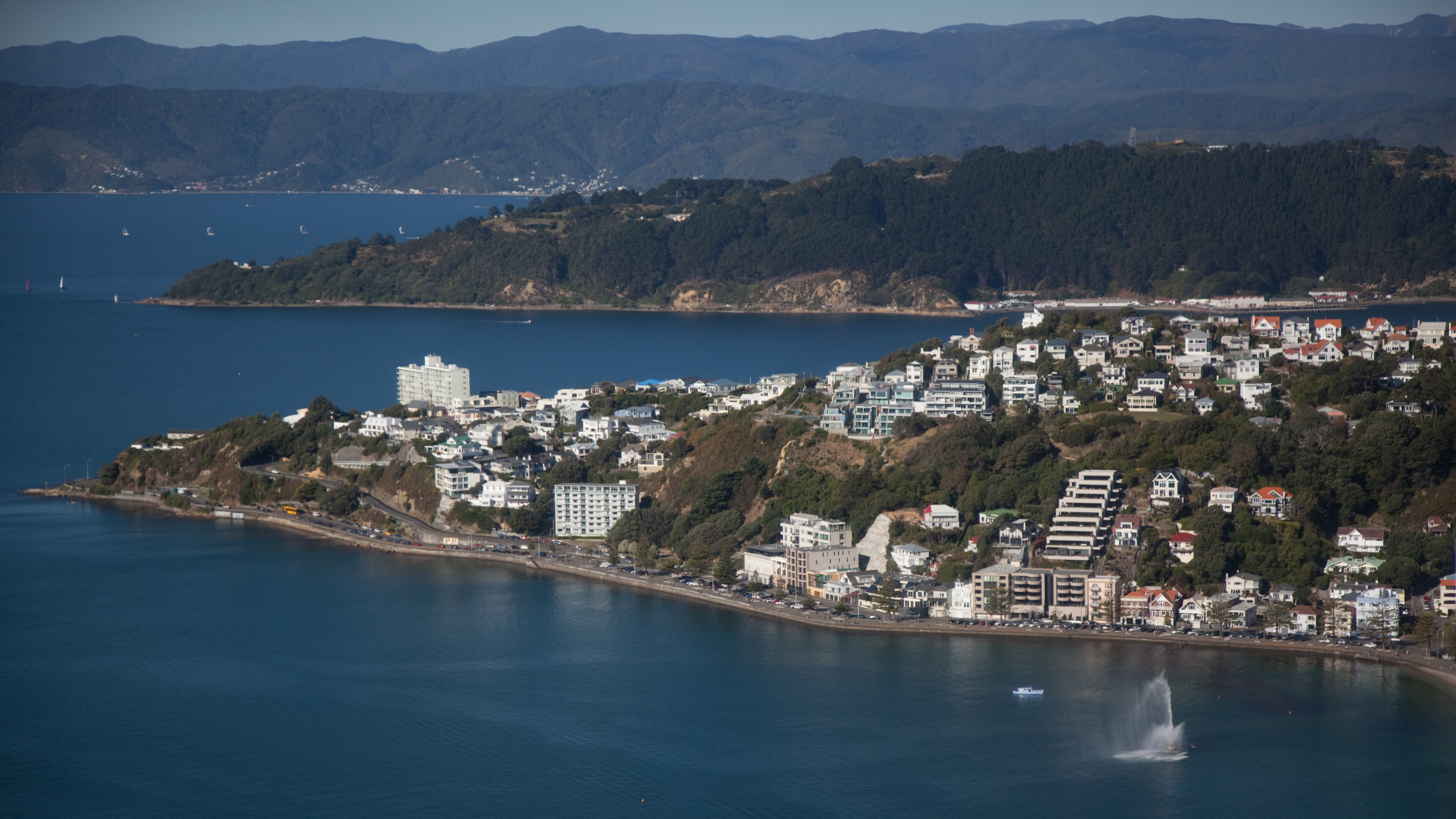
- Roseneath's peninsula, Oriental Bay at its foot
- Interactive map of Roseneath
- Coordinates: 41°17′20″S 174°48′10″E
- Country: New Zealand
- City: Wellington City
- Local authority: Wellington City Council
- Electoral ward: Motukairangi/Eastern Ward; Pukehīnau/Lambton Ward; Te Whanganui-a-Tara Māori Ward

Area
  - Land: 55 ha (140 acres)

Population (June 2025)
  - Total: 1,730
  - Density: 3,100/km^{2} (8,100/sq mi)

	Wellington Harbour
Oriental Bay	Roseneath	Evans Bay
Mount Victoria	Hataitai

Roseneath is an affluent hill suburb of Wellington, New Zealand, located east of Oriental Bay and north of Hataitai on a spur of Mount Victoria.

== History ==
David Wilkinson from Ayrshire, Scotland, was an early Wellington resident and gardener who lived at Oriental Bay in a house named Roseneath Cottage in the 1850s. He operated a tea garden and plant nursery here too, until at least 1891. The Roseneath Estate began to be developed in 1886 and possibly took its name from Wilkinson's business. Sections covering an area from Point Jerningham to Grafton Road down to Evans Bay were released for sale in 1888 and another block covering an area from Grafton Road up the hillside was for sale in 1902. Walking access from Oriental Bay to Roseneath begins at the top of Grass Street outside Wilkinson's house, now 13 Grass Street, and on a terrace at the foot of Wilkinson Street.

St Barnabas Anglican church on Maida Vale Rd was dedicated on 19 November 1899. In January 1924 there was a serious fire in the wooden church, but it was rebuilt.

Gateways Apartments at 19 Maida Vale Rd, next to the church and school, is a large modernist block of 60 flats built in the 1960s.

The headland forming the northern part of Roseneath is called Point Jerningham. A concrete lighthouse was installed in the water off the point in January 1929, replacing an earlier floating light. The lighthouse was transported to the site and lowered into position by the floating crane Hikitia. In 2019 a solar LED beacon was installed in the lighthouse.

Point Jerningham is also the site of New Zealand's only permanent saluting battery, which began operating in 1918. The New Zealand Army fires four 25-pound guns on special occasions, for example a 21-gun salute for the birthday of Queen Elizabeth II.

Next to the saluting battery is the Long Hall. This building was originally a military barracks situated at Mt Victoria during World War 2. In 1947 members of the RSA moved it to its current site and used it as a clubrooms. After 1969 the hall was used as a practice space for Wellington Scottish Pipes and Drums and other uses. In 2008 a trust was formed to restore the building which had become dilapidated.

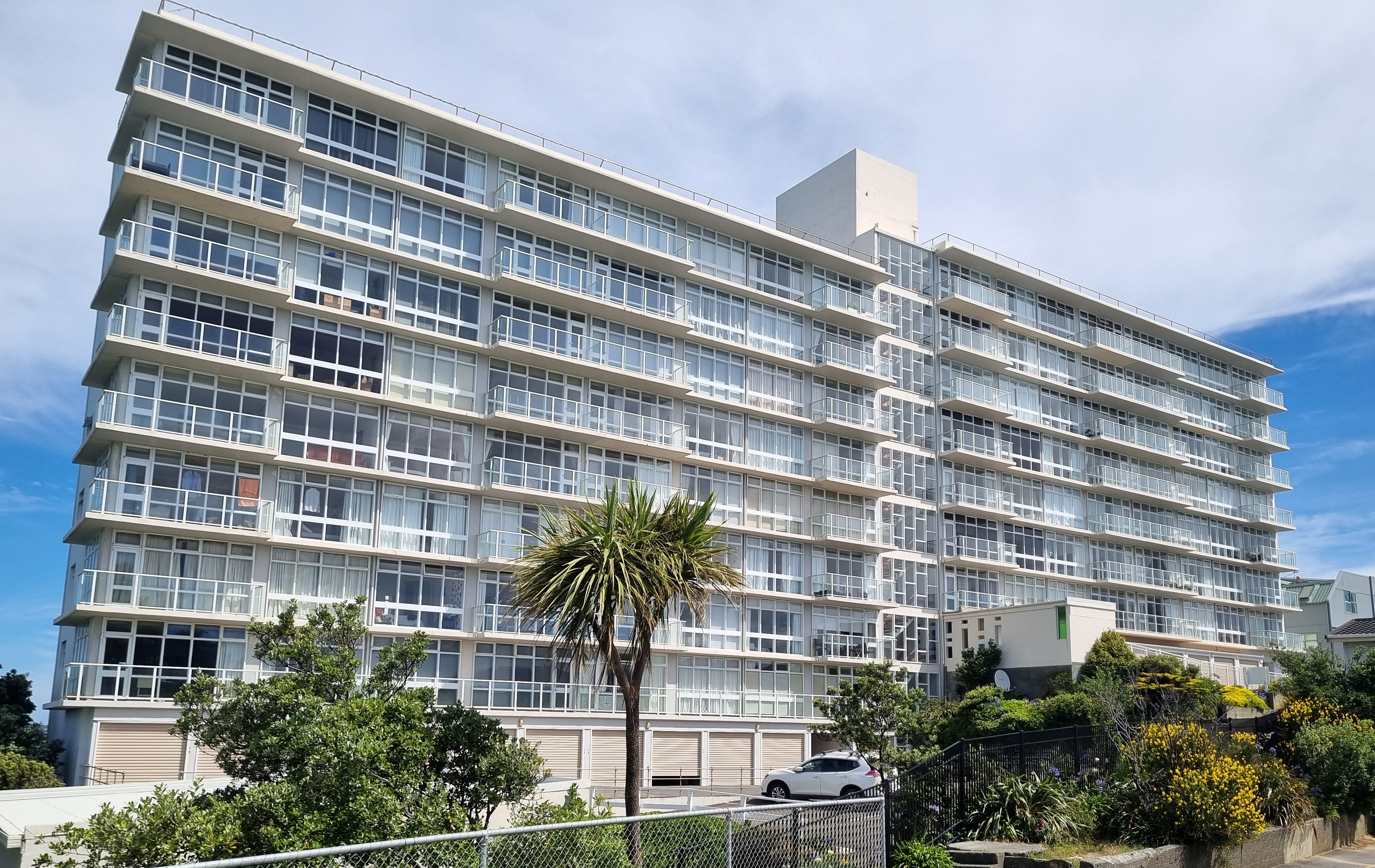
Gateways apartment block

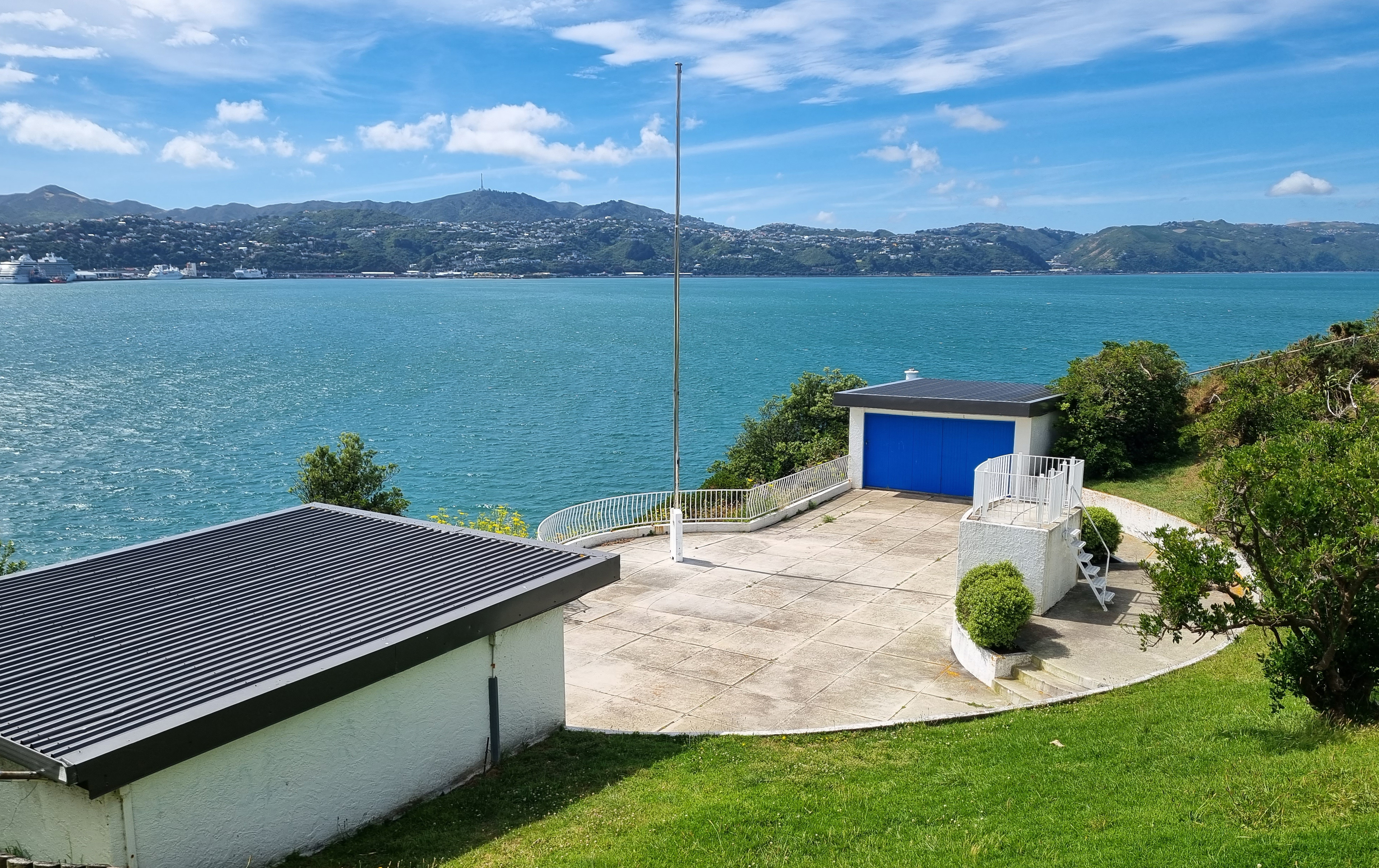
Saluting Battery

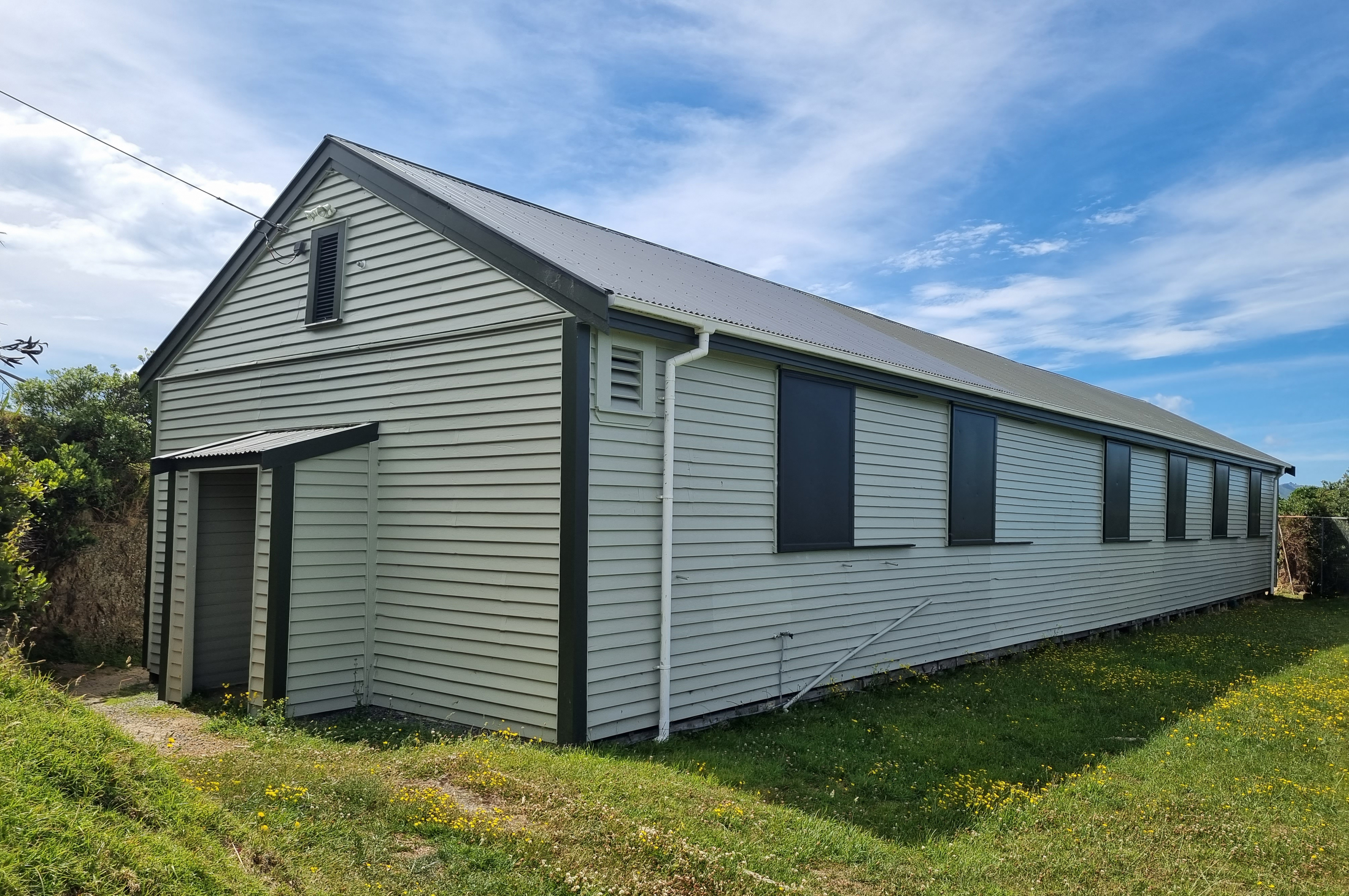
The Long Hall

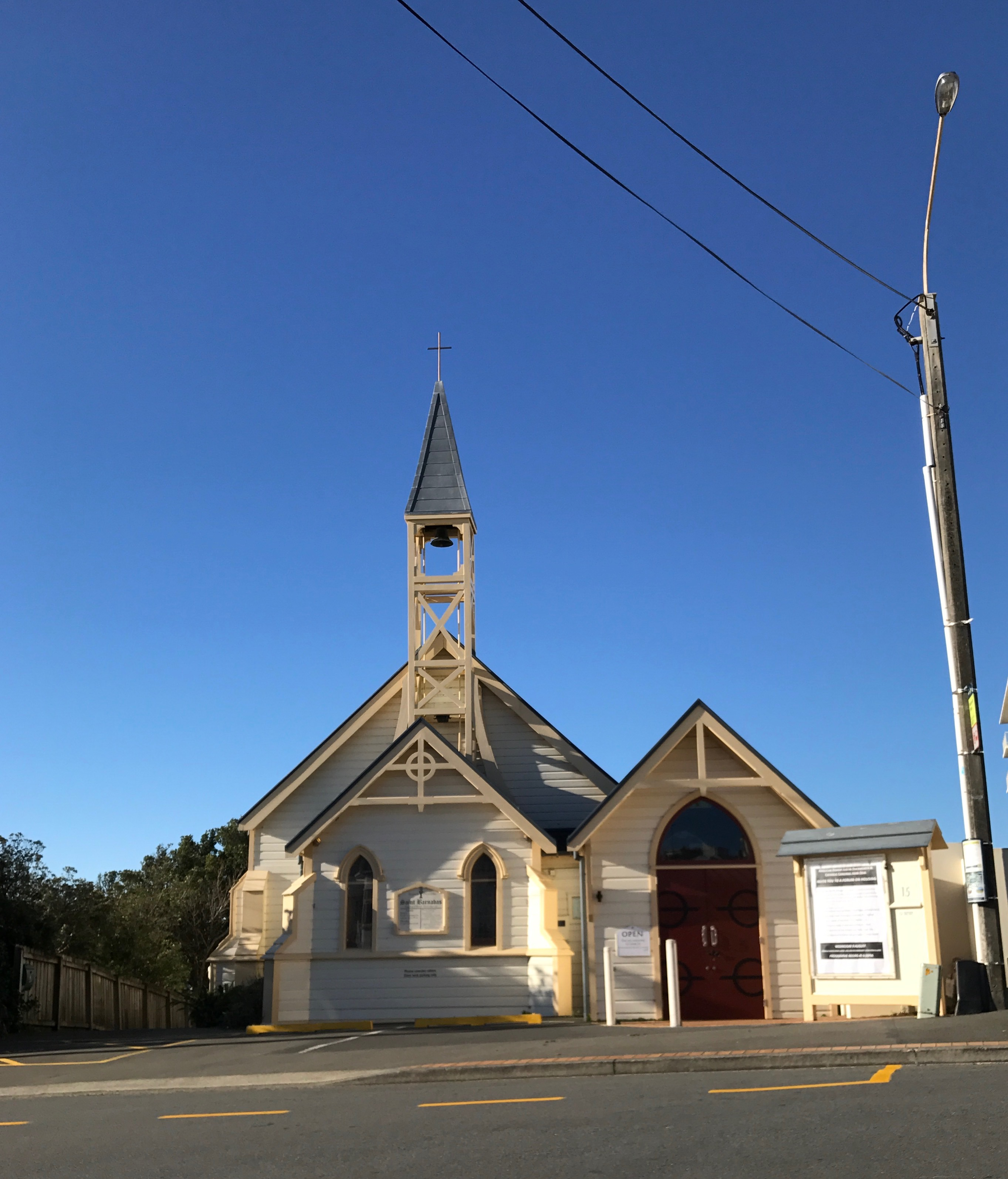
St Barnabas church

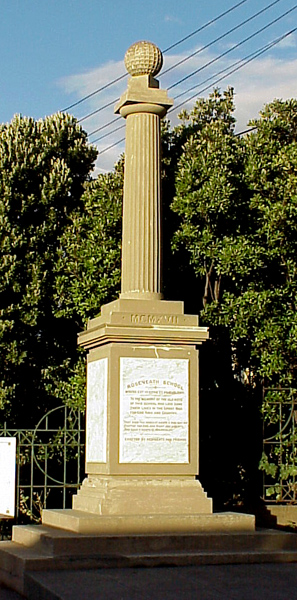
War memorial

== War Memorial ==
The war memorial at the local school commemorates former pupils who died in World War I. The memorial was unveiled by the Governor-General, the Earl of Liverpool, on 10 November 1917, almost exactly one year before the war was over. At the time of unveiling, which was attended by the Mayor of Wellington, John Luke and the Prime Minister, William Massey, the memorial included the names of five soldiers killed in battle. By the end of the war, there were 13 names on the memorial.

== Demographics ==
Historical population
Year	Pop.	±% p.a.
2006	1,692	—
2013	1,731	+0.33%
2018	1,788	+0.65%
2023	1,734	−0.61%

Roseneath statistical area covers 0.55 km^{2} (0.21 sq mi). It had an estimated population of 1,730 as of June 2025, with a population density of 3,145 people per km^{2}.

Roseneath had a population of 1,734 in the 2023 New Zealand census, a decrease of 54 people (−3.0%) since the 2018 census, and an increase of 3 people (0.2%) since the 2013 census. There were 852 males, 864 females, and 21 people of other genders in 744 dwellings. 11.6% of people identified as LGBTIQ+. The median age was 37.5 years (compared with 38.1 years nationally). There were 147 people (8.5%) aged under 15 years, 456 (26.3%) aged 15 to 29, 867 (50.0%) aged 30 to 64, and 264 (15.2%) aged 65 or older.

People could identify as more than one ethnicity. The results were 87.9% European (Pākehā); 7.6% Māori; 1.9% Pasifika; 9.7% Asian; 4.0% Middle Eastern, Latin American and African New Zealanders (MELAA); and 1.2% other, which includes people giving their ethnicity as "New Zealander". English was spoken by 98.4%, Māori by 2.2%, Samoan by 0.2%, and other languages by 21.1%. No language could be spoken by 1.0% (e.g. too young to talk). New Zealand Sign Language was known by 0.3%. The percentage of people born overseas was 33.0, compared with 28.8% nationally.

Religious affiliations were 22.5% Christian, 1.0% Hindu, 0.7% Islam, 0.5% Māori religious beliefs, 1.0% Buddhist, 0.7% New Age, 1.0% Jewish, and 2.2% other religions. People who answered that they had no religion were 65.4%, and 5.2% of people did not answer the census question.

Of those at least 15 years old, 993 (62.6%) people had a bachelor's or higher degree, 444 (28.0%) had a post-high school certificate or diploma, and 153 (9.6%) people exclusively held high school qualifications. The median income was $72,400, compared with $41,500 nationally. 537 people (33.8%) earned over $100,000 compared to 12.1% nationally. The employment status of those at least 15 was 1,005 (63.3%) full-time, 225 (14.2%) part-time, and 42 (2.6%) unemployed.

== Education ==
Roseneath School is a co-educational state primary school for Year 1 to 8 students. It opened in 1898 because Clyde Quay School had become overcrowded. It has a roll of 84 as of October 2025.
