= Steven King (journalist) =

Journalist and political commentator

Steven King is a political commentator and public relations consultant and the former chief political advisor to Nobel laureate David Trimble.

== Early life and education ==
King graduated with a First Class degree in Political Science from Oxford University, subsequently completing a Master of Social Science in Humanities degree at the University of Ulster and a Doctor of Philosophy degree from The Queen's University of Belfast (his PhD thesis focused on Irish constitutional republicanism/Charles Haughey).

== Ulster Unionist advisor ==
King served as political advisor to Nobel Peace Laureate and First Minister of Northern Ireland David Trimble between 1998 and 2004. He was the Ulster Unionist Party negotiator on equality, human rights and cultural issues in the multi-party talks leading to the Good Friday Agreement. At Stormont, he was responsible for political communication strategies, party management issues and drafting position papers. He was also Lord Trimble’s main speechwriter.

== Public relations ==
In 1996, King began writing a weekly column for the Belfast Telegraph, before transferring to the Irish Examiner in 2005, before resigning in 2011 over claims that he had plagiarised content. He left formal politics in 2005 to work in public relations, initially assuming responsibility for dealing with the reputational issues arising from the Office of Fair Trading inquiry into alleged fee-fixing for the Independent Schools Council, before becoming External Relations Director for Policy Exchange a centre-right think-tank, between 2006 and 2008, then, latterly, as a director of APCO Worldwide between 2008 and 2012, the global public affairs and communications firm.

== Personal life ==
King's marriage, in 2005, to Jean-Claude Madrange was publicly denounced by the DUP politician Ian Paisley Jr

In August 2010, an inquest at St Pancras Court in London found that King's partner, Jean-Claude Madrange, had taken his own life on 8 May. St Pancras Court was told that Mr Madrange was struggling with bipolar disorder and had tried to commit suicide by taking an overdose one month earlier.

In June 2012, the BBC reported that King was critically ill in a hospital in Delhi, India. Six weeks later, the BBC reported that King remained critically ill in intensive care in Delhi. King was transferred to the UK where he spent nearly 18 months in critical care, before recovering in rehabilitation.
