= Oriental Bay =

Suburb of Wellington City, New Zealand

- Suburb
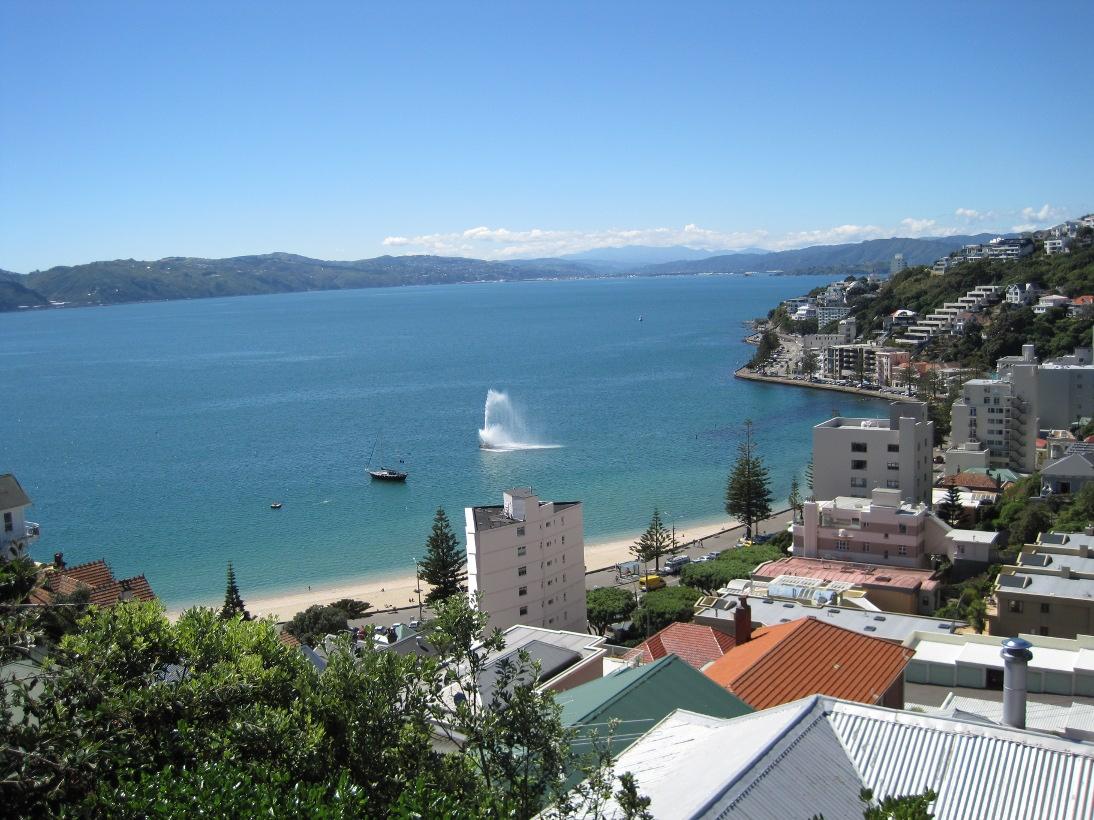
- Oriental Bay, the Tararuas in the far distance
- Interactive map of Oriental Bay
- Coordinates: 41°17′30″S 174°47′40″E
- Country: New Zealand
- City: Wellington City
- Local authority: Wellington City Council
- Electoral ward: Pukehīnau/Lambton Ward; Te Whanganui-a-Tara Māori Ward

Area
  - Land: 30 ha (74 acres)

Population (June 2025)
  - Total: 1,360
  - Density: 4,500/km^{2} (12,000/sq mi)

	Wellington Harbour
Mount Victoria and Te Aro	Oriental Bay	Roseneath
	Wellington Town Belt

Oriental Bay is a bay and suburb of Wellington, the capital city of New Zealand. Known for being both a popular beach and an opulent centre of affluence in the city, it is located close to the central business district on Wellington Harbour.

It has the closest beach to the central city and is thus a popular destination for locals, who swarm here especially in the warmer months (December to March). Painted ladies and other historic houses, such as those in distinctly Wellingtonian streamline moderne style, are prominent alongside and up into the hills that face the bay. Situated against the northern slope of Mount Victoria, the suburb lies 1.5 kilometres (0.93 miles) southeast of the city centre, at the start of a coastal route which continues around into Evans Bay. Oriental Bay was originally named Duppa Bay, after its sole original resident George Duppa, but in 1843 he renamed it after the Oriental, one of the first ships to bring settlers to Wellington. Originally described as a remote "dreary-looking spot" of rocks lying between cliffs and the sea used primarily for quarantining foreigners, it has undergone considerable changes since the early stages of European settlement.

Many landmarks were built during the 20th century, including grand streamlined moderne houses like the Olympus Building and the Anscombe Apartments, and the modernist Freyberg Pool built in the 1960s. However, the beach's greatest renovation came in 2004, when 22,000 tonnes of sand was shipped from Golden Bay to rebuild the beach, which had become worn down over many years.

The Carter Fountain is a distinctive feature in the bay, as is a wooden pontoon which is often covered in swimmers. A small section of the bay that lies beside Freyberg Pool is known as Freyberg Beach, after Lord Freyberg.

== History ==
=== 19th century ===
Oriental Bay was originally known as Duppa Bay, after the first and only resident at the time, George Duppa, who later renamed the area Oriental Bay after the ship that he arrived in New Zealand on in 1840. The area was originally farm land and was used as a quarantine station with a nurse and tent on the beach, and by whalers, which resulted in a pungent odour from the boiled whale blubber.

David Wilkinson from Ayrshire, Scotland, was an early Wellington resident and gardener who lived at Grass Street, Oriental Bay in a house named Roseneath Cottage. He opened Wilkinson's Tea Gardens at the bay in 1850. The tea gardens was a fashionable place to visit for many years until it closed in the early 20th century. Visitors would walk along the waterfront to enjoy tea and music in the tea rooms, wander around the garden and take away a posy of flowers. The 'Roseneath Estate' began to be developed in 1886 and probably took its name from Wilkinson's business. Walking access from Oriental Bay to Roseneath begins at the top of Grass Street outside Wilkinson's house, now 13 Grass Street, at the foot of Wilkinson Street.

Wilkinson also grew grapes commercially and operated a plant nursery, until at least 1891. Wilkinson died in 1902 but his son was still growing grapes in hothouses at Oriental Bay in 1913. Wilkinson junior died in 1919 and the tea garden property was divided up for housing in 1923.

The first public baths at Oriental Bay was an open-air saltwater pool opened in 1864 where the Clyde Quay boat harbour is now. The baths was operated for many years by Henry and Matilda Meech, and known as Te Aro Baths, Clyde Quay Baths or Meech's Baths. The original pool was 130 ft by 72 ft, but it was enlarged in 1877. An 1897 description stated that "the baths are securely protected from the visits of sea monsters". Around the pool there were 34 dressing rooms and rooms for refreshments.

From the 1870s a quarry existed near the base of Carlton Gore Road. A temporary railway line was built in the 1880s to take spoil from the quarry for the Te Aro reclamation. The former quarry was developed into a small park in the early 1900s.

Settlement of the area increased in the 1880s and residents and landowners began petitioning Wellington Harbour Board and Wellington City Council, asking that the bay not be used for industrial purposes such as ship repairs, that the road be improved and a promenade built, and that the bay should be kept clean of all the refuse and dead animals that swept up along the waterfront.

=== 20th century ===
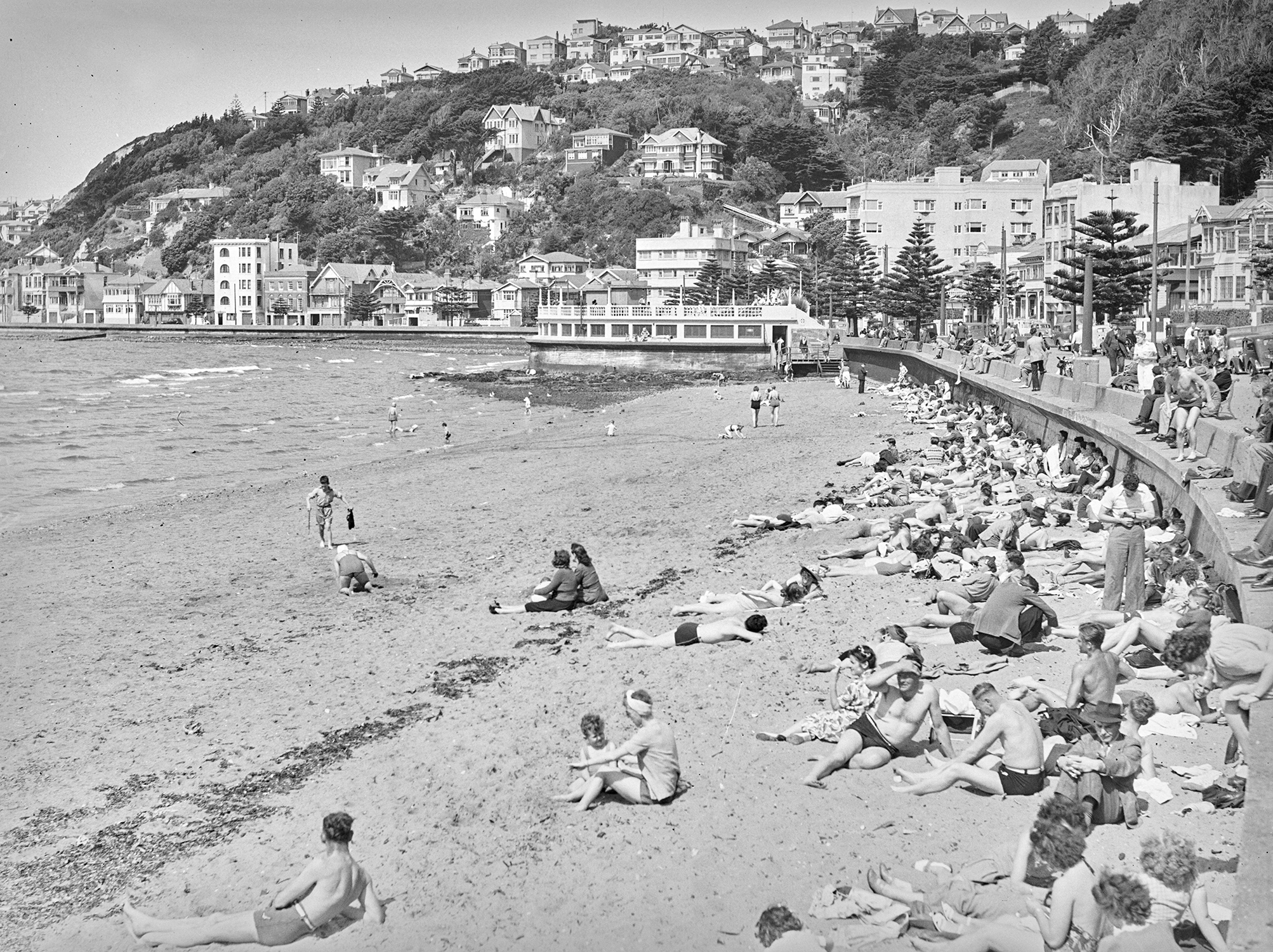
Beach bathing, Oriental Bay, Wellington, January, 1947

Public amenities developed further in the early 1900s included public transport, improvements to Te Aro baths, road improvements, construction of the promenade, installation of the band rotunda, opening of a tea kiosk, and planting of trees.

In 1901 Meech's Baths were demolished and Wellington City Council built new public baths with men's and women's sections, known as Te Aro Baths, further along the waterfront at the site of today's Freyberg Pool. The baths were enlarged in 1909. Schools held swimming lessons at the baths, and swimming competitions took place there too. By the 1960s the baths were in disrepair: in 1962 a storm carried away a section of the wall and dressing rooms. The baths were replaced by Freyberg Pool, which opened in 1963.

Trams began running along Oriental Parade in September 1904. They were replaced by buses in 1950.

In 1911, Wellington City Council began building a sea wall along Oriental Bay from the Te Aro Baths to Point Jerningham. The work was done in stages as funding allowed, and was completed as far as the tea kiosk at Point Jerningham by 1924. Gaps behind the sea wall were filled in and a promenade created. The sea wall is heritage-listed by Wellington City Council.

Construction of the sea wall decreased the size of the rocky beach, and there were calls for sand to be brought in to enlarge and improve the area. A big boost to the beach came during World War 2, when ships from England brought sand as ballast which was then dumped at Oriental Bay. Almost 20,000 tons of sand was deposited on the beach during 1944–1945.

The Oriental Bay Tea Kiosk opened in April 1913 on the site of a former quarry and industrial store at what is now 370 Oriental Bay, at the base of Carlton Gore Road. The ground floor held a large tea rooms and on the second storey was a dance hall with a sprung floor and glassed-in balcony around it. In 1916 dancing had "gone out of fashion" so the upper level was converted into a 31-room private hotel. From about 1921 until the 1940s the building became the Oriental Private Hotel (or Orient Private Hotel). From then until 1957 the building was a YWCA hostel, and from 1957 it was a Labour Department hostel for civil servants, especially young people newly arrived in Wellington for training courses or new careers. Around 1980 the building was demolished and replaced by a Park Royal hotel, which became Raffaele Hotel and was then sold in 2003 and converted into apartments.

The Carter Fountain was installed in the bay in 1973.

Taxi drivers commonly used their own slang to refer to Oriental Bay as "China Bay".

In December 1983 a large festival called 'The Sun Festival' took place at Oriental Bay as part of the Summer City (Wellington) festivities. A reported 80,000 people participated and attended. There was a procession along the promenade which had been colourfully painted by local high schools, and a procession of rafts encircled the Carter Fountain followed by fireworks and music.

=== 21st century ===
In the early 2000s Freyberg Beach, the area of Oriental Bay next to Freyberg Pool, was redeveloped in a project costing $7.5 million. A grassed picnic area was enlarged, sand was brought in to extend the beach, and a pier, toilet block and multi-level sea platform were built. The project was awarded the George Malcolm Supreme Award in the Rural/Park/Recreational category of the New Zealand Institute of Landscape Architects in 2004. 22,000 tonnes of sand from Wainui Bay in Golden Bay was brought in to expand both Oriental and Freyberg Beach. Wind and waves cause the sand to shift, so twice a year Wellington City Council moves the sand around to maintain the beaches. In 2019 this was stated to cost about $70,000 per year. The sand needs to be topped up every ten to twelve years, so in 2015 the Council imported 2400 tonnes of sand from Dunedin. The sand at Oriental Bay is quite coarse-grained, to minimise loss to wind. Special soft sand is brought in for volleyball matches.

Oriental Bay is a site for topless sunbathing. In December 2016, a Free The Nipple Beach Day was held there.

Oriental Parade has been used for cycling and running races on a course around the coast since the nineteenth century. The Round the Bays fun run has taken place since the 1970s and is the third-largest mass-participation event in New Zealand. Runners and walkers begin in the CBD, usually at Frank Kitts Park, and travel around the coastline, along Oriental Bay and around past Evans Bay to Kilbirnie. More than 10,000 people took part in 2023.

== Points of interest ==
=== Norfolk pines ===
Norfolk pines are a distinctive feature of the promenade along Oriental Bay. The first seedlings were planted in 1921, and planting continued for several years. The mature trees, some up to 15 m tall, line most of Oriental Parade and are listed as heritage trees by Wellington City Council. In 2017 there were fears that kākā were damaging the trees. Many of the trees are illuminated at night with strings of lights along their branches.

=== St Gerard's church and monastery ===
St Gerard's is a brick church and monastery built on a promontory (Fitzgerald Point) overlooking Oriental Bay. The church was built in 1908 and the monastery in 1932. Together they form a distinctive landmark above the bay.

=== Band rotunda ===
The Oriental Bay Band Rotunda is a heritage-listed structure located in the middle of Oriental Bay. It was built in 1936 to replace an earlier wooden band rotunda and originally was a one-storey pavilion with changing rooms for swimmers and an open-air viewing platform. A second storey was added in 1985 that became a restaurant. The basement was closed in 2012 because of earthquake risk, and the 2016 Kaikōura earthquake caused damage that led to closure of the restaurant level. Redevelopment of the building was proposed on several occasions, but in December 2024, Wellington City Council announced that it would be redeveloped as the "Wellington Pavilion", including a restaurant and bar, and retaining public access to the top level.

=== Carter Fountain ===
The Carter Fountain was donated to the city in 1973 by local businessman Hugh Carter, in memory of his parents. The fountain spouts water 16 metres (52 ft) into the air, and is illuminated at night. The band rotunda holds the land-based electrical components for the fountain. During events such as arts festivals, images have been projected onto the spray from the fountain.

=== Freyberg Pool ===
Freyberg Pool is an indoor public swimming pool built out into Oriental Bay. It was opened in 1963 near the site of the former Te Aro Baths, an outdoor saltwater pool. Freyberg Pool is named after Bernard Freyberg, a former governor-general of New Zealand. Freyberg was a keen swimmer and had trained at the Te Aro Baths. He died in 1963 so the new pool was named after him. The building is classified as a "Category I" ("places of 'special or outstanding historical or cultural heritage significance or value'") historic place by Heritage New Zealand.

=== Tug boat restaurant ===
A former tug boat is permanently moored in the lagoon next to Freyberg Pool. The ship, originally called Aucklander, was built in Scotland in 1958 and served as a tug boat in Auckland until 1986. It was sold and brought to Wellington in October 1986. The engines and other parts were removed and after refurbishment the tug was renamed Tapuhi II and moved to Oriental Bay where it opened as a restaurant and function centre in February 1992. The business was initially known as Tugboat on the Bay, and later Skippers Seafood Restaurant, then Boat Cafe.

=== Heritage-listed buildings ===
Apart from the band rotunda, Oriental Bay is the location of several other heritage-listed buildings:

- Tram Shelter (Former) built in 1904
- Anscombe Flats, an art deco apartment block
- Apartment building at 300 Oriental Parade
- Inverleith Flats, an apartment building at 306 Oriental Parade

=== Wishing well ===
A tiled wishing well opposite the beach at Oriental Bay was built by members of Wellington Jaycees in 1960. The well was designed by local resident Belinda Reburn, and the tiles featuring wildlife including fish, crabs, starfish, sea snails, shells and seagulls were made by Neville Porteous, with some of them being painted by Helene Carroll. A plaque beside the well shows a quotation by Shakespeare: "Sweet health and fair desires/Consort your grace,/Thy own wish—wish I thee/In every place". The well was refurbished in 1996.

== Demographics ==
Oriental Bay statistical area covers 0.30 km^{2} (0.12 sq mi). It had an estimated population of 1,360 as of June 2025, with a population density of 4,533 people per km^{2}.

Historical population
Year	Pop.	±% p.a.
2006	1,428	—
2013	1,383	−0.46%
2018	1,389	+0.09%
2023	1,350	−0.57%

Oriental Bay had a population of 1,350 in the 2023 New Zealand census, a decrease of 39 people (−2.8%) since the 2018 census, and a decrease of 33 people (−2.4%) since the 2013 census. There were 624 males, 705 females, and 18 people of other genders in 675 dwellings. 9.6% of people identified as LGBTIQ+. The median age was 51.6 years (compared with 38.1 years nationally). There were 69 people (5.1%) aged under 15 years, 291 (21.6%) aged 15 to 29, 552 (40.9%) aged 30 to 64, and 432 (32.0%) aged 65 or older.

People could identify as more than one ethnicity. The results were 84.7% European (Pākehā); 6.4% Māori; 1.3% Pasifika; 11.3% Asian; 3.6% Middle Eastern, Latin American and African New Zealanders (MELAA); and 2.4% other, which includes people giving their ethnicity as "New Zealander". English was spoken by 98.4%, Māori by 2.2%, Samoan by 0.2%, and other languages by 22.0%. No language could be spoken by 0.7% (e.g. too young to talk). The percentage of people born overseas was 32.9, compared with 28.8% nationally.

Religious affiliations were 33.3% Christian, 2.7% Hindu, 0.9% Islam, 0.2% Māori religious beliefs, 0.4% Buddhist, 0.4% New Age, 1.3% Jewish, and 1.3% other religions. People who answered that they had no religion were 54.0%, and 5.6% of people did not answer the census question.

Of those at least 15 years old, 756 (59.0%) people had a bachelor's or higher degree, 396 (30.9%) had a post-high school certificate or diploma, and 132 (10.3%) people exclusively held high school qualifications. The median income was $67,900, compared with $41,500 nationally. 426 people (33.3%) earned over $100,000 compared to 12.1% nationally. The employment status of those at least 15 was 660 (51.5%) full-time, 168 (13.1%) part-time, and 24 (1.9%) unemployed.

== Gallery ==
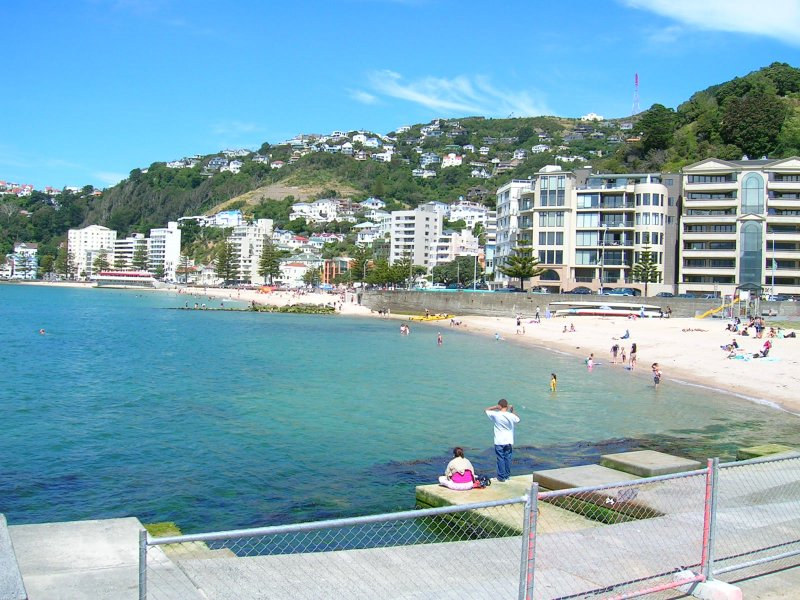
Beach at Oriental Bay

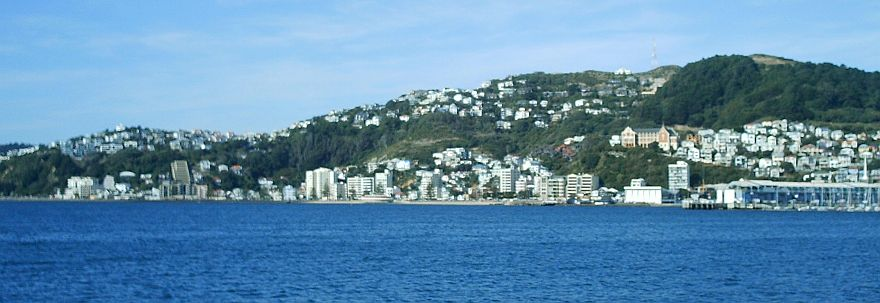
Oriental Bay as seen from the city at Queens Wharf

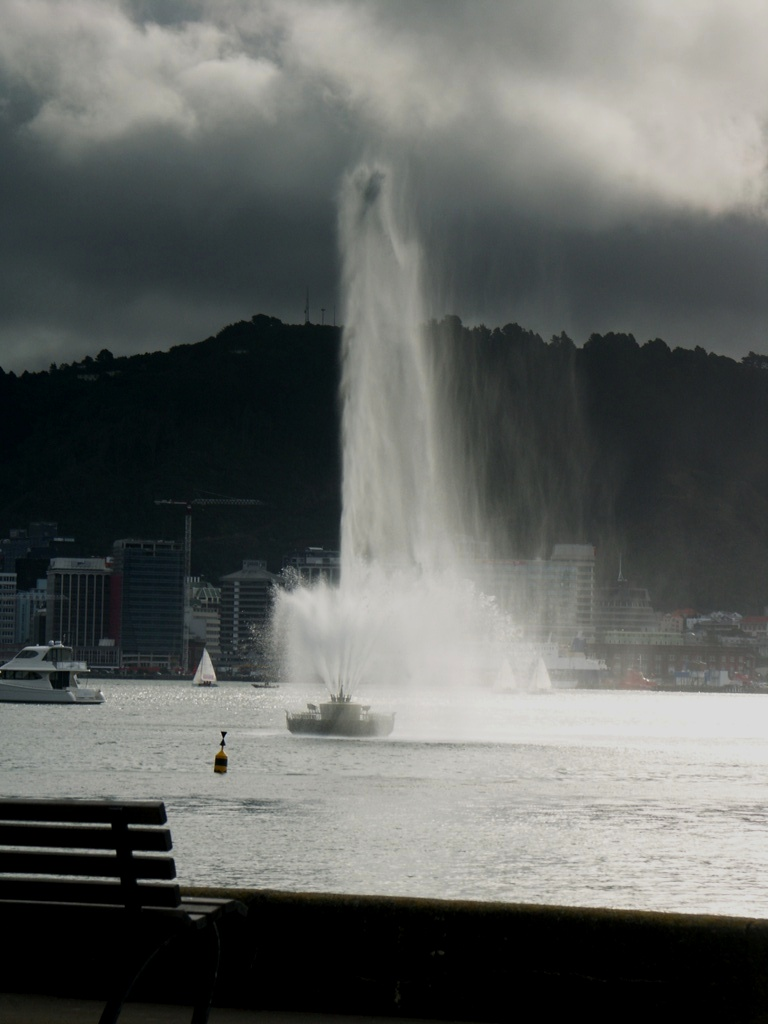
Carter Fountain

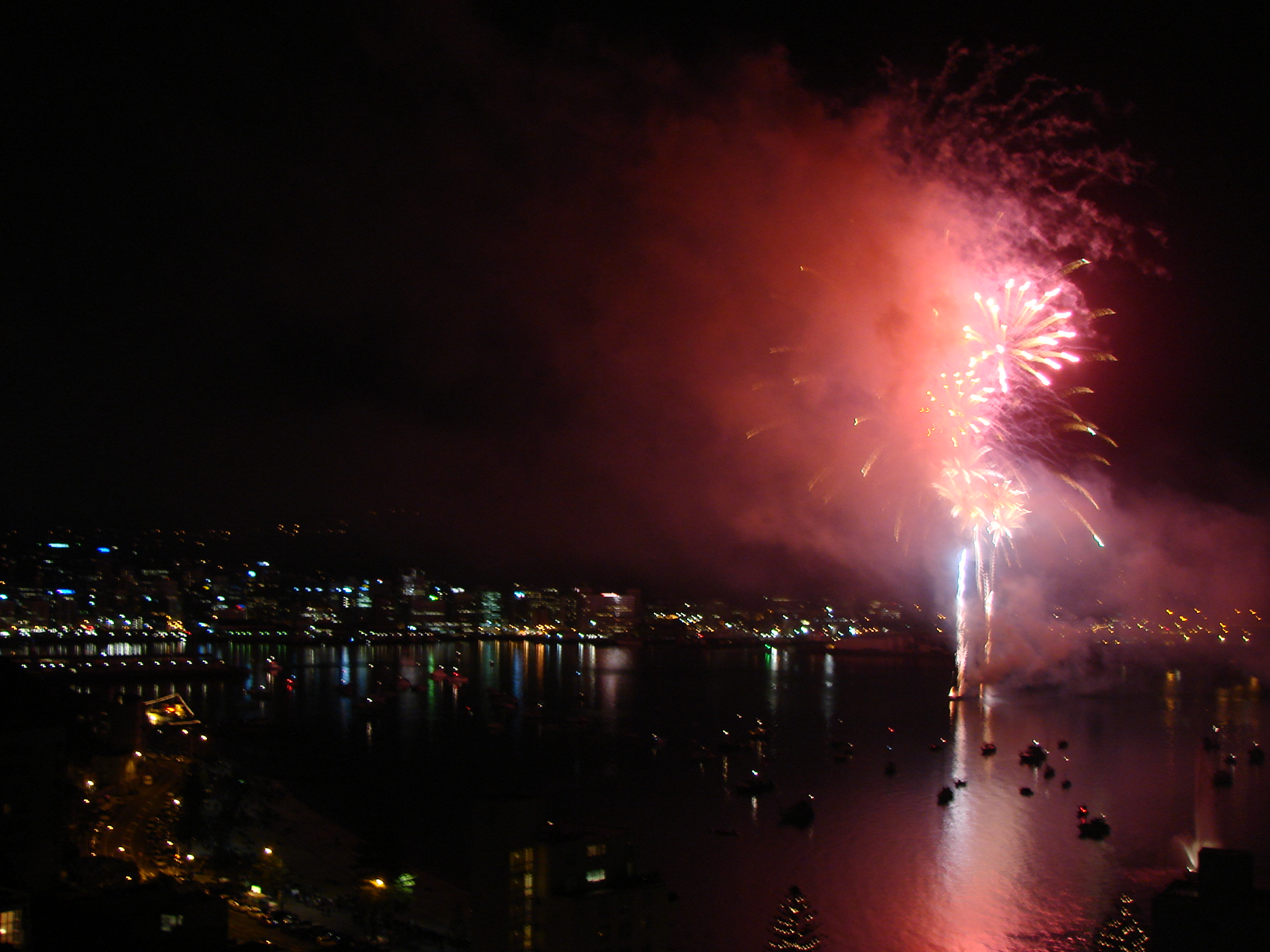
Fireworks in Oriental Bay

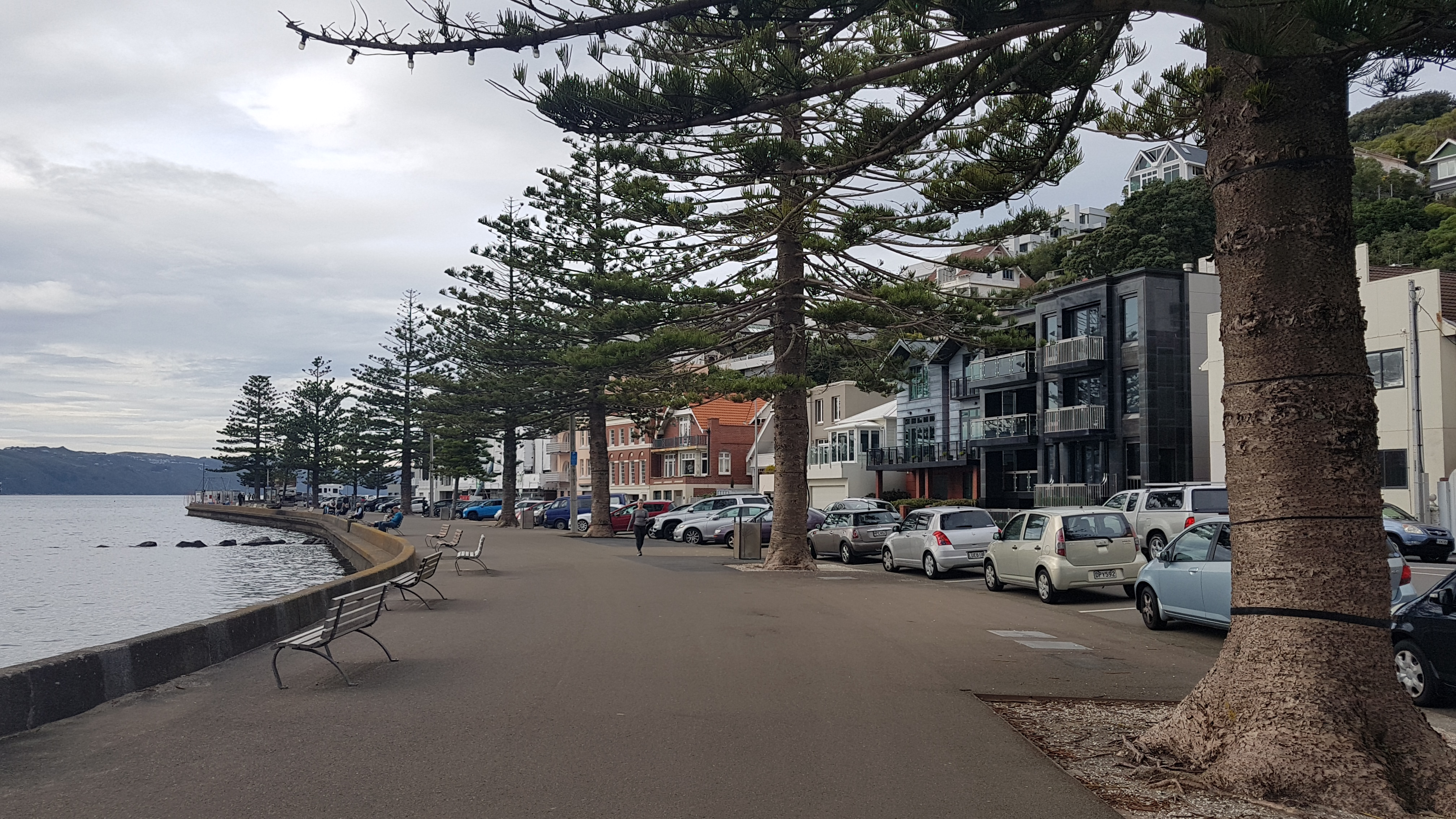
Norfolk Pines along Oriental Parade, 2021.
