= Greek New Zealanders =

Ελληνοζηλανδοί

Total population
- Greek ethnic group 2,478 (March 2013) Descent Approx. 10,000

Regions with significant populations
- Wellington, Christchurch, Auckland

Languages
- New Zealand English, Greek

Religion
- Predominantly Greek Orthodox,

Related ethnic groups
- Greek Australians and other Greek diaspora groups

Greek New Zealanders (Greek: Ελληνοζηλανδοί, Ellinozilandoí) are New Zealand citizens and residents who are of full or partial Greek ancestry; either those who immigrated to or were born in New Zealand. Large concentrations of the community are to be found in Wellington, and to a lesser extent Christchurch and Auckland. Smaller communities of Greeks reside in Palmerston North, Wanganui, Dunedin, Hamilton, Nelson and Napier. Many Greek New Zealanders maintain their Greek identity through the observation of Greek customs and traditions, and their adherence to their Greek Orthodox (Christian) faith, whilst also assimilating into New Zealand society.

The number of people reporting their ethnicity as Greek in New Zealand was 2,478 in the March 2013 census. An estimated 10,000 New Zealanders have Greek Ancestry.

In the modern era, many Greeks came by way of Australia to New Zealand, coming in waves during the 1950s and 60s. The vast majority of these migrants came to Wellington. Suburbs that became Greek strongholds include Mount Victoria, Strathmore Park, Miramar, Island Bay, Moera, Plimmerton, and Berhampore. Berhampore is where the local Greek football team, Wellington Olympic AFC, is based. Wellington Olympic is one of many local clubs formed by European immigrants during the 20th century.

As per the 2018 census, 2,475 New Zealanders identified themselves as Greeks, with 39.3% declaring solely with the Greek ethnicity.

== Migration ==
The vast majority of the Greeks immigrating to New Zealand came from the western prefecture of Aetolia-Acarnania, the Ionian Sea islands of Ithaca and Kephalonia, and from the island of Lesbos which is located in the northeastern Aegean Sea. Smaller numbers have come from Macedonia, Epirus, Attica, the Peloponnese, Crete, Romania and Cyprus. Chain migration has been popular.

=== The first Greek immigrants ===
It is believed that the first Greek in New Zealand was a Mr Constas, an officer in the merchant navy from Sparta, Laconia, which is situated in the southeastern part of the Peloponnese peninsula. He arrived in New Zealand in 1798 aboard a Dutch-flagged merchant ship, which later sank in Dunedin. He died in Dunedin in 1840 – the year the Treaty of Waitangi was signed.

In 1832, Captain Economou arrived in New Zealand on a Dutch or British ship. He stayed in New Zealand and married a Māori woman. He assisted his father-in-law at the Treaty of Waitangi.

Seaman Nicolas Demetriou Mangos from Syros arrived in New Zealand in 1844. He was 17 years old and jumped ship because his Dutch captain was reportedly cruel. He was sheltered by an Irish family, and later he married their daughter.

The earliest Greek presence recorded in the New Zealand census was in 1874, when forty men and one woman were reported. Nikolas Fernandos (or Mantzaris) from the island of Ithaca is considered the first known immigrant to New Zealand. Between 1890 and 1914, Greek immigrants established themselves as fishermen, street hawkers, confectioners, and restaurateurs in Wellington, Auckland, and Dunedin. Relatives of these early immigrants were encouraged to join them in New Zealand, setting up chain migration from poverty-stricken towns and villages. By 1936 there were 82 Greece born people living in Wellington with other immigrants residing in New Plymouth, Feilding, Palmerston North, Dannevirke, Napier, Hastings, Ashburton, Temuka, Timaru, Waimate and Oamaru.

=== War refugees ===
Greeks immigrated to New Zealand for a better life following World War II and the Greek Civil War, fought from 1946 to 1949. New Zealand, a member of the International Refugee Organization, assisted 1026 ethnic Greeks from Romania to settle in NZ in 1951. The displaced persons arrived in Wellington in May, August, and December 1951 on the SS GOYA from Piraeus, Greece. Although most arrivals were placed in jobs in Wellington, some were sent around the country to work in hydroelectric construction and heavy industry, where there was a shortage of labour. A commemorative plaque was unveiled on the Wellington waterfront in 2012, close to where the SS GOYA docked in 1951.

John Vakidis' acclaimed New Zealand play 'Tzigane' explores the Greek-Romanian refugee experience of emigrating and living in New Zealand.

=== The "Golden Age" ===
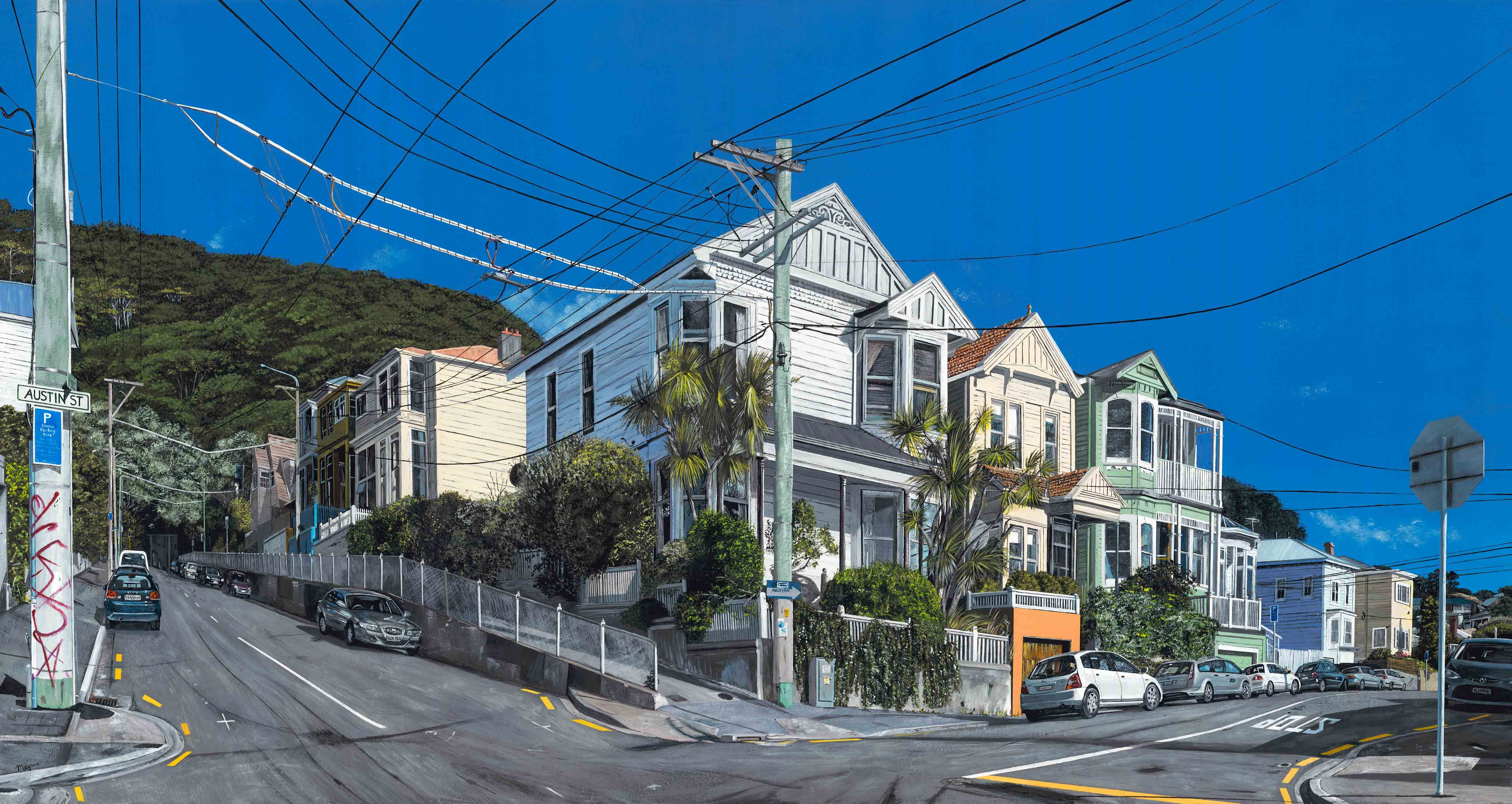
Mount Victoria, a Greek stronghold in Wellington.

A big influx of Greek immigration took place in the 1950s and 1960s due to economic and political problems in Greece. More than seven million Greeks emigrated from Greece during this period, mainly to the United States, Australia, Germany, the United Kingdom, Canada, Argentina, Brazil, and New Zealand. Amongst those immigrating to New Zealand during this period were 267 young women who arrived between 1962 and 1964 through a New Zealand government scheme to provide domestic staff for hospitals, schools, and hotels. The New Zealand Greek community's population peaked in the mid-1960s, with an estimated 5000–6000 Greeks, including New Zealand-born descendants.

=== Greek Cypriots ===
Most Greek Cypriots arrived in the late 1930s and after WWII between 1948 and 1960. Some Greek Cypriot refugees displaced from the Turkish-occupied areas of Cyprus arrived following the Turkish invasion of Cyprus in 1974. Greek Cypriots have their own community hall and community association, but are full and active members of the Greek Community.

=== Recent arrivals ===
Just under 100 Greeks have been granted New Zealand residency in the last 17 years. After 2010, due to the economic crisis in Greece there is a new migratory flow of Greeks to New Zealand.

=== Dual citizenship ===
Several Greek New Zealanders hold both New Zealand and Greek passports. Greek citizenship is acquired by birth by all persons born in Greece, and all persons born with at least one parent who is a registered Greek citizen. Any person who is ethnically Greek born outside Greece may become a Greek citizen through naturalization, providing they can prove a parent or grandparent was born as a national of Greece.

== Greek communities ==
The largest concentration of Greek people resides in the country's capital city, Wellington. It is estimated that 65 percent of all Greek New Zealanders live there. The inner-city suburb of Mount Victoria developed a distinct Greek character after World War II as Greek immigrants clustered together for community support. Today, the eastern suburb of Miramar is the city's main Greek enclave, with significant numbers also residing in Hataitai and Seatoun. The Greek Orthodox Archdiocese and the Embassy of Greece are both located in Wellington.

Smaller communities exist in Christchurch, Auckland, and Napier/Hastings. Greek Orthodox churches exist in all these centres.

Many Greek New Zealanders enjoy the riches of two cultures – maintaining Greek cultural customs whilst integrating into the Kiwi way of life.

It has been estimated that about 50 percent of marriages of Greek persons are now mixed. It is common for the wedding to take place in the Greek Orthodox Church with the non-Greek non-Christian partner becoming baptised before the marriage.

=== Employment ===
Many Greek immigrants established food businesses such as restaurants, grill-rooms and fish and chips shops. Zisis Blades' book Wellington's Hellenic Mile: The Greek Shops of Twentieth Century Wellington documents the many Greek shops of 20th century Wellington. Today many Greeks are tertiary educated – professionals, public servants, tradespeople and business owners.

=== The Greek Orthodox Church ===
The Greek Orthodox faith plays a central part in the cultural life of many Greek New Zealanders. From 1924 New Zealand was part of the Greek Orthodox Archdiocese of Australia and New Zealand. Until the 1940s when a church was built in Wellington, the all-important sacraments of baptism and marriage could only be performed when a priest visited from Australia. In 1970, New Zealand became a separate diocese with its own archbishop. The distinctive Byzantine-syle domed Greek Orthodox Church – The Annunciation of the Virgin Mary on Hania Street (formerly Lloyd Street) in Mount Victoria, Wellington was consecrated in 1970 by Metropolitan Dionysios Psiachas (dec), the first Archbishop of the Holy Metropolis of New Zealand. The current Metropolitan of New Zealand, Bishop Erithron Amfilochios Tsoukos was elected in 2005 and elevated the church on Hania Street to cathedral status. The Holy Greek Orthodox Archdiocese of New Zealand oversees ten churches in New Zealand including the Holy Archangels Monastery which was built in 2009, east of Levin.

=== Greek organisations ===
The Panhellenic Club on Marion Street in Wellingtom was the first Greek club, established in 1927. It then moved to Wakefield Street.

Today the largest and most active organisation is the Greek Orthodox Community of Wellington and Suburbs. The incorporated society, established in 1945, is governed by an elected executive which manages the Greek Community Centre on Hania Street in Mount Victoria, Wellington. The Community Centre consists of The Greek Orthodox Cathedral – The Annunciation of the Virgin Mary, the Parthenon Building which houses a functions hall and classrooms, and an adjacent apartment building with meeting rooms. Other cities and regions have active community associations as well, namely, Christchurch, Auckland, the Hutt Valley and Palmerston North.

Greek organisations representing different regional or national sub-groups have helped sustain the culture. In Wellington there are a number of associations whose membership is based on regional origin: namely Macedonia, Crete, Ithaca, Lesbos and Alto-akarnania.

The Hellenic New Zealand Congress was formed in 1994 with the aim to foster better understanding, goodwill and friendly relations between the Hellenic communities and all New Zealanders through the support and promotion of Greek culture, traditions, history and language. Membership is welcomed from all Greeks and New Zealanders.

=== Greek language ===
A 1990 study by Maria Verivaki of Greek language ability amongst Greek New Zealanders found that more than half of the community claimed a high level of ability for understanding and speaking Greek with the order of proficiency being: understanding, speaking, reading, writing. There was a decreasing proficiency across each succeeding generation across the four language skills. The study also found a higher level of proficiency for those who visited Greece, attended church or attended Greek language school. The study concluded that exposure to the Greek language seems to be the key to language maintenance in the Greek community of New Zealand.

The Greek Orthodox Community of Wellington has been providing Greek language lessons for children for over 50 years, and more recently for teenagers and adults. The Greek Government generously provides a qualified teacher from Greece, who teaches alongside local Greek people at the Greek community school. Many Greek New Zealanders have installed cable television in their homes, with which they can receive Greek-language news and entertainment channels, in this way strengthening their Greek language skills.

=== Cultural activities ===
The different Greek communities, associations, clubs and families enjoy socialising by engaging in social activities that include Greek food and music. Non-Greek New Zealanders enjoy partaking and have come to appreciate the Greek culture through Greek Community organised cultural and fundraising events including:

- the commemoration of Greek National days on 25 March and 28 October, and the Battle of Crete in May;
- the annual Greek Food Festival in Wellington;
- art exhibitions by Greek New Zealand artists;
- dance performances;
- concerts by local Greek musicians and visiting Greek musicians: George Dalaras (1997), Glykeria (2000), Nana Mouskouri (Farewell Tour, 2005), Vangelis Perpiniadis (1999), Stathis Aggelopoulos and Stelios Perpiniadis (2014).

A Greek band has been operating in various guises in Wellington for the last thirty years. The bands have primarily performed at Gree19k functions in Wellington and across New Zealand. The first known amateur band operated in Wellington in the 1960s with members Taso Soulis (piano accordion) John Zaloumis (lead guitar), Jim Viatos (mandolin), Manoli Haldezos (rhythm guitar) and Gregory Koutopos (percussion) Which gave many nationalities including Yugoslavs Italians and Jewish community and also Greek various types of music which they played at the time, later in the 70s Robert Metohianakis joined the band as they gave the band A Modern Flavour in their repertoire months later George Metohianakis joined the band while one of the members went on a holiday back home. On his returned Taso Soulis decided They want him to stay on so the band became very popular because of the variety of different music played.

In the early 1980s George Metohianakis (lead vocal and bouzouki) Robert Metohianakis (bass) With Jeff Boulieris (drummer) carried on the Greek Band which was started by Taso Souli 'The Greek Band' The band then decided we will bring George Photiadis, Bruce Maniadis and Alex Theodorides the to make the band more versatile which Later released the albums (The Greek Way) (Yia tin Ayape For the Love). In 1985 George Metohianakis decided to move to Australia. Robert Metohianakis and Jeff Boulieris carried on the Greek band until Robert decided to move to Australia as well so the band dispersed

Two years later Mythos Band Came to life with some new blood helloreleased an album in 1987. Most recently the Children of Aphrodite founded by Andronicos Economous, who along with Alex Theodorides and Doros Kyriakides were performing together from 1977 in the Wellington Greek music scene' has performed at various functions.

Between 1987 and 1989, four Wellington Greeks, Bruce Magiannis, Dimitri Papadopoulos, Tasos Varelas and Costa Christie formed a group named MYTHOS and recorded two albums of original Greek songs penned by Magiannis and Papadopoulos. Although the songs are in Greek they have a contemporary western feel. The first album, With The Memory, reached No.37 on the album charts from which Air New Zealand chose to feature the track Monaxia on their in flight entertainment for almost two years. TVNZ used the video clip for this song as a filler between programmes for many months.

In 1996 singer Christina Daglas founded To Fos, a Greek music ensemble which, for the next ten years, performed and recorded with an eclectic mix of musicians. In 2001 Daglas released Christina Daglas: Folk Songs of Greece. This CD was very well received both in New Zealand and internationally and led to an invitation to sing at the Nanning International Folk Festival in China and the Beijing International Music Festival. Daglas was for a while a member of Greek Nights an ensemble that performs authentic Greek music and dance at various venues in Auckland.

John Psathas is one of a few New Zealand composers who have made a mark on the international scene, particularly in Europe and North America. He is widely considered one of the three most important living composers of the Greek Diaspora. Psathas' music has been commissioned and performed by many musicians and orchestras around the world including Michael Brecker, Dame Evelyn Glennie, Michael Houstoun, Joshua Redman, The New Zealand String Quartet, Federico Mondelci, the New Zealand Chamber Soloists, the New Zealand Trio, Pedro Carneiro, the Takacs Quartet, the Netherlands Blazers Ensemble, the Halle Orchestra, the Royal Philharmonic, the Melbourne Symphony, the BBC Scottish Symphony, the Auckland Philharmonia, the Vector Wellington Orchestra, and the New Zealand Symphony Orchestra. Psathas composed the ceremonial music for the 2004 Olympic Games.

=== Sport ===
A lack of recreational opportunities for Greek youth led Greek Orthodox priest Father Ilias Economou to establish the Olympic football club (formerly called the Christian Youth Football Club) in 1958. Today Wellington Olympic AFC fields an array of senior and junior teams. In 2009 the club's premier team won the Chatham Cup.

In the run-up to the 2004 Athens Olympics a number of successful cultural events were organized, with a substantial contribution from the Greek community. A number of Greek New Zealanders travelled to Greece to work as volunteers during the Games. Greek New Zealander John Psathas composed the music that was played at the Opening and Closing Ceremonies.

In 2009 the Greek community in New Zealand was represented at the Oceania Pan Hellenic Games in Melbourne by a small team of athletes. About 600 athletes of Greek descent from all over Australia and New Zealand competed in a range of sports.

=== Media ===
For many years Greeks have had to rely on newspapers and magazines sent by family in Greece/Australia or purchased when on holiday in Greece for Greek news or entertainment. The Wellington Greek community has enjoyed different locally produced non-commercial community newsletters, newspapers and magazines for news from Greece or of Greek relevance, and music and news on the weekly Greek Community, Hellenic Youth and Cypriot radio broadcasts on Wellington Access Radio 738 HzM, hosted by volunteers from the Greek community.

With the advent of the Internet and satellite television, Greek New Zealanders can access information and entertainment from their homes. ERT World, the international service run by ERT, Greece's public broadcaster and the privately owned Antenna are broadcast in New Zealand.

== Political voice ==
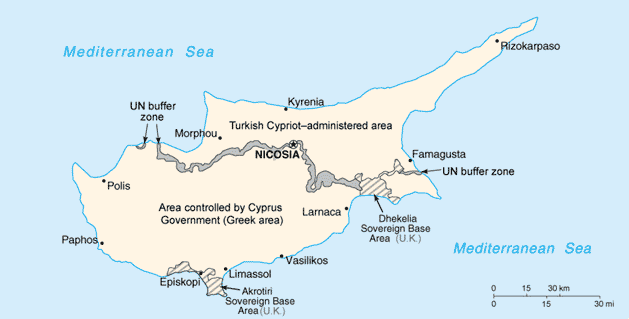
Map showing the current division of Cyprus

=== Cyprus ===
The Greek Cypriot community had a presence in Wellington well before the Second World War. Quite a few of its members served in the New Zealand Army in North Africa, Italy and the Pacific. The Cyprus Community Association was established in 1947 with the idea of helping Cypriot people to keep their identity and culture, and at the same time promote good relations between Cypriots and New Zealanders. The Cyprian Community of New Zealand has a political voice, demonstrating against continued occupation of northern Cyprus by Turkey. On 8 May 1996 the Hon. Annette King, Member of Parliament for Miramar, moved, "That the New Zealand House of Representatives reaffirms its total support for the sovereignty and territorial integrity of the Republic of Cyprus as the only legitimate authority on the island." The motion was agreed to.

Flag of Macedonia.

=== Macedonia ===
The Greek community in New Zealand joined the worldwide opposition to the post-1991 constitutional name of Greece's northern neighbour, citing historical and territorial concerns resulting from the ambiguity between it and the adjacent Greek region of Macedonia.

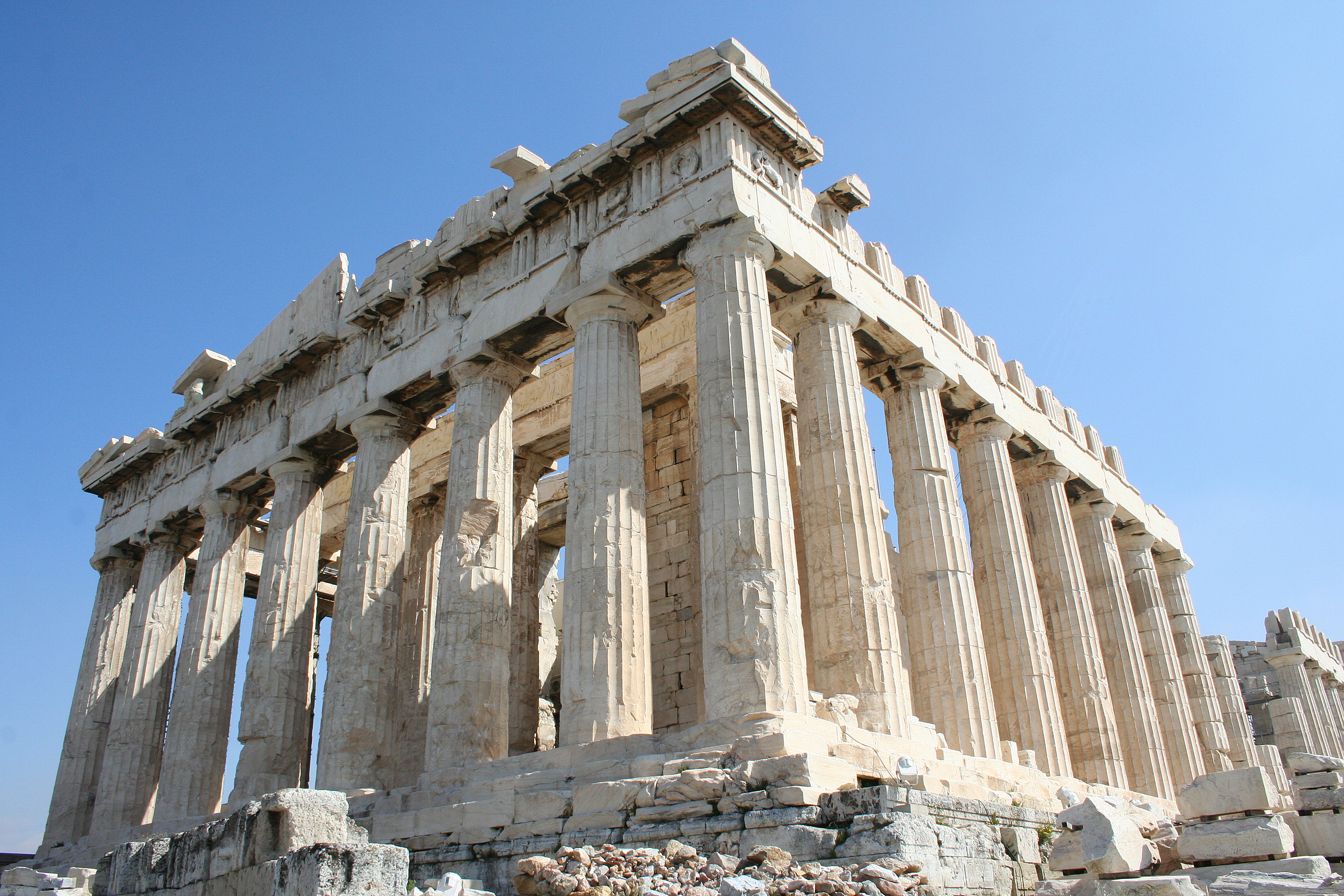
The Parthenon on the Acropolis of Athens.

=== Parthenon Marbles ===
The New Zealand Parthenon Marbles Committee was formed in 2000, as part of a worldwide campaign to seek support for the return of the Parthenon Marbles which were removed by Lord Elgin from Greece in the early 19th century. The 100+ pieces are housed at the British Museum. On 24 May 2007 the New Zealand Parliament agreed to a motion urging the British Government to return the Parthenon Marbles to Greece. Moved by Hon. Marian Hobbs, Labour Member of Parliament for Wellington Central, the motion requested that "the House joins its voice to that of other countries throughout the world and urges the British Government to support the return of the Parthenon Marbles to Greece, stressing the need for the collections of marbles in different locations to be reunited so that the world can see them in their original context in relation to the Temple of Parthenon, as an act of respect to one of the most significant monuments of western heritage." New Zealand joined a growing number of countries and international organisations also calling for their return.

== Notable Greek New Zealanders ==
=== The Arts ===
- Ray Columbus – singer, songwriter and entertainer. Columbus' great grandfather was Greek.
- Konstantin Dimopoulos – sculptor, creator of Pacific Grass, the kinetic sculpture on Cobham Drive adjacent to Wellington Airport
- Manos Nathan – clay artist
- Christodoulos Moisa – artist, poet, writer, photographer and printmaker.
- John Psathas – composer, Professor – School of Music, Humanities and Social Sciences, Victoria University of Wellington
- Spiro Zavos – historian, writer and journalist

=== Business ===
- Elisabeth Findlay – fashion designer, Zambesi
- Konstantina Moutos – fashion designer, two-time Supreme Award winner (1984 and 1986) – Benson and Hedges Fashion Design Awards
- Margarita Robertson – fashion designer, Nom*D
- Terry Serepisos – founder and first owner of Wellington Phoenix Football Club and host of The Apprentice New Zealand
- Vangelis Vitalis – diplomat and trade negotiator; New Zealand Ambassador to the European Union and NATO

=== Sport ===
- Kosta Barbarouses – association footballer
- Leo Bertos – association footballer
- Alex Feneridis – association footballer
- Themistoklis Tzimopoulos – association footballer
- Jordan Meads – rugby league footballer – captain of Greece national rugby league team

== New Zealand honours ==
The New Zealand Royal Honours system is the system of orders, decorations and medals which are awarded to recognise achievements of, or service by, New Zealanders or others in connection with New Zealand.

O.B.E. (Officer of the Order of the British Empire)

- Ray Columbus, of Christchurch. Honoured in 1974 for services to the music industry.

O.N.Z.M. (Officer of the New Zealand Order of Merit)

- Ioannis John Psathas, of Wellington. Honoured in 2005 for services to music.
- Constantine (Costa) Cotsilinis, of Athens, Greece. Honoured in 2007 for services to New Zealand-Greece relations.
- Elisabeth Findlay, of Auckland. Honoured in 2008 for services to business and fashion.
- Nicolas Calavrias, of Wellington. Honoured in 2011 for services to business.

M.N.Z.M. (Member of the New Zealand Order of Merit)

- Constantine (Costa) Cotsilinis, of Athens, Greece. Honoured in 1998 for services to New Zealand interests in Greece.
- Panaghis (Peter) Mikelatos (dec.), of Wellington. Honoured in 2003 for services to the Greek community.
- Tony Christodoulou, of Nicosia, Cyprus. Honoured in 2007 for services to New Zealand–Cyprus relations.

Q.S.M. (Queen's Service Medal)

- Metropolitan Dionysios Psiachas (dec.), of Wellington. Honoured in 1995 for community service.
- Dennis Dionysios Soulis, of Wellington. Honoured in 1995 for community service.
- Zisis (Bruce) Avangelos Blades (dec.), of Wellington. Honoured in 2004 for community service.
- Phroso Dometakis-Bell, of Wellington. Honoured in 2013 for services to the community.

Q.S.O. (Queen's Service Order)

- Esther Petritakis, of Wellington. Honoured in 2000 for services to the community.
- Stella Bares, of Wellington. Honoured in 2010 for services to the Greek community.

== Publications ==
Only works with a Greek theme are listed.

=== Documentary film ===
- Cawthorn, Richard, View from Olympus, 2010. Portrait of Wellington composer John Psathas. The film follows Psathas as he embarks on a series of new projects, both at home and abroad.
- Irwin, John, In Rich Regard, Wild Sweet Productions Ltd, 1990. A documentary on the relations between New Zealand and Crete, forged on the battlefields of World War II. The documentary features New Zealand veterans returning to Crete and reuniting with their old Cretan friends.
- The Migrating Kitchen Charitable Trust, The Migrating Kitchen, 2007. A DVD showcasing cuisine and personal stories from the Greek, Burmese, Chinese, Russian, Samoan and Somali communities of New Zealand.
- Yiannoutsos, Vicky, Visible Passage, Pinflicks, 1987. A personal and poignant documentary film in which elderly women from the Greek Island of Kastos recall past memories, including their resettlement in Wellington and their gradual acceptance into New Zealand society.

=== Fiction ===
- Christodoulos, Moisa, Blood and Koka Kola – Short Stories, 2013.
- Kyriazopoulos, Michael, Cloudy Sunday, 2013.

=== Music ===
- Daglas, Christina, Christina Daglas: Folk Songs of Greece, Manu Music, 2001.
- The Greek Band, The Greek Way, Kiwi/Pacific Records Ltd, 1983.
- The Greek Band, Yia Tin Agapi, Kiwi/Pacific Records Ltd, 1984.
- The Greek Band, The Greek Band, Kiwi/Pacific Records Ltd, 1985.
- Mythos, With the Memory, 1988.
- Nederlands Blazers Ensemble (music by John Psathas), Zeibekiko, 2009. A Greek musical celebration covering 2500 years of Greek music, Zeibekiko includes music from the Byzantine era, Taximia, traditional and popular repertoire as well as new music. Psathas has composed new works and arranged some music fragments which survived from classical antiquity.
- Psathas, John, View from Olympus: Double Concerto for percussion, piano and orchestra, 2002.
- Psathas, John, The New Zeimbekiko, 2011.

=== Non-fiction ===
- Blades, Zisis Bruce, Wellington's Hellenic mile: The Greek shops of 20th century Wellington: Z. B. Blades, 2005.
- Fragiadakis, Georgios. The Greeks in New Zealand. Wellington: Greek Orthodox Community, 1990. (This work is mainly in Greek, but there is some English text.)
- Grace, Patricia, Ned and Katina, Penguin Group, 2009. The true story of Ned Nathan, a wounded Māori Battalion soldier, who meets and falls in love with a Cretan woman, Katina.
- Verivaki, Maria and Petris, John. Stories of Greek journeys. Wellington: Petone Settlers' Museum, 1991.
- Verivaki, Maria. Language maintenance and shift in the Greek community of Wellington, New Zealand. Unpublished MA Thesis, Victoria University of Wellington, 1990.
- Viatos, Mercina, Argus, Koula & Kondos, Melpi, Favourite Greek recipes 2nd ed., Greek Orthodox Community of Wellington & Suburbs, 1994.

=== Play ===
- Vakidis, John,Tzigane, Playmarket, 1996

=== Poetry ===
- Moisa, Christodoulos, "The Desert" published by One Eyed Press, 2010 ISBN 9780986464904.
- Manasiadis, Vana, Ithaca Island Bay Leaves: a Mythistorima, Seraph Press, 2009. Part family exploration, part personal narrative, this debut poetry collection weaves the mythic into the everyday and draws on the author's Greek heritage.

== See also ==
- European New Zealanders
- Europeans in Oceania
- Greece–New Zealand relations
- Greek Australians
- Greek diaspora
- Greeks in Hawaii
- Greeks
- Immigration to New Zealand
- New Zealanders
- Pākehā
- Wellington Olympic AFC
