= Flash (Auckland newspaper) =

Flash was the first genuine community newsletter/newspaper of Auckland City in New Zealand and ran from 1977 to 1982. It was started by Vince Terrini, an architect, Auckland University School of Architecture lecturer, and creator of the Cheer Up Party, who was elected Chairman of the Westmere, Grey Lynn Community Committee in 1977. It was used to inform the local community on what was happening in the area.

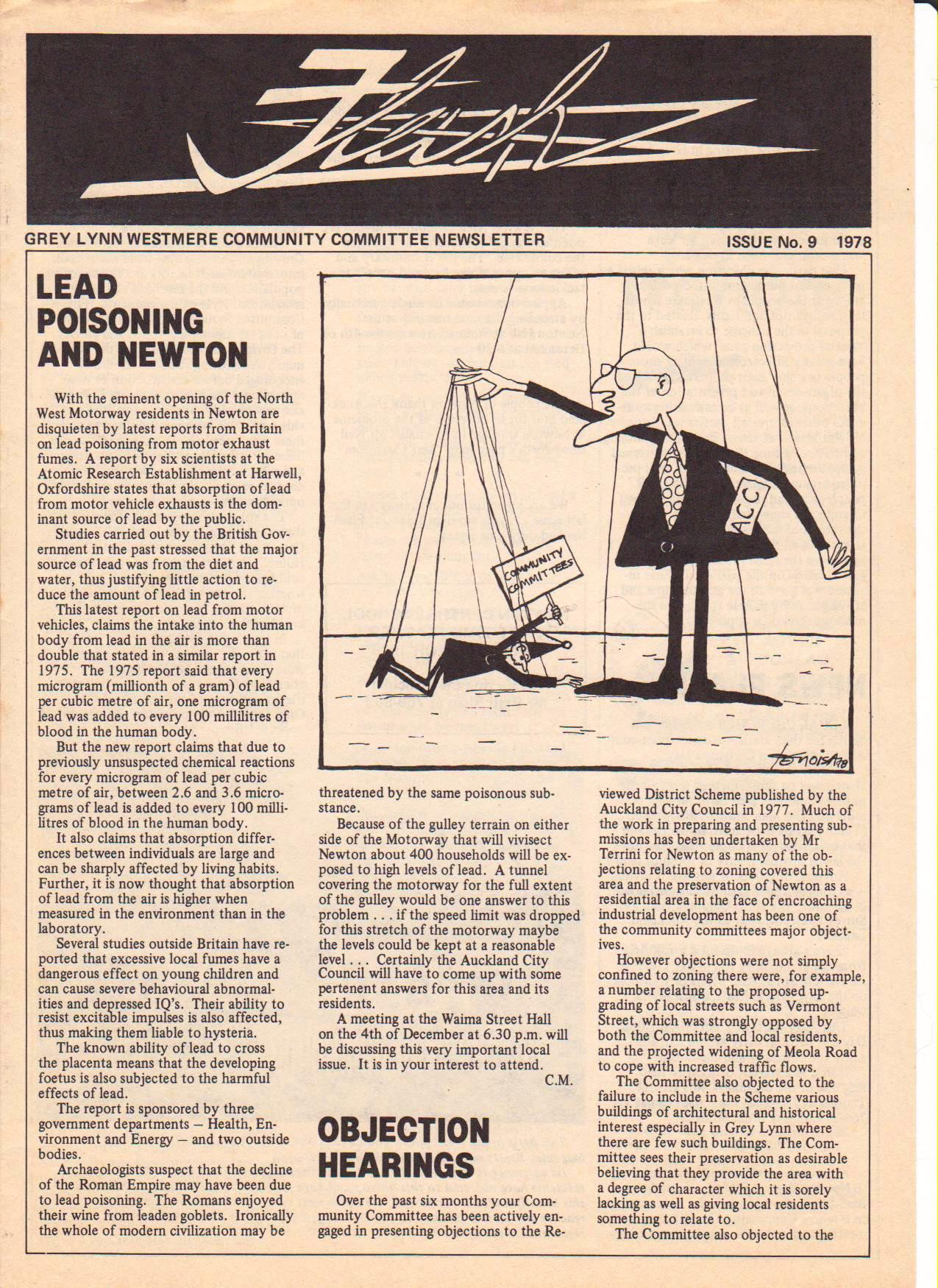
Front page, issue 9, 1978

It ran for 31 issues from November 1977 to February 1982. Its circulation areas were essentially run-down working class suburbs, with some middle class housing in western Westmere. Flash's main preoccupation was addressing the unbalanced representation on the Auckland City Council, which was perceived by Westmere and Grey Lynn residents to be dominated by wealthy Remuera-based councillors. Local people felt that they had no say on the creation of the North Western Motorway, town planning, the extension of Queen Street to Dominion Road and New North Road through Basque Park Reserve and the lead pollution from petrol that had been inflicted on the area and was to be perpetuated with the new motorway.

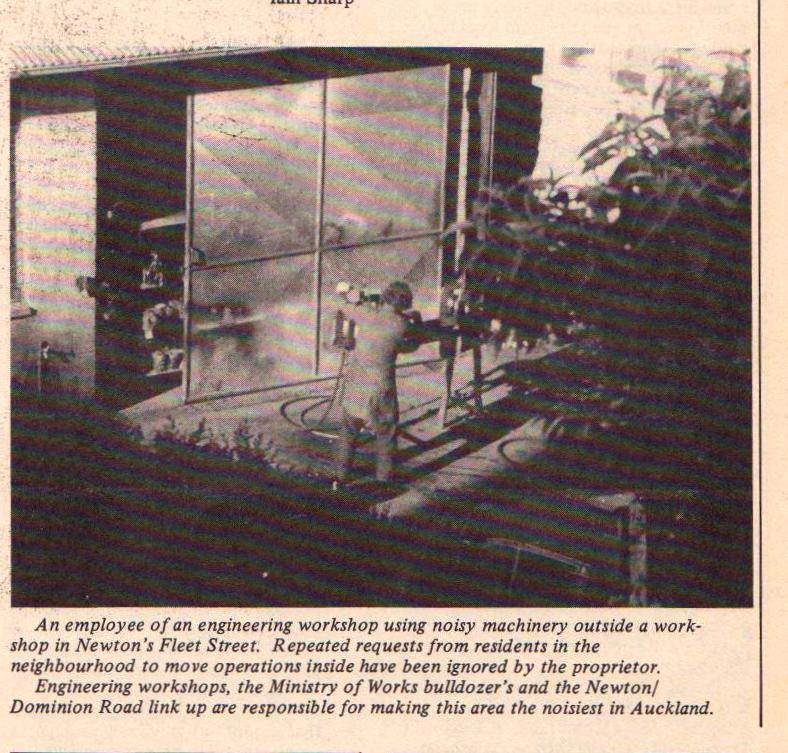
Issue 9, 1978

It was printed from a general administration grant given to community committees by the Auckland City Council.

Terrini enlisted the help of local artist and poet Christodoulos Moisa to help edit and print the publication. It slowly expanded to more pages to become a small newspaper. With the involvement of Moisa a Newton sub-branch of the committee was set up and Moisa was elected as its Chairperson. Some issues of Flash featured poems by local writers such as Iain Sharp, and cartoons by Moisa and well-known architect and cartoonist Malcolm Walker.

Flash was replaced by the Inner City News, a tabloid that closed in 1990 (and in turn was replaced by the Auckland City News). This led to the creation of community newspapers for all other suburbs of Auckland.
