= List of permanent representatives of New Zealand to the World Trade Organization =

The permanent representative of New Zealand to the World Trade Organization is New Zealand's foremost diplomatic representative at the headquarters of the WTO, and is in charge of New Zealand's diplomatic mission to the WTO.

The Permanent Delegation is located at the WTO headquarters in Geneva. New Zealand has maintained a resident Permanent Representative to the WTO since an unknown date.

== Permanent representatives to the WTO ==
- David Walker (diplomat)
- Tim Groser
- Vangelis Vitalis
