= Newton, New Zealand =

Coordinates: 36.860995°S 174.752398°E

Newton
- Suburb
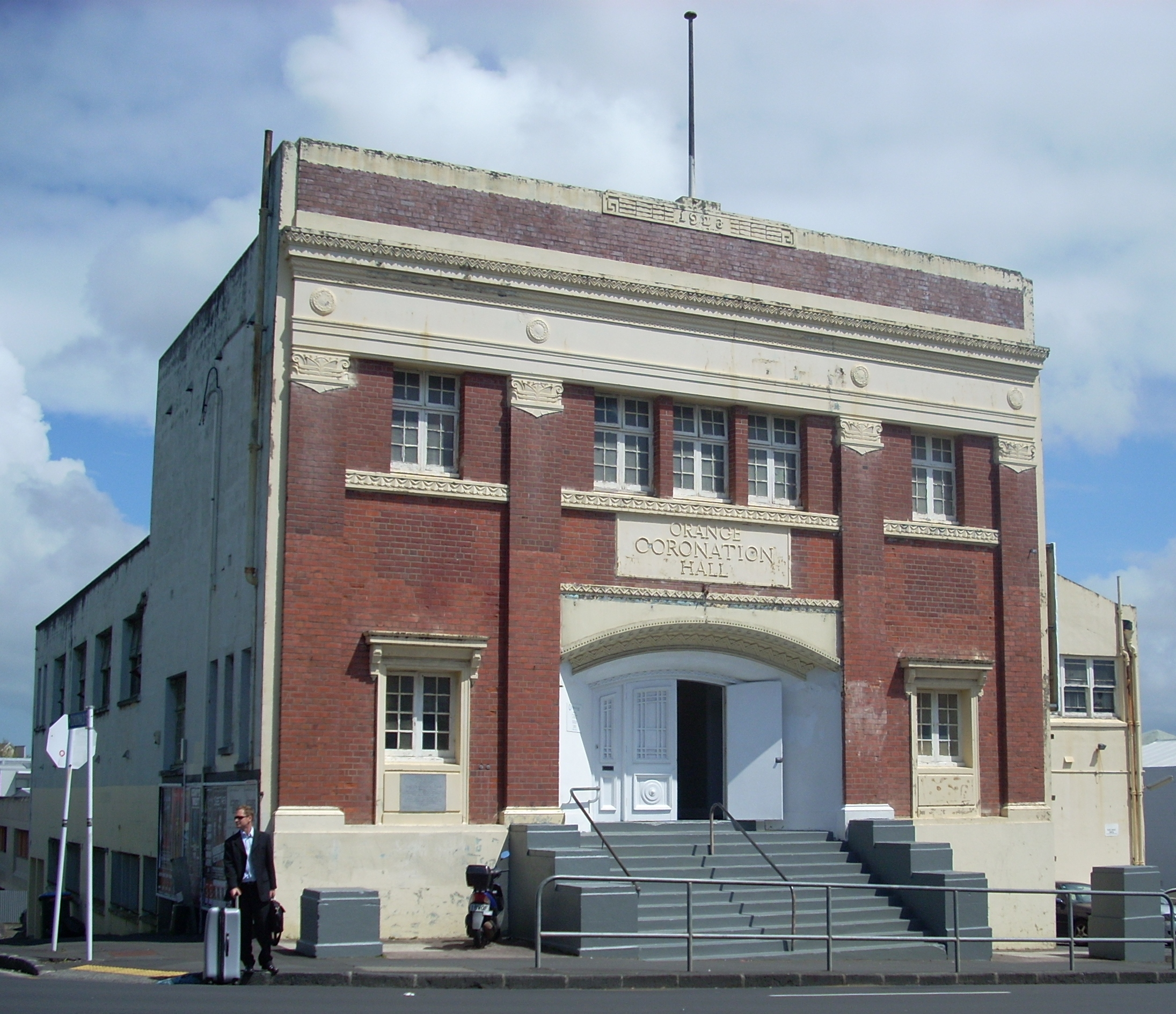
- The former Orange Hall, a well-known Newton landmark
- Interactive map of Newton
- Country: New Zealand
- City: Auckland
- Local authority: Auckland Council
- Electoral ward: Albert-Eden-Puketāpapa ward; Waitematā and Gulf ward
- Local board: Waitematā Local Board

Area
  - Land: 43 ha (110 acres)

Population (2023)
  - Total: 1,668
  - Density: 3,900/km^{2} (10,000/sq mi)

| Ponsonby | Freemans Bay | Auckland CBD |
| Arch Hill | Newton | Auckland CBD, Grafton |
| Arch Hill, Kingsland | Mount Eden | Eden Terrace |

Newton is a small suburb of Auckland, New Zealand, under the local governance of the Auckland Council.

Since the construction of the Central Motorway Junction in 1965–75, Newton has been divided into two parts, and as a result, lost much of its size and coherence. The northern part is centred on Karangahape Road, and the southern part on Newton Road and upper Symonds Street. Both Karangahape and Newton Roads intersect with Symonds Street to the east. Newton Road joins the Great North/Ponsonby and Karangahape Road intersection to the west.

At the southern end of Symonds Street are the Symonds Street Shops. Here Upper Symonds Street has two major intersections with other arterial roads: Newton Road and Khyber Pass Road, and Mt Eden Road and New North Road.

== History ==
In the 19th century Newton was the name given to a slightly different area - stretching from what is now called Surrey Crescent to Eden Terrace. References to Newton can therefore describe different areas at different times in the past; the Newton Branch of the ASB for example was built in the 1880s at the Karangahape Road end of Ponsonby Road.

The 1861 Newton Electoral district, represented by one MP, was bounded to the north by the harbour and Auckland East and West Districts, to the east by Parnell District, to the south by Cabbage Tree Rd and Karangahape Rd and to the west by Meola and Scoria Creeks.

Following the death of Sir George Grey in 1898 the northwestern portion was renamed Grey Lynn, leaving Newton as the area between Karangahape Road and Eden Terrace. The Newton Post Office has always been on Karangahape Road; the first one from 1878 was on the corner of Cobden Street (demolished 1970). Its replacement (built 1973) is located on Karangahape Road at the corner of East Street. From the late Victorian period until 2011, there was a separate Post Office serving Newton and Eden Terrace, known as Upper Symonds Street.

At the start of the 20th century the area expanded from a residential suburb into a mostly industrial and commercial area, largely in part due to the better economic climate and new electric trams in Auckland. Some smaller streets retained a largely residential character.

Historically, the suburb had a fairly dubious reputation. A 1920s newspaper described it as a "haunt of many of Auckland's best-known crooks".

This reputation was one of the reasons the Ponsonby Police Barracks were built on Ponsonby Road near the intersection with Karangahape and Newton Roads. This was the second most important Police facility in Auckland and was positioned there to enable a mass of Police to be on hand to quell anything in Freemans Bay or Newton Gully. Virtually across the road from the Police Barracks was the Star Hotel (corner of Karangahape and Newton Roads) this was a centre of Union Activity and probable Sedition. Michael Joseph Savage gave some of his early speeches at the Star Hotel.

As Newton Gully was viewed as the home of many criminals (Dennis Gunn being just one example) its combination of substandard housing, crime, and Trade Union activity was probably a contributing factor in its eventual destruction by City Planners who used the Motorway as a convenient tool to rid the city of what they considered a problem area. This was in accord with the example set by Robert Moses in New York City and emulated by similar Town Planners around the world.

Before the 1870s there were several brick works in Newton Gully including some which manufactured tiles, pipes and even 'Art Pottery'. These companies were progressively relocated to New Lynn; many 19th-century bricks found in central Auckland bear the imprint "Newton". From the 1890s onwards Newton was the location of many small scale industries: shirt, clothing and boot factories, upholstery, rattan furniture and basket manufacturing etc. It was also the location of several specialist metal works including brass foundries and bicycle importers and manufacturers.

Situated between the busy retail areas of Karangahape Road and Symonds Street (which were, and still are major routes), Newton was a fairly densely populated suburb, mainly of a working class nature with many boarding houses. Until the construction of the motorway system in the 1960s, the gully area was the location of several primary and intermediate level schools and about six churches.

In the 1880s there was concern that the domestic water supplies for the area were being contaminated by the adjacent Symonds Street Cemetery; The Newton gully was created by a stream which drains into the Western Springs area to the east. The possibility of Well water being contaminated by decomposing matter and embalming chemicals (arsenic in particular) was quite a worry, leading to the eventual closure of the cemetery and the opening of a new facility at Waikumete in West Auckland.

In the 1940s an area south of Newton Road underwent a process of slum clearance to alleviate the perceived problems of an area of densely packed sub-standard housing. Properties in Basque Street were purchased by the Auckland City Council. These were demolished and the land cleared resulting in the creation of Basque Park. The new park, which was completed around 1945, included a playground for children, ironically this facility came at a time when much of the housing in the area was being replaced with light industrial businesses so the park has never seen much of the use it was intended to see.

As a slum (or 'Decadent Area' as they were termed in the 1930s by the City Council) Newton was seen as an area of biological and moral contamination. The routing of the Motorway system through the gully in the 1960s was seen as ideal; people would relocate to new areas to live healthier lives and Auckland's traffic problems would be alleviated. It wasn't foreseen that the motorways would have a devastating effect on retail trade; the Symonds Street Shopping area was badly hit. Previously the main centre for furniture shopping for the Auckland region (Tylers, Grace Brothers, The Maple, Smith & Brown, and Jon Jensen), the Symonds Street retail trade went into a serious decline and virtually disappeared as a retail hub; its Business Association collapsed in 1976 and has only recently (2012) been revived.

After the motorway was cut through, Newton became even less of a desirable place to live with Symonds Street and Newton Road becoming almost motorway onramps. Much of the remaining housing stock in Newton was utilised for light industrial use and in many cases demolished and rebuilt as factories and warehouses. Since the 1990s there has been a reverse trend of rebuilding or converting industrial buildings for residential use including some large apartment block complexes.

Upper Symonds Street is the location of three large churches: St Benedicts Roman Catholic Church (the 2nd most important catholic Church in Auckland), The Church of the Holy Sepulchre (2nd most important Anglican Church in Auckland) and St David's Presbyterian Church. In the 20th century the Upper Symonds Street Shops were the location of several large Furniture stores; Grace Brothers, The Maple, Smith & Brown, and Jon Jensen. Also located in the area were several entertainment venues; The Orange Coronation Hall, St Benedict's Hall, a Roller Skating Rink as well as the first purpose built cinema (the 1911 Lyric; demolished in the 1990s) and one of Auckland most famous restaurant's in the 1960s, the El Matador.

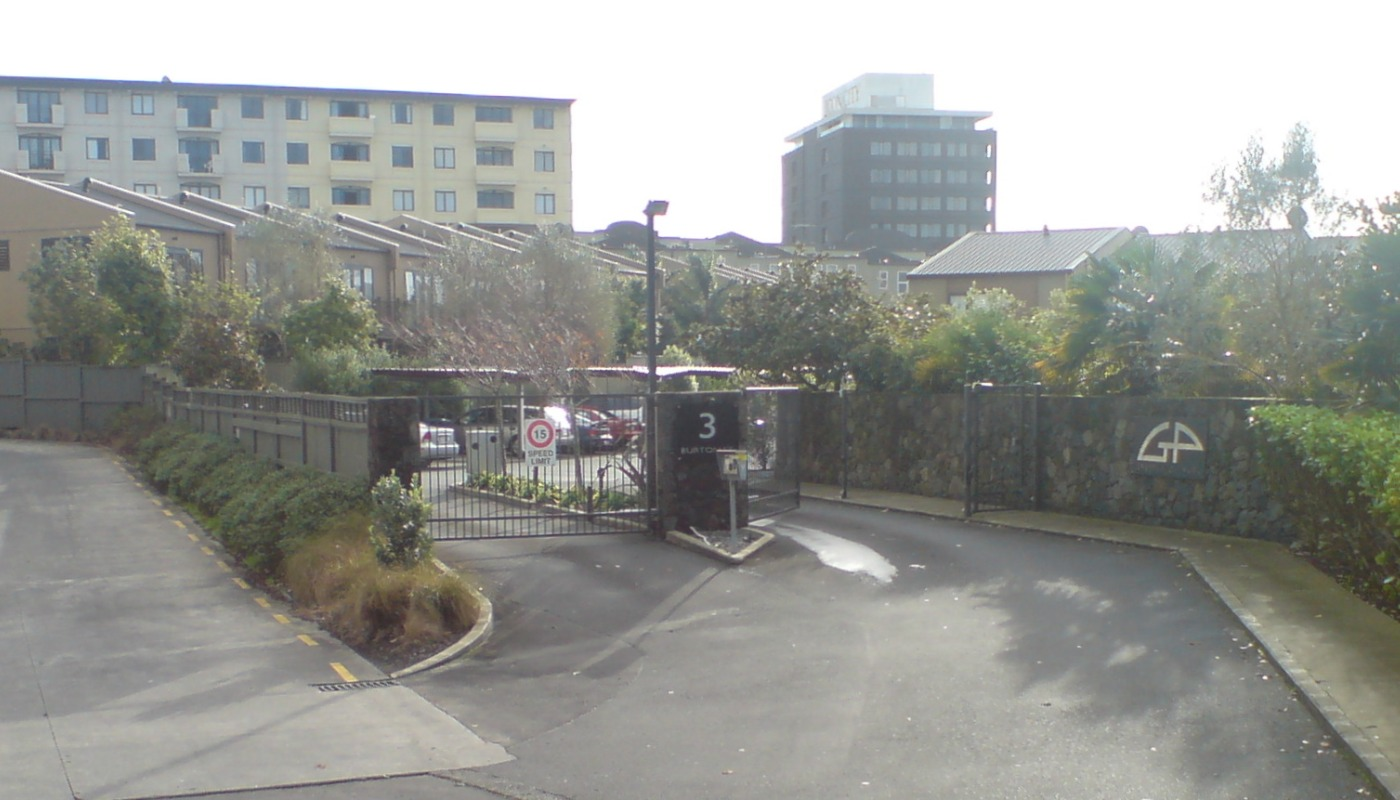
Townhouses (such as this gated community) and apartment blocks have replaced a big part of the older fabric of the eastern part of the suburb.

In the mid 1990s most of the eastern portion of the street was demolished, partially to widen the roadway. This took with it several buildings of importance including the Lyric Theatre of 1911, Tylers, the El Matador, the Astor Hotel and the BNZ (an Art Deco structure with Maori motifs). Initially the Skycity Casino and Sky Tower were intended to occupy the resulting vacant block of land but for various reasons (including sightline issues involving the profile of Mt Eden) that development was relocated away from this area. The 'missing' part of the street has subsequently been rebuilt with buildings which are very poor replacements of the lost structures.

As part of the City Rail Link project, a "Newton train station" was planned to be constructed in the suburb. However, the plan unfortunately did not materialise. The closest train station to Newton currently is the Mt Eden station, officially known as Maungwhau.

== Demographics ==
Newton covers 0.43 km^{2} (0.17 sq mi). It is covered by parts of the statistical areas of Eden Terrace and Karangahape Road.

Historical population
| Year | Pop. | ±% p.a. |
|---|---|---|
| 2013 | 1,644 | — |
| 2018 | 1,659 | +0.18% |
| 2023 | 1,668 | +0.11% |

Newton had a population of 1,668 in the 2023 New Zealand census, an increase of 9 people (0.5%) since the 2018 census, and an increase of 24 people (1.5%) since the 2013 census. There were 873 males, 759 females and 36 people of other genders in 795 dwellings. 16.5% of people identified as LGBTIQ+. There were 96 people (5.8%) aged under 15 years, 558 (33.5%) aged 15 to 29, 918 (55.0%) aged 30 to 64, and 87 (5.2%) aged 65 or older.

People could identify as more than one ethnicity. The results were 56.5% European (Pākehā); 11.3% Māori; 5.8% Pasifika; 31.8% Asian; 7.2% Middle Eastern, Latin American and African New Zealanders (MELAA); and 2.0% other, which includes people giving their ethnicity as "New Zealander". English was spoken by 96.4%, Māori language by 2.7%, Samoan by 0.7%, and other languages by 32.4%. No language could be spoken by 1.8% (e.g. too young to talk). New Zealand Sign Language was known by 0.5%. The percentage of people born overseas was 51.4, compared with 28.8% nationally.

Religious affiliations were 22.5% Christian, 5.8% Hindu, 1.8% Islam, 0.4% Māori religious beliefs, 2.2% Buddhist, 0.9% New Age, 0.5% Jewish, and 2.5% other religions. People who answered that they had no religion were 59.9%, and 4.7% of people did not answer the census question.

Of those at least 15 years old, 771 (49.0%) people had a bachelor's or higher degree, 519 (33.0%) had a post-high school certificate or diploma, and 276 (17.6%) people exclusively held high school qualifications. 309 people (19.7%) earned over $100,000 compared to 12.1% nationally. The employment status of those at least 15 was that 1,056 (67.2%) people were employed full-time, 189 (12.0%) were part-time, and 39 (2.5%) were unemployed.

== Buildings of interest ==
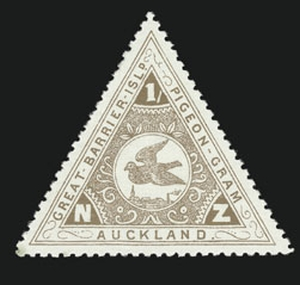
Stamp for early Pigeon-Gram service

- John Andrews & Sons Bldg - 132 Upper Symonds Street. Former Motorcar Showrooms from the late 1920s, neoclassical style building designed by A. Sinclair O'Connor.
- Saint Benedict's Church, St Benedicts Street. This Catholic brick church in the Flemish Gothic style dates from 1886 and replaces an earlier wooden church which burnt down. Both churches were by Auckland architect Edward Mahoney. The original wooden church was distinguished by a bell tower with spire, the brick replacement church was intended to replicate this design but the tower has never constructed. This is the second most important Catholic Church in Auckland and served as the Cathedral while Saint Patrick's Cathedral was closed for restoration work.
- Dominican Priory, To the south of the church is a brick Gothic presbytery also by Mahoney. now occupied by a Dominican Order of Monks. Ahmed Zaoui was allowed to live here from 2004 to 2007 while awaiting the outcome of his trial.
- St Benedict's Convent and College, On the east side of St Benedicts Street, opposite the church, is a two-storied brick house for an order of nuns (Sisters of St Joseph of the Sacred Heart). Adjacent to this building is an empty site used as a carpark. This was the location of the Edwardian St Benedicts School which was closed down in 1980 and amalgamated with Marcellin College in Royal Oak. Most of the buildings were demolished but the Hall burnt down in the late 1980s - it had been an important venue for the area; hosting dances and theatre groups.
- Freemasons Hall, St Benedicts Street. This is a large and imposing 1920s building in the neo-classical style. The architects were Chilwell & Trevithick, who apparently specialised in buildings of this type.
- The Stables. This 19th-century wood-frame building clad in corrugated iron is at the end of Stable Lane. It was built as Livery Stables for the Winstone company. This is a rare survival of an urban stable block made especially interesting by its use of corrugated iron. Recently registered by the Auckland City Council as a heritage building, the Stables has been renovated as part of a new building complex called "Site Three".
- Site Three, St Benedicts Street. A modern development including commercial offices and a cafe. It is regarded as an architectural gem, Urbis magazine's Melinda Williams referred to the "strikingly graceful concrete lines of Andrew Patterson's award winning Site Three development".
- Pigeon Post House. On the corner of Upper Queen St and Newton Road is a small wooden Victorian house. Unremarkable in itself, this is one of the very few original houses remaining in the area. It was the office of Mr Holden Howie's pigeon post service to Great Barrier Island, possibly the first regular air mail service in the world (1896). Certainly the world's first 'airmail' stamps were issued for the Great Barrier Pigeon-Gram Service from 1898 to 1908. Next to the house stood large aviaries housing the birds. WebCite query result
- Former ASB Bank, Khyber Pass Road. This small neo-classical building is one of the many buildings commissioned by the Auckland Savings Bank from the architect Daniel B. Patterson. Similar buildings appear in Auckland suburban centres and in provincial towns throughout the Auckland Province.
- Church of the Holy Sepulchre, Khyber Pass Road (opposite St David's Church). Built in 1880 to the designs of Edward Mahoney, this Anglican church has one of the best wooden church interiors in the world. This is the second most important Anglican church in the Auckland Diocese and is the headquarters for the Maori branch of the Anglican Church in New Zealand.
- Kāhui St David's, Khyber Pass Road. A brick Gothic structure originally known as St David's Presbyterian Church, which replaced an earlier wooden Gothic church by Edward Bartley. It opened in 1927 as a World War I memorial and Presbyterian church, and closed in 2020. The building was renovated and reopened in late 2023 as Kāhui St David's, a community centre.
- Eden Vine Hotel, Corner of Mt Eden Road and New North Road. Currently a restaurant and for most of the 20th century the location of an Undertakers Firm this building was built as the Eden Vine Pub. Sitting just inside the Borough of Mt Eden it was forced to close when the borough went dry around 1909.
- Former Grafton Public Library. This elegant Edwardian building in the classical style is located on Mt Eden Road near the junction with New North Road. It was designed by the architect: Edward Bartley and opened in March 1913. This building was decommissioned by the City Council in the early 1990s and was sold, becoming a pub. The current establishment is called Galbraiths Alehouse which brews its own brand of ale; it is named after a brewery which was located nearby in New North Road but demolished in the middle of the 20th century.

=== Former buildings ===
- Kings Arms Tavern. 59 France Street. An unusual survival of a 19th-century wooden pub in an urban area. Once surrounded by single storied wooden houses of the same period this building later stood alone in amongst late 20th century industrial buildings (many of which have been recently converted to housing). The tavern was demolished in 2018, with the land being redeveloped into apartment buildings.

== Education ==
Local secondary schools include Auckland Girls Grammar School, Auckland Grammar School, St Peter's College and Saint Mary's College. St Benedict's College (opened in 1886 in St Benedict's St) closed down in 1980 and was demolished. Its secondary department merged with Marcellin College, Royal Oak.

=== Notable residents ===
- John Banks (1946– ) – Mayor of Auckland City; from the ages of 15 to 17 lived at 48 East Street (now removed for the motorway)
- Dennis Gunn ( –1920) – first person convicted using fingerprints; house demolished
- Bob Harvey (1940– ) – Mayor of Waitakere City, grew up in Newton Gully in the 1950s; house removed for the motorway
- Colin McCahon (1919–1987) – renowned painter – lived in Newton Gully in the 1950s; house relocated to Freemans Bay
- Ahmed Zaoui – refugee, resided in the Dominican Priory in St Benedicts Street 2004–2007
