= Andreas Koukouma =

Cypriot literary critic

Andreas Koukouma is a commentator and literary critic of the left. As a poet he is known by his pen-name Antis Kanakis. His poems and short stories deal with universal themes and are written in the Cypriot dialect. His poems also address the Turkish invasion of 1974, which with others he unsuccessfully fought to repel, and promote the peaceful co-existence of Turkish and Greek Cypriots.

== Early life and arrest ==
Koukouma was born in Angastina a village in the Famagusta District, Cyprus, 1946. His parents were Georgios and Maria Koukoumas. He was educated at Angastina Primary School, Famagusta Gymnasium B, and after he completed his military service went to the USSR where he completed a History Degree at Moscow University. He married in a registry in Moscow to his Russian wife in 1971 and in Cyprus again (at the insistence of his father who demanded a Greek Orthodox church wedding) in 1972. They have two children.

In 1974 George Papadopoulos ordered, with the go ahead of the CIA, EOKA B to overthrow the government of President Makarios III. Within a few days Koukamas was arrested and was to be executed. Held in a Famagusta military jail, Koukoumas was on a list of 2000 left wingers that EOKA B planned to kill, but he was saved by the Turkish invasion when his captors realised they needed every soldier that they could muster if they were to repel the Turkish invasion. Because of this reprieve Koukoumas found himself in the front line. After the war like 200,000 other Greek Cypriots, he and his family became refugees moving to the south of the Green Line as Angastina the village they lived in was occupied by Turkish forces. They now live in Latsia, which has now become a dormitory suburb of Nicosia.

== Career ==
Koukouma was Secretary of EDON, Progressive Democratic Organisation of Youth (ΕΔΟΝ – Ενιαία Δημοκρατική Οργάνωση Νεολαίας), Famaguta, 1973–1977. Then he was appointed Education Officer of PEO, the Pancyprian Federation of Labour (ΠΑΓΚΥΠΡΙΑ ΕΡΓΑΤΙΚΗ ΟΜΟΣΜΟΝΔΙΑ). In 1986 he was elected mayor of Latsia, one of the towns that surround Nicosia. Ten years later in 1996 he lost the mayoralty to Christakis Christofides. In the 1992 elections he was elected to the House of Representatives of Cyprus to represent Nicosia District. In 2009 as a Latsia municipality council member he supported euroCALL ( European for adults lifelong learning).

== Journalism ==
Over the years Koukouma wrote political and literary articles and book reviews in mainly left- wing newspapers. Some of those were: Haravgi, Ergatiko Vima ("Labour Stride")and Youth, . His writing also appeared in magazines such as New Age and Cypria .

== Literary career ==
A poet, short story writer, essayist, journalist, critic and playwright, Koukouma began his writing as a child. Early in his literary career he adopted the pen name Antis Kanakis (Anti is the name Andy in English but in ancient and modern Greek can be a pun on against). His short stories are sometimes based on actual events that happened in Angastin the village that he grew up in. Giorgos Papaleontiou Kehagiogliou in History of modern Cypriot literature especially praises the "outstanding strange short story The girl with the snake.

== Poetry Books ==
- To Bloodied Cyprus, Published by EDON, Famagusta, Cyprus,1975.
- Poems, 1975.
- Memory and Conscience, 1977.
- Without the AN, Nicosia, Cyprus, 1997. OCLC 38281443.
- Writing History, 1978.
- The Ship, Nicosia,1980.
- We Continue, Printed by Avghi(Dawn), Nicosia 1982.
- Action Deduct, 1985.
- Retrospective Reflection,1992.
- Mesaritika Motiva, 1992.
- Illuminated Line, 2000.

== Short stories ==
- The Root, Printed by AVGI (Dawn), Nicosia, 1986.
