= Pigeon Post House =

Coordinates: 36°51′47″S 174°45′30″E

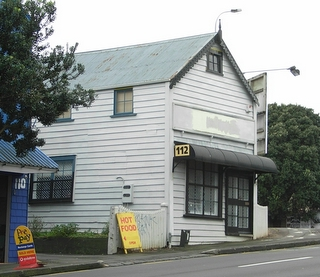
Pigeon Post House in 2007

The Pigeon Post House is located at 112 Newton Road, Newton, Auckland, New Zealand, on the corner of Newton Road and Upper Queen Street.

From 1897 into the early 20th century the building was used as a pigeon-carrier postal service between Great Barrier Island and Auckland. It was New Zealand's first regular air-mail postal service.

Today, the building is a private residence.
