= Christodoulos Moisa =

New Zealand poet (born 1948)

Christodoulos Evangeli Georgiou Moisa (born 1948) is a New Zealand poet, artist, photographer, writer, essayist and art teacher.

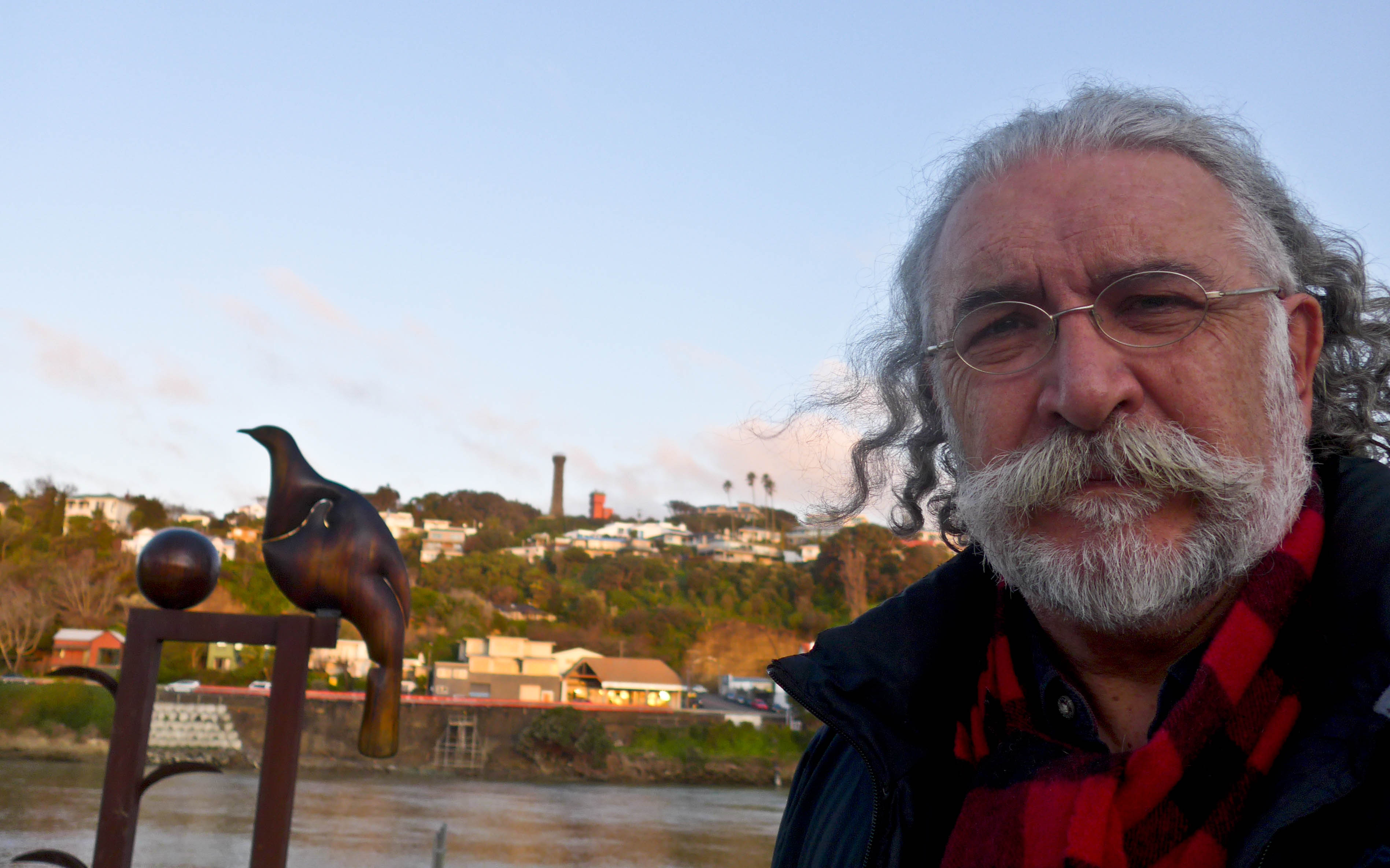
Christodoulos Moisa

== Early life ==
Moisa was born in 1948 in Lower Hutt, New Zealand. His parents were immigrants from Cyprus. His father was Evangelos Georgiou Moisa from Marathovounos and his mother was Athena Kleanthi from Angastina two villages in central Cyprus.

== Background ==
Moisa was educated at Patriki and Angastina Primary Schools in Cyprus, Mount Cook Primary School, Wellington (1960–1962), Wellington College (1963–1967), and Victoria University of Wellington and University of Auckland in New Zealand. He attended the Sir John School of Art London in 1973 and The Quay School of the Arts at UCOL, Whanganui, New Zealand in 2002. At The Quay School of the Arts, he completed his Bachelor of Fine Arts which he started at Auckland University in 1972, in print-making. From 1954 to 1959 he lived in Varosia/Famagusta a provincial capital in eastern Cyprus and the villages of Patriki and Angastina. He also lived in Angastina 18 months before 1974 coup and Turkish invasion.

== Poetry and art ==
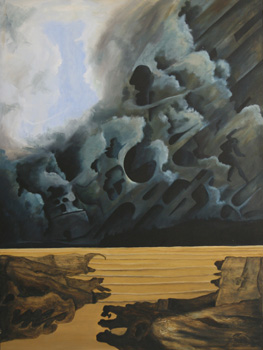
Storm over the Waitemata painted by Moisa in 1977. Oil on board.

He was awarded the National Poetry Prize at the Te Awamutu Rose Festival in 1981, the Queen Elizabeth the II Arts Council Fellowship in 1983, and the Whitirea Poetry Prize in 1991 for his long poem "In the Shadow of the Cathedral".

During his Queen Elizabeth the II Arts Council fellowship tenure he trialed a scheme whereby the arts would be taught to people who were unlikely to receive such training. Moisa taught poetry at Dunedin's Crippled Children Society. This scheme eventually led to the Arts in Prisons Scheme. In the seventies Moisa taught art as a volunteer to inmates at Mount Eden Prison, in Auckland.

He is the owner/manager/editor of One Eyed Press which has published the poetry of New Zealand poets among them Iain Sharp, Win Jones, and Peter Olds. To date Moisa has published seven of his own books of poems also under the One Eyed Press imprint.

In 2002 Moisa was the recipient of a Ministry of Education Teachers Fellowship which he used to complete his BFA. In 2006 he was the Winner of the Telecom Art Contest for Whanganui. He has had nine one-person exhibitions and participated in a number of group shows. Moisa has read his poetry throughout New Zealand and in Germany and Cyprus. He was an Executive member of the New Zealand Branch of PEN, now New Zealand Society of Authors (PEN New Zealand Inc.), in the 1980s and was the founder of the Dunedin and Christchurch branches.

Moisa has also written for Te Ara (New Zealand National Library's online encyclopaedia). He has written a series of essays such as: The Big Sigh, Bitter Kiwifruit and Felix the Cat Versus Mr Morgan. In 2004 Moisa launched the Whanganui Inter-Secondary Schools Portrait Competition to promote the talent of young secondary school artists in the Whanganui region. It is now in its eighth year.

== Political and social activist ==
As a political activist, Moisa demonstrated with other university students against the war in Vietnam and later on the occupation of Timor and Cyprus. He also took part in the demonstrations against the 1981 South African Springbok Rugby Tour. As a social activist and Chairperson of the Newton branch of the Grey Lynn, Westmere, Newton Community Committee, in the late 1970s Moisa led in Auckland a campaign against lead in petrol and with the architect, university lecturer and Cheer Part-Up Party leader, Vince Terrini, established Flash, one of the precursors to all the Auckland community newspapers. At the same time he also led a campaign to stop the extension of upper Queen Street – the city's main street – to Dominion Rd. He won a case against the Auckland City Council in the Town Planning Court and as a result, the north-facing Basque Park has remained a peaceful residential haven.

In 2011 Moisa wrote a brief history of his mother's village in Cyprus and designed and compiled a website to ensure that its history will outlive the Turkish occupation. The site is called Angastina – The village of the lotus-eaters.

In 2013 Moisa's first book of short stories was published. Blood and Koka Kola. It includes four illustrations and 24 short stories.

In January 2016, Moisa's first novel The Hour of the Grey Wolf was published followed by a second "Overcast Sunday" in June 2016. In 2018 the second novel in the Wolf Trilogy, Wolves in Dogs' Clothing was published.

== Books of poems ==
- 1977 – The Muriwai Motel Sonnets (Poems and Drawings)
- 1980 – Corrigendum (Poems and Drawings)
- 1987 – Thirteen or so Poems to in between. (Eighteen Poems – 32 pages)
- 1987 – Recoil (Long Poem – and six collages – 24 pages)
- 1987 – Elegy (Long Poem – 19 pages)
- 1987 – Rotlands (Long Poem – 24 pages)
- 2010 – The Desert (Long Poem-100 copies) )
- 2016 - The Desert, 2nd edition

== Short stories ==
- Blood and Koka Kola.

"Blood and Koka Kola is a mix of tales...Some are told in the traditional manner; with a beginning, middle and end; others are short staccato bursts of poetic energy, gorgeous in their use of language and satisfying as a good story should be...None is disappointing. Each story is a good read, and the variety of construction adds to the interest and encourages further exploration...For your average Kiwi, it adds an exotic touch and extra interest...Some stories make you wonder where they come from, how they arrived in the author’s imagination, but they ‘re so good you’d be pleased they did." Paul Brooks - Midweek

Moisa's stories cover a range of subject matter and character portrayals. This collection includes stories set in New Zealand as well as Cyprus in the late 1950s and in 1973 and 1974. Several of Moisa’s stories in Blood and Koka Kola feature surprise endings.

== Novel ==
- The Hour of the Grey Wolf, Christodoulos Moisa 2016, ISBN 978-1519445988

CRITICS COMMENTS: "The writing style can best be described as erudite with allusions to historical and Biblical events. In a less fluent writer, these descriptions would slow the story down but this is not the case ... The book remains fast-moving while giving the reader the satisfaction of having read a novel of substance and at the same time enjoying trying to second guess the mystery murder element. I recommend it." The Hour of the Grey Wolf is a crime story ... in many ways, it defies the genre. It is literary fiction as well, experimental in form, so experimental that, simply linked together with logic, the parts should not work together to form that coherent whole. And yet they do. ... a compelling page-turner, a classic whodunit. ... I kept turning the pages and am certain other readers will too. The overall effect of The Hour of the Grey Wolf cannot be denied: the setting and characters are still resonating with me ..."

- Overcast Sunday, Christodoulos Moisa 2016,ISBN 9781523354214

CRITICS COMMENTS: "While the main story is sufficient to hold your interest, it is embellished with a cultural richness that sets it apart from just another "Who-dunnit"...The cleverly devised plot will keep you intrigued right through to the end...For those of us familiar with Wellington during the 1950s' "Overcast Sunday" will evoke a few memories of a time and lifestyle that no longer exists. The title itself belongs to a song, a type of blues music in keeping with the sentiments of love, joy and sorrow and particularly poignant for immigrants far from their homeland. The book gives examples of the hardships, hopes and dashed dreams which marked their lives and the reasons for moving to New Zealand. Like all immigrants they found it to be no promised land and this informs and colours the book as various incidents are woven into the plot..." Marion Davidson RIVER CITY PRESS 17 November 2016.

This book features a murder, but focuses primarily on the location, time period, and characters of the Greek community in Wellington, New Zealand, in 1950. The narrative incorporates the economic, political, and social environment of the era. Rather than using a traditional narrative format, Chris Moisa structures the book in an unconventional layout to detail the characters' backgrounds and the community.

- Wolves in Dogs Clothing, Christodoulos Moisa 2017,ISBN 978-1548977368

CRITICS COMMENTS: "The novel is set in Cyprus during the coup and the Turkish invasion in 1974 and the major plot based on a series of brutal murders is supported by a number of equally intriguing subplots .... the writing style is a combination thriller and interesting snippets about history, politics, society and mythology. It is a style that I appreciate. I learn while I am kept enthralled by the action. ... the Turkish invasion, which Chris although from a Greek background, writes about with admirable balance and gives another depth to the novel. Chris ... writes with an assuredness of someone who is in control of his craft ..." Doug Davidson - River City (23 November 2017)

"... has done his research and knows the time and place of which he writes, but his own writing skills give honesty to the characters and how they live their lives. The conversations are real, without being too mundane, and how they look, dress and act completes a populated word landscape too real to be complete fiction." Paul Brooks - Midweek / New Zealand Herald (10 January 2018)

- Thrown to the Wolves, Christodoulos Moisa 2017,ISBN 978-0-9864649-4-2

Currently Moisa lives in Whanganui and works as a novelist, artist, photographer. He was HOD of The Arts and HOD of the Visual Arts at a Whanganui College between 2003 and 2014.
