= Greece–New Zealand relations =

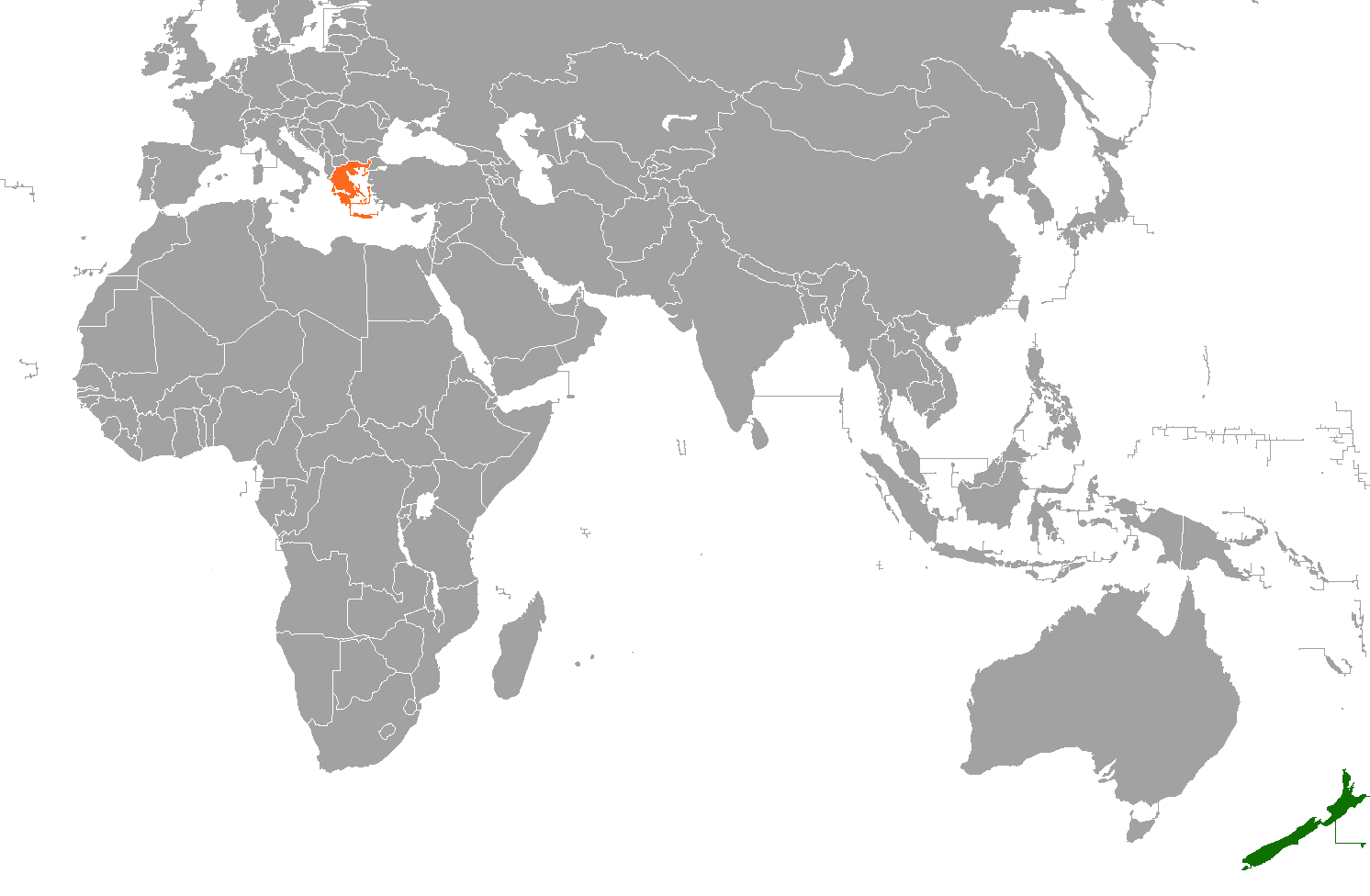

- New Zealand: Greece

Greece–New Zealand relations are bilateral relations between Greece and New Zealand. Greece is accredited to New Zealand from its embassy in Canberra, Australia. New Zealand has a non-resident ambassador in Rome, Italy.

== History ==
Stemming from World War II, New Zealand forces fought alongside the Greeks in continental Greece and Crete. Since then, Greece has claimed a special relationship with New Zealand. An under-equipped force made-up of largely New Zealand, Australian, British and Greek troops fought to protect the island from invasion. The invasion of Crete by German paratroops began on 20 May 1941 and ended seven days later with the evacuation of 16,500 Commonwealth troops. Allied losses in the Battle of Crete numbered 15,743. New Zealand casualties were 671 killed and 967 wounded, while 2,180 were taken prisoner. The Battle of Crete is commemorated every year in both Crete and New Zealand. Prime Minister Helen Clark led a large party from New Zealand to Crete in May 2001 to attend the 60th anniversary of the battle. The Minister of Foreign Affairs, Hon Phil Goff, attended anniversary celebrations in May 2003, and Hon Annette King in May 2006. The war was followed by a modest wave of Greek emigration to New Zealand. In the 2006 census 2,547 people primarily identified themselves as being Greek. A bilateral Social Security Agreement came into force on 1 April 1994.

In May 2007, New Zealand hosted Prime Minister Kostas Karamanlis for a short visit – the first-ever by a Greek Prime Minister to New Zealand.

As part of an effort to redeploy resources in Europe, New Zealand closed its embassy in Athens in 1991, since then it has been represented in Greece through its embassy in Rome which is accredited accordingly. It does still retain an honorary consulate general in Athens, however. There are also Honorary Greek Consulates in Auckland and Wellington. The Greek Embassy in Wellington opened in 1999 and suspended operations in 2015, after a review following the Greek government-debt crisis.

== Relations ==
The prevailing climate in political relations between Greece and New Zealand was demonstrated in 2002 by the visit of the President of the Hellenic Republic to Wellington, which confirmed the excellent state of relations between the two countries.

=== Social Security Agreement ===
The social security agreement between the governments of New Zealand and Greece allows former residents of either country access to certain benefits and pensions under the other country's social security system.

== High level visits ==
=== Greek tours by New Zealand delegates and ministers ===
Dates	Minister/Delegate	Cities visited	Reason
June 2006	Governor-General, Dame Silvia Cartwright	Athens, Various	Official Visit
May 2006	Minister of Police, Hon Annette King	Athens, Crete	Commemorate the Anniversary of the Battle of Crete
September 2004	Minister of Transport, Hon Pete Hodgson	Various	Official Visit
August 2004	Minister for Sport and Recreation, Hon Trevor Mallard	Various	Official Visit
May 2003	Minister of Foreign Affairs and Trade, Hon Phil Goff	Athens, Crete	Commemorate the Anniversary of the Battle of Crete
May 2001	Prime Minister, Rt Hon Helen Clark	Crete	Commemorate the 60th Anniversary of the Battle of Crete
1998	Governor-General, Sir Michael Hardie-Boys	Athens, Various	Official Visit
May 1997	Minister of International Trade, Dr Lockwood Smith	Various	Official Visit
March 1992	Minister of Foreign Affairs and Trade, Rt Hon Don McKinnon	Athens	Official Visit
May 1991	Minister of Defence, Hon Warren Cooper	Athens	Official Visit
1989	Minister of Foreign Affairs and Trade, Hon Russell Marshall		Official Visit
1989	Minister for Overseas Trade, Rt Hon Mike Moore		Official Visit
1983	Prime Minister, Rt Hon Robert Muldoon		Official Visit

=== New Zealand tours by Greek delegates and ministers ===
Greek Ministerial Visits to New Zealand

Dates	Minister/Delegate	Cities visited	Reason
May 2007	Prime Minister, Kostas Karamanlis	Wellington	Official Visit
June 2002	President, Constantinos Stephanopoulos	Wellington	Official Visit
March 1995	Under-secretary of National Economy and Minister for External Trade, Iannis Anthopoulos		Official Visit
1993	Secretary of State, Byron Polydoras	Wellington	Official Visit

== Resident diplomatic missions ==
- Greece is accredited to New Zealand from its embassy in Canberra, Australia.
- New Zealand is accredited to Greece from its embassy in Rome, Italy.

== See also ==
- Foreign relations of Greece
- Foreign relations of New Zealand
- Greeks in New Zealand
