= Konstantina Moutos =

Greek-New Zealand fashion designer (born 1964)

Konstantina Moutos (born Wellington, New Zealand 1964) is a Greek-New Zealand fashion designer. She won the Supreme Award at the Benson & Hedges Fashion Design Awards twice, in 1984 and 1986.

== Life ==
Moutos was born to Greek parents. She established a studio in Wellington, and supplied boutiques in both Wellington and Auckland. In 1991, she was one of the judges for the Benson & Hedges awards.

In 1991, Moutos moved to Greece, and continued her career as a fashion designer there. The black evening gown which won her the 1986 award was featured in an exhibition, entitled Black in Fashion, in Auckland in 2011 that was curated by the New Zealand Fashion Museum.
