= Angastina =

Angastina: Αγκαστίνα (Greek); Aslanköy (Turkish)
- Village
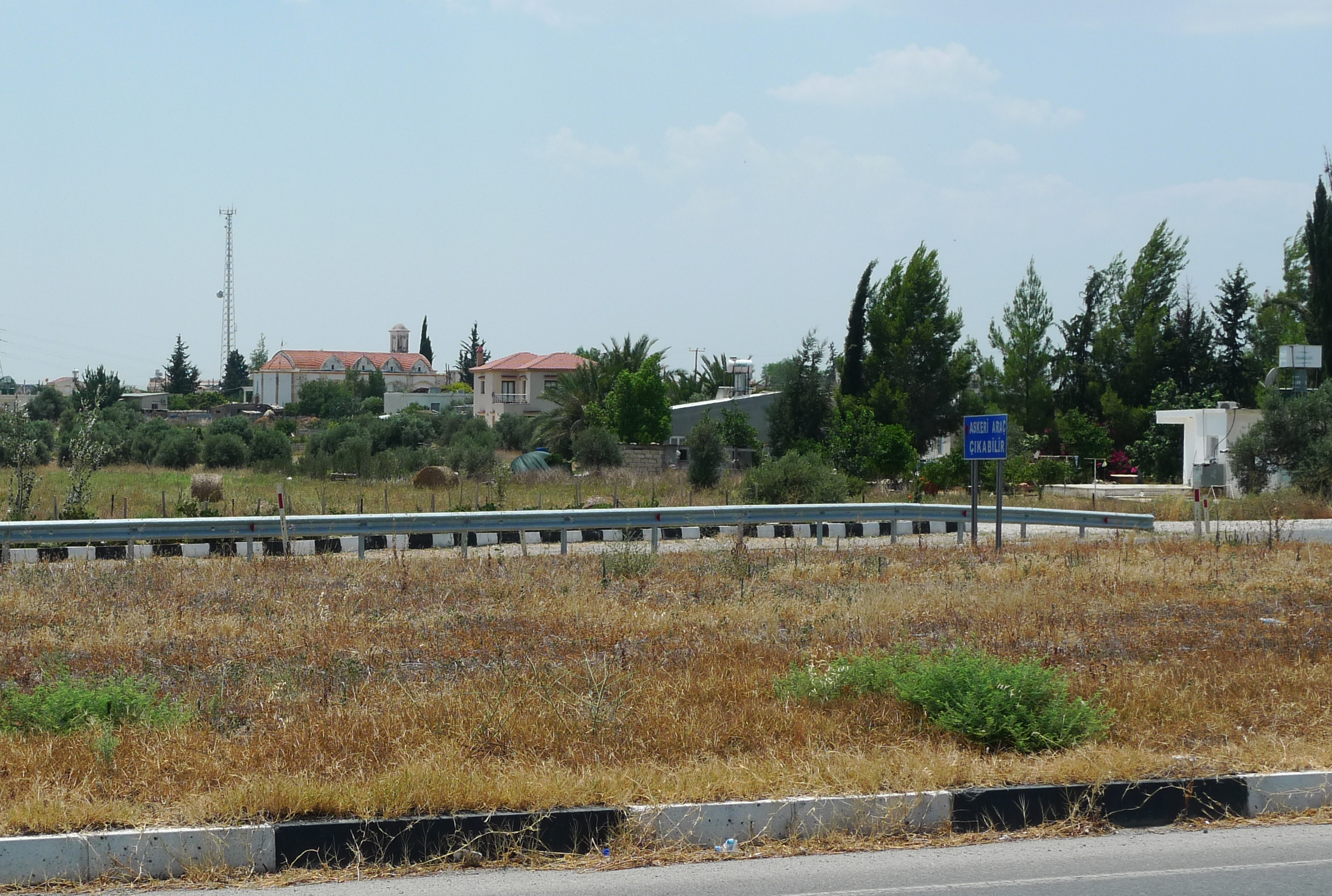
- Angastina, Cyprus, 2012. Viewed from the northern Nicosia to Famagusta highway. Note the bell tower of Agia Paraskevi right of the communications tower

- Location in Cyprus
- Coordinates: 35°12′8″N 33°35′11″E
- Country (de jure): Cyprus
  - District: Famagusta District
- Country (de facto): Northern Cyprus
  - District: Gazimağusa District
- Elevation: 217 ft (66 m)

Population (2011)
  - Total: 439
- Time zone: UTC+2 (EET)
  - Summer (DST): UTC+3 (EEST)

Angastina (Greek: Αγκαστίνα; Turkish: Aslanköy) is a village in the Famagusta District of Cyprus, located around 20 km east of Nicosia, on the main road to Famagusta. It is under the de facto control of Northern Cyprus. Angastina is perched on a gentle river terrace chalk escarpment over the Pedias river plain at 66 metres above sea level.

== Etymology ==
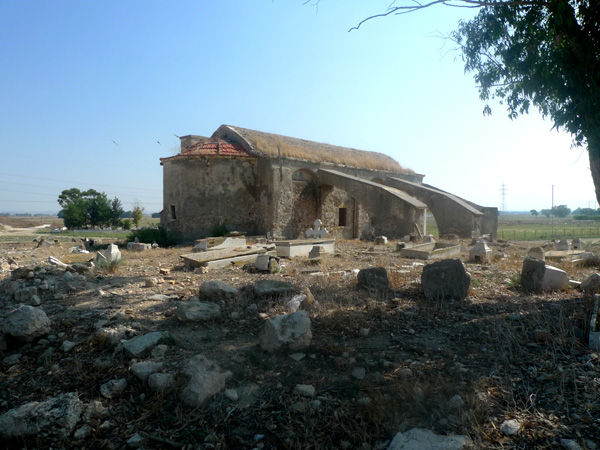
The Church of Agios Therapon in Angastina, 2010.

It was suggested by Nearchos Clerides, in Villages and Cities of Cyprus, that Angastina had been named from the Frank word gastina for crust. This alludes to the thick rocky shell rock (kafkala-Greek Cypriot for crust) that covered the surrounding mesas and on which the last version of the village was built. He suggested that name was modified by the locals and made their own by adding the A. This is possible as the nearby village of Mora was "entirely a Frankish town under Frankish occupation. It was owned by the House of Moravit and it was named Mora for short. Cyprus at that time was ruled by the French House of Lusignan." The Franks arrived in Cyprus "in the high and late Middle Ages, between 1192 and 1489. However, George Jeffrey speculated that the name (on ancient maps "Angestrina ") may be from "neo-latin origin (1500–1900)". Christos Diakos in Angastina - History and Traditions agreed, saying "The church of Agios Therapon existed at our village since Byzantine time."

The name of the village was Agios Therapon. The name Angastina appears at the time of the Venetians. The main church of Angastina up to 1974 was Agia Paraskevi, which has since been converted into a mosque. Until 1950 the village was on the rail line that connected Famagusta and Nicosia; there is now a motorway.

== History ==
=== Early history ===
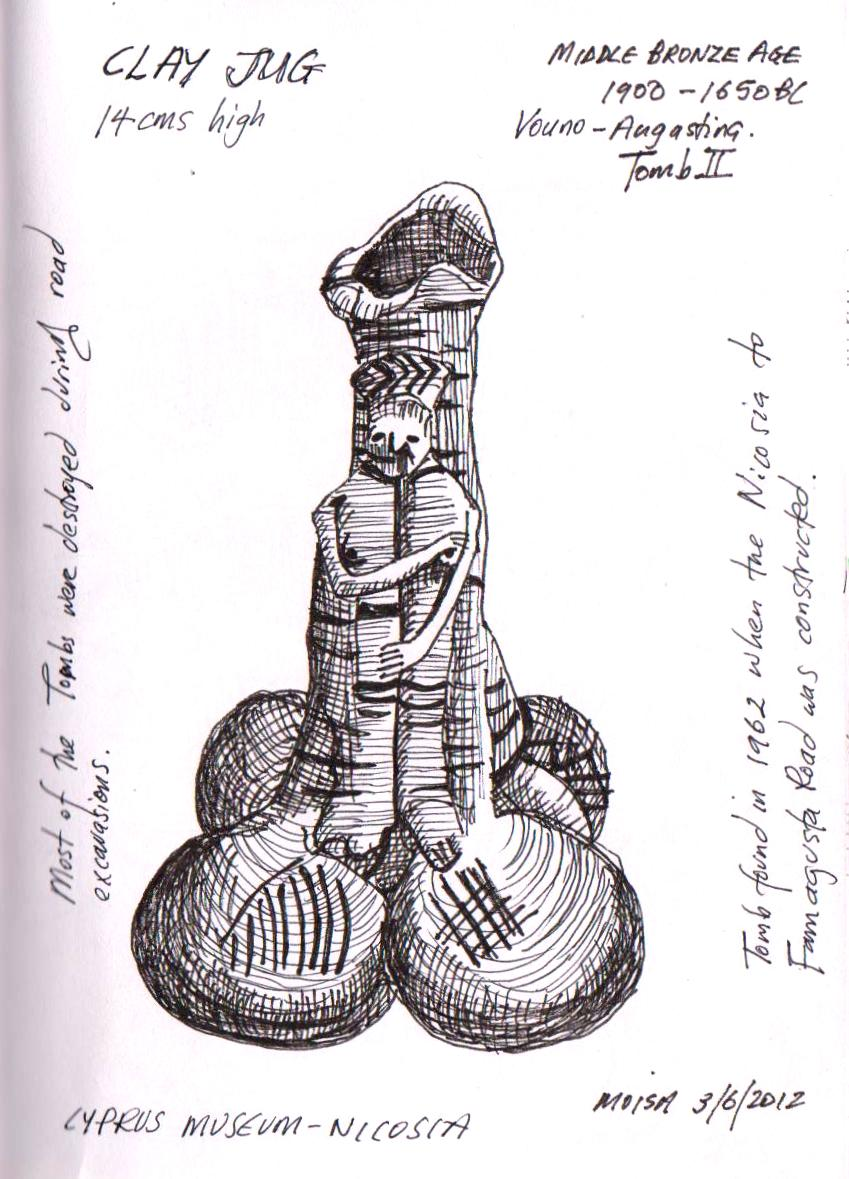
Prehistoric jug from Vouno, Angastina (2012 drawing)

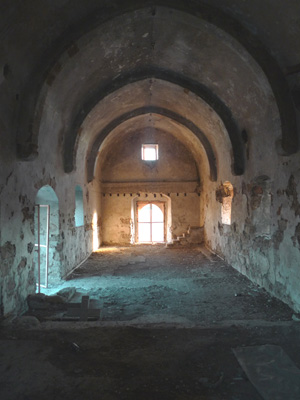
Church of Agios Therapon, Angastina (2012)

The Cypro-Mycenaean (10,000-800 BC) archaeological burial site of Vouno was excavated 2 km east of the village in 1962 when a new road to Famagusta was put through. According to Georgious Kyriakos in Cyprus Heritage, artifacts (now at the Cyprus Museum) found in Vouno include "A Composite vase of White Painted V ware. It consists of four spherical parts joined to a common neck with a pinched mouth. A female figurine is attached to the neck; her right hand holding her breast and the left her abdomen." This dates from the Middle Cypriot III period (1725–1625 BC).

During the Crusades, in or near the village was a fort for the cavalry of the Knight Templars (1291).

There are remnants of an older village, to the southeast towards Assia, which are still called Halospita (Ruined Houses).

=== The murder of Nikoli Philippou ===
As many other villages in Cyprus, Angastina, until 1907, was bi-communal. On 17 August of that year a murder occurred that would eventually drive a wedge between the village's Christian and Muslim communities. A young Turk fell in love with a married Greek woman. He was warned off but took it to heart and stupidly fired upon a company of young Greek men very late at night while they were having a coffee in the village square. One the Greek young men suspecting the young Turk took the Police to the young Turk's house. The young Turk confessed and the father offered monetary retribution. The young Greek man refused to be bought off by the father so the young Turk was arrested by the Police. The father was furious that the young Greek man would not accept the money. That night he went with his son inlaw to the threshing field which the young Greek man was guarding with his mother-in-law nearby. The Turkish father murdered him while he was asleep by bashing his head in with a rock. Eventually the Turkish father was arrested and he and his son in law were tried, sentenced and hung by the British authorities of the island. The whole story is recorded in the ballad "The murder of Nikoli Philippou" by C. T. Palaisi written at the time and the local press. After that event all Turkish Angastiniotes sold up and moved to nearby Turkish villages.

=== The Turkish invasion of 1974 ===
Since the Turkish invasion in 1974, the village has been inhabited by Turkish Cypriots and Turkish mainland settlers.

== Agriculture ==
Angastina has vineyards and until World War II cotton was grown extensively in the area. Wheat, barley and lentils were the main cereals grown before the 1974 Turkish invasion.

== Famous Angastiniotes ==
The monks Chariton (1887–1973), Stephanos (1894–1974) and Barnabas (1897–1974) of the monastery of the apostle Barnabas in Enkomi painted icons, both to decorate the ancient church and to sell.

The naïve artist Nicos Nicolaides (1884–1956), and the politician and poet Andreas Koukouma (1947- ) were also born in Angastina.

== Churches ==
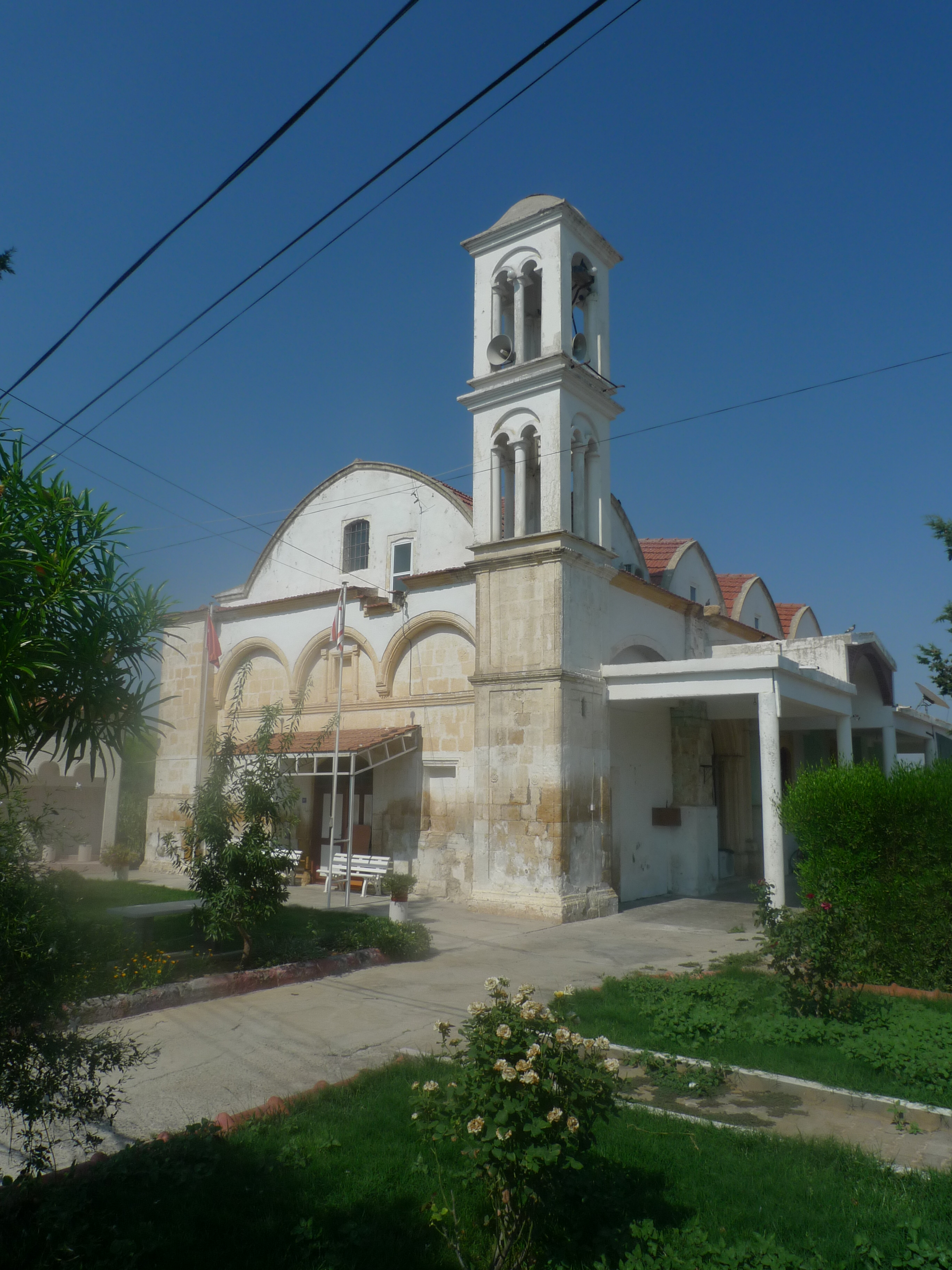
Agia Paraskevi, 2012

- Agia Paraskevi is a Greek Orthodox church that was converted into a mosque after the Turkish invasion of 1974. It was built in 1878 on an older church of the same name. In 1920 a lightning strike felled the bell tower and a new one was erected in 1957-58.
- Agios Therapon is a Greek Orthodox church and cemetery.
- Agios Georgios was a Greek Orthodox church in the outskirts of the village. All that remains now are some ruins where it once stood.
