= Vangelis Vitalis =

New Zealand diplomat and trade negotiator

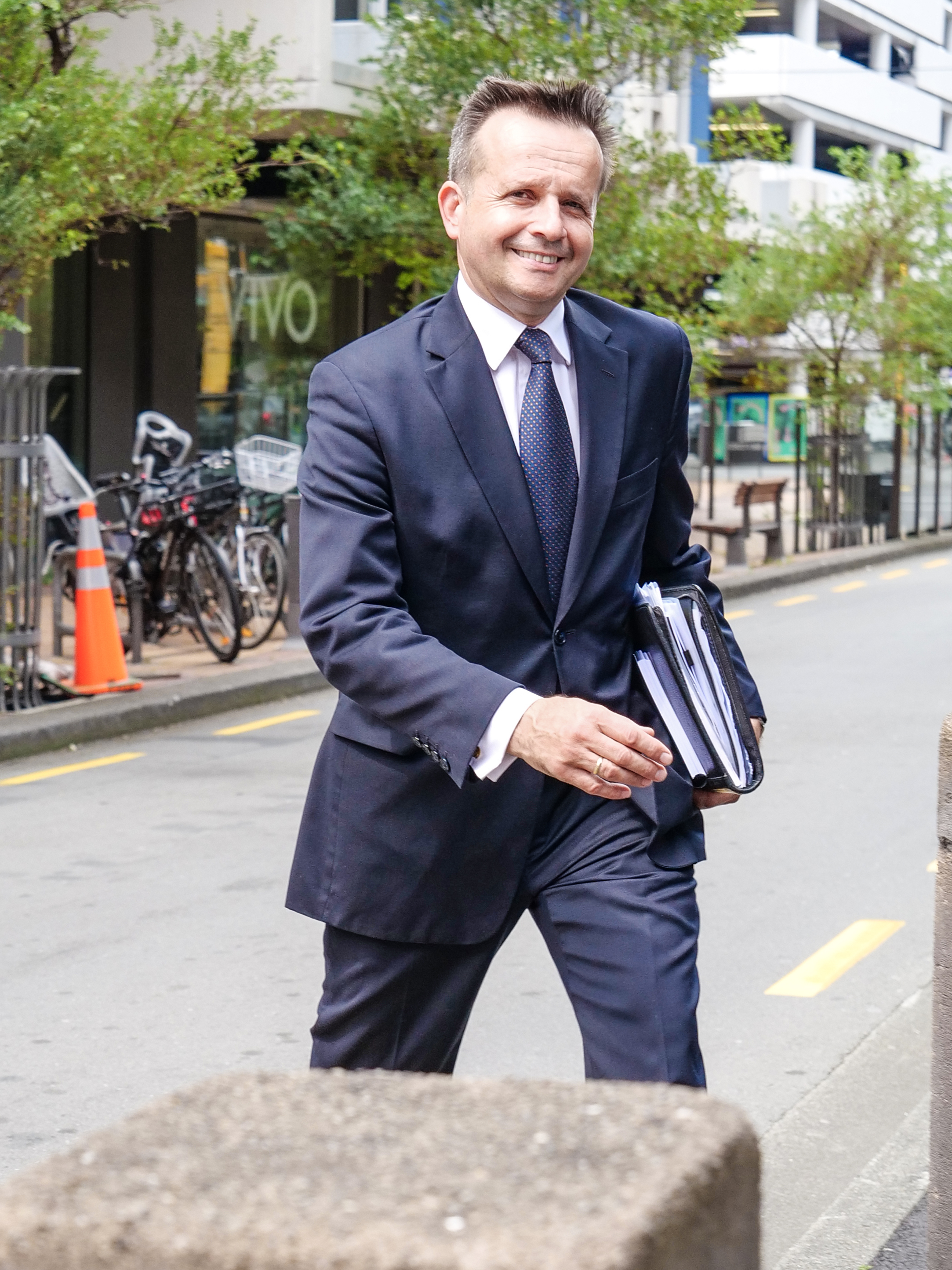
Vangelis Vitalis as the Senior Official's Meeting Chair at APEC 2021

Vangelis (Evangelos) Vitalis is a New Zealand diplomat and trade negotiator currently working as the Deputy Secretary for the country's Ministry of Foreign Affairs and Trade.

Prior to taking up his role in Wellington in 2017, Vangelis was New Zealand's Permanent Representative to the World Trade Organisation (WTO) in Geneva where he chaired the agriculture negotiations in a personal capacity. In this role he helped draft the text of the historic Nairobi WTO Ministerial Decision to eliminate agricultural export subsidies. Vangelis has also been the Ambassador to the European Union and NATO in Brussels and has had postings to Canberra and Moscow.

Vitalis is the first Greek-New Zealander to be appointed ambassador.

== Career ==
=== Ministry of Foreign Affairs and Trade, Wellington, New Zealand ===
Vitalis is believed to have joined the New Zealand Ministry of Foreign Affairs and Trade in late 1993, during which time he worked on the Africa Desk and subsequently worked for three months in New York as a junior New Zealand Foreign Ministry delegate to the United Nations General Assembly – this was also during the time that New Zealand was a member of the UN Security Council. On his return to New Zealand, Vitalis worked in the Ministry's Economic Division until he was posted to the New Zealand Embassy in Moscow as Second and then First Secretary followed (1997–1999), including a year's language training at the Moscow State Linguistic University (1996).

=== Russian Ministry of Agriculture, Turkmenistan and Uzbekistan ===
Vitalis then worked for a time at the Russian Ministry of Agriculture as part of a team developing a partial equilibrium model to assess the potential impact of Russia's accession to the World Trade Organization on its agricultural sector (1999–2000). Vitalis was an early advocate of the need to analyse Russia's agricultural policies at the federal and sub-federal level. He suggested that this was the only way to establish the full picture of Russian agricultural subsidisation a point reinforced in a paper he published on the subject. He also worked briefly during this period in Turkmenistan and Uzbekistan as an adviser on a range of diverse issues including currency reform and WTO accession.

=== Organisation for Economic Cooperation and Development, Paris, France ===
From 2001 to 2011, Vitalis worked in various roles at the OECD. Between 2001 and 2004 he worked in Paris for the OECD Secretariat as a Chief Adviser. In particular, he headed a unit charged with providing the analytical papers to support the Ministerial-level OECD Round Table on Sustainable Development. This influential body was chaired by the former New Zealand Minister for Environment and Associate Minister of Finance, Rt Hon Simon Upton. Ministers from a range of countries participated in Round Table meetings, including from France, the United Kingdom, the United States of America, Sweden, Canada, Italy, Japan, the Netherlands, Brazil and South Africa among others. The unique format of the Round Table also included leading NGOs, such as Greenpeace and WWF, alongside business organisations such as the World Business Council on Sustainable Development, Shell, BP and so on. The unit (which fluctuated in size from up to eight analysts) led by Vitalis and reporting to the Rt Hon Upton prepared a number of ground-breaking economic papers on a range of sustainability-related issues, including how to measure sustainable development, a set of measurements for a range of sustainable development-related issues, measuring embedded carbon flows (i.e. a consumption flow model); the potential synergies between investment flows and ODA, subsequently included as a chapter in a book published by the OECD and a controversial paper on the rise of eco-labels and their trade and environment-related effects. Together with Rt Hon Upton, Vitalis produced an economic analysis and a set of policy recommendations to address illegal, unreported and unregulated fishing on the high seas (IUU). This analysis ensured that Vitalis was included as an Economic Expert Adviser to the prestigious and high-level OECD IUU Ministerial Task Force (2004–05) and subsequently chaired the OECD Trade and Environment Committee (2008–to the present), including the OECD Global Forum on Trade and Climate Change (2009).

=== Ministry of Foreign Affairs and Trade, Wellington, New Zealand ===
Vitalis rejoined the New Zealand Ministry of Foreign Affairs and Trade in 2004 and worked in the Economics Division of the Ministry as the Head of the Trade and Economic Analysis Unit. He initially worked on a set of papers on international economic issues relevant to New Zealand as a way of informing the development of the Government's Growth and Innovation Framework. It is during this time that Vitalis is believed to have first advocated the development of a customs union between Australia and New Zealand – he is known to have opposed a currency union. He also proposed the establishment of a "Minister for Australia" to take this idea forward as a way to 'refresh' the Closer Economic Relationship between Australia and New Zealand in time for the twenty-fifth anniversary (in 2008) of the launch of that agreement.

Vitalis also managed the (general equilibrium) modelling work for the Joint Study assessing the potential benefits of the China-New Zealand Free Trade Agreement (FTA). He then transferred to the Trade Negotiations Division and became the investment chapter lead negotiator in the China-New Zealand FTA and the lead New Zealand negotiator for the treaty-status trade & labour, and trade & environment agreements between China and New Zealand, which were negotiated alongside the China-New Zealand FTA (2004–08). New Zealand was the first OECD country to conclude an FTA with China.

It was during this period that Vitalis contributed a chapter on the impact of OECD countries' trade policies on developing countries for a book edited by Robert Picciotto (former Director-General (Operations Evaluation) of the World Bank. He also published articles in The Journal of Integrative Environmental Sciences, including on the linkage between economics, science and sustainability and an assessment of the sustainable development effects of New Zealand's ground breaking agriculture reforms. In 2005, Vitalis contributed a chapter on the intersection between agricultural, trade and environmental policies to a book edited by Thomas Lines of the International Institute for Sustainable Development. The following year, Vitalis' work on agricultural reform and the impact of subsidies on both the economy and the environment formed the basis of a chapter in a book published by the OECD as part of its series on subsidy reform and sustainability.

Vitalis has been a senior New Zealand negotiator at the World Trade Organisation (WTO) including on trade and environment-related issues (2004–08). In particular, he is believed to have played an influential role in the WTO negotiations on environmental goods, including by chairing the 'Friends of Environmental Goods' process which collectively identified and tabled at the WTO more than 150 specific products as environmental goods (2004–07). The 'Friends' grouping included primarily OECD countries. Vitalis is also believed to have first proposed the innovative 'living list' concept also formally tabled at the WTO by New Zealand. Such a 'living' process would enable the regular updating of any list of products agreed at the WTO to ensure that the list keeps pace with the rapid evolution of environmental technologies. At the same time, a series of papers tabled by New Zealand at the WTO and also believed to have been written by Vitalis proposed the establishment of a Voluntary Consultative Mechanism (later, a Voluntary Consultative Process) as a Pareto optimal way to address the apparent intersection between trade measures contained in Multilateral Environmental Agreements and the WTO Agreements. It was during this time that Vitalis also produced his analysis of the relationship between trade, innovation and competition in the New Zealand context – a paper subsequently published by the OECD.

Vitalis was appointed New Zealand's Chief Negotiator for the ASEAN-Australia-New Zealand Free Trade Agreement (FTA) (AANZFTA; 2008–10). He was also appointed simultaneously to lead the Malaysia-New Zealand FTA (MNZFTA; 2009–10) negotiations which at that time had been stalled for over eighteen months. Vitalis successfully led the New Zealand teams which concluded both the AANZFTA and revived the moribund MNZFTA process such that less than six months later the MNZFTA was also concluded and came into force on 1 August 2009. The signing of the agreement with Malaysia took place in Kuala Lumpur and was overseen by the Malaysian and New Zealand Prime Ministers and a sixty-member New Zealand business delegation.

At the time of the conclusion of the AANZFTA and MNZFTA, ASEAN was New Zealand's third most important trading partner after Australia and China and Malaysia was New Zealand's eighth most important trading partner. The ground-breaking AANZFTA was the first agreement negotiated jointly by Australia and New Zealand. It is characterised by a range of WTO-plus commitments made by ASEAN in areas as diverse as goods, services and intellectual property rights. The agreement is also characterised by the innovative use of an 'economic cooperation' chapter explicitly designed to help ASEAN members effectively implement the agreement. In particular, with its 'built-in' agenda, the AANZFTA is a 'living agreement'. The deadline for the elimination of tariffs in the AANZFTA mirrors that of the China-New Zealand FTA, i.e. twelve years and is a significant improvement on the existing Thailand-New Zealand Closer Economic Partnership which eliminated tariffs on New Zealand products within twenty years. The Malaysia-New Zealand FTA contains a number of significantly AANZFTA-Plus provisions, not least the elimination of a 15% tariff on kiwifruit and a range of new services commitments ensuring that New Zealand education, engineering and environmental service providers have a 'first mover' advantage over their competitors ( and). Vitalis' leadership in successfully concluding the AANZFTA was specifically acknowledged by the then New Zealand Minister of Trade, Hon Tim Groser and during the New Zealand parliamentary debate on the ratification of the agreement itself. Vitalis also led the New Zealand AANZFTA 'roadshow' which promoted the opportunities presented by this plurilateral agreement to New Zealand stakeholders in all of the main centres of New Zealand.

=== New Zealand High Commission, Canberra, Australia (2009-2011) ===
Following the successful conclusion of AANZFTA, Vitalis was appointed the New Zealand Deputy High Commissioner in Canberra from 2009 to 2011, during which time he also completed the Malaysia-New Zealand FTA. The relationship with Australia is New Zealand's most significant and the High Commission is New Zealand's largest globally. Following the retirement of the High Commissioner, Dr John Larkindale, Vitalis was Acting High Commissioner from November 2010 to May 2011. His period as Acting High Commissioner coincided with Australian Prime Minister Gillard's historic address to the New Zealand Parliament and the Christchurch earthquake following which both then Prime Minister Gillard and Leader of the Opposition, Tony Abbot along with Foreign Minister Rudd were invited by Vitalis to the New Zealand High Commission in Canberra to sign the official condolence book for the victims of the earthquake in New Zealand's second largest city

In 2009–10, Vitalis was instrumental in t<he establishment by New Zealand of the Friends of Fossil Fuel Subsidy Reform (FFFSR) grouping. This non-G20 group of countries has two inter-related objectives: to support the G20's ambitions for reform and elimination of fossil fuel subsidies; and to support the need for greater transparency regarding the data for such subsidies. Vitalis spoke at the launch of the initiative in June 2010 and also at a GSI-UNEP-WTO Conference on the subject later that year. The FFFSR currently comprises Costa Rica, Denmark, Ethiopia, New Zealand, Norway, Switzerland and Sweden. The grouping has been active at APEC and the UNFCCC to advance its case that reform of fossil fuel subsidies can make a meaningful difference to both economic and environmental outcomes. In this regard, the FFFSR works closely with a leading NGO, the Global Subsidies Initiative based in Geneva. The initial meetings of the FFFSR were held in Paris to coincide with Vitalis' travel to Paris to chair the OECD Committee on Trade and Environment.

In 2010, Vitalis was invited to Manila by the Asian Development Bank to present a paper as part of its regional economic integration seminar series. The paper essentially argues that preferential trade agreements could in fact be drivers of meaningful liberalisation and thus integration and thus presents an intriguing reference point to the 'stumbling blocks' thesis posited by Bhagwati and others. He reprised a more elaborate version of this paper at a Boao Forum event in Beijing in December that year. There were strong rumours in mid to late 2010 that Vitalis had resigned from the New Zealand Foreign Ministry and had secured a senior role at the Asian Development Bank to work on regional economic integration.

=== New Zealand Mission to the European Union, Brussels (2011-2015) ===
In early 2011, Vitalis was appointed New Zealand Ambassador to the European Union in Brussels, with cross-accreditations as New Zealand Ambassador to NATO, Belgium, Bulgaria, Romania and Luxembourg. Vitalis is the first Greek-New Zealand Ambassador. He formally presented his letter of credentials as the New Zealand Ambassador to the European Union to President Van Rompuy on 15 November 2011 and to President Barroso on 23 December 2011. In late 2012, as a consequence of a restructuring in the New Zealand Ministry of Foreign Affairs and Trade and the closure of the New Zealand Embassy in Stockholm, Vitalis was appointed New Zealand's Ambassador to Sweden (located in Brussels), alongside his on-going responsibilities as New Zealand's Ambassador to the European Union and NATO. He presented his credentials in Stockholm in early 2013. Given the expansion of his responsibilities to include Sweden and the FTA with the Customs Union of Russia, Belarus and Kazakhstan (see below), Vitalis' accreditations to Belgium, Luxembourg, Romania and Bulgaria were transferred to the New Zealand Deputy Head of Mission to the EU in Brussels, Paula Wilson who became a full Ambassador to those countries.

Vitalis presented a paper at the World Agricultural Forum held in December 2011. His presentation emphasised the important linkages between trade, agriculture and development citing in particular the possibility of focusing development assistance including through the effective implementation of trade agreements as a mechanism to encourage and facilitate investment and trade flows. He made particular reference in his presentation to the ASEAN-Australia-New Zealand FTA which features assistance for implementation of the agreement in a manner designed to ensure that the benefits of the agreement are effectively harnessed across ASEAN member states.

In early 2012, Vitalis was formally appointed as New Zealand's Chief Negotiator for the Russia-Belarus-Kazakhstan-New Zealand FTA.

In early 2013, Vitalis was appointed as the New Zealand Minister of Trade's 'Special Envoy' in support of Hon Tim Groser's campaign to become WTO Director-General. As a Russian-language speaker Vitalis' focus during Minister Groser's campaign was on the WTO Members of the Commonwealth of Independent States. Vitalis is believed to have travelled to Armenia, Georgia, Kyrgyzstan, Moldova, the Russian Federation, Tajikistan and Uzbekistan where he lobbied those countries on behalf of the New Zealand Minister.

=== New Zealand Mission to Geneva, Switzerland (2015-2017) ===
Vangelis then served as New Zealand's Permanent Representative to the World Trade Organisation (WTO) in Geneva where he chaired the agriculture negotiations in a personal capacity. In this role he helped draft the text of the historic Nairobi WTO Ministerial Decision.

=== Chair of the APEC 2021 Senior Officials Meeting ===
On the fifth of March 2020, Vitalis was appointed Chair of the Senior Officials Meeting (SOM) during the New Zealand hosting of APEC in 2021. He would go on to state that hosting APEC was a definitive career highlight stating "I’m a genuinely big believer in the public good dimension of APEC, I think it’s a really important thing. And so for me, it’s without question the most exciting thing that I’ve done."

== Education ==
Vitalis is believed to have attended schools in England, Germany (Andreanum, Hannover), Fiji (Veiuto Primary School, Suva) and in New Zealand. (Intermediate Normal) where his batting for the third eleven cricket team is still remembered (Palmerston North Boys High School).Where he was well known for his extensive Pink Floyd record collection. He studied at Auckland University (where he was also the co-editor of the Student Association's controversial newspaper, Craccum, in 1993) and Harvard. In addition to English, Vitalis speaks German, Greek and Russian.

== Personal life ==
A Greek-New Zealander, Vitalis' parents emigrated to New Zealand in 1980. Vitalis is married to Tanya Jurado.
