= Malcolm Walker (cartoonist) =

New Zealand architect and cartoonist

Malcolm Walker (born 1950) is a New Zealand architect and cartoonist based in Auckland.

He has been an editorial cartoonist for the Sunday News for a number of years and his work also appears in other publications. Walker has won the 2001 and 2002 Cartoonist of the Year in the Qantas Media Awards.

== Selected bibliography ==
- Erratic Scratchings (1984) ISBN 086470013X
- Up and under! : rugby cartoons (1987) ISBN 047400290X
- Did you mean to do that? : Malcolm Walker architectural cartoons (2012) ISBN 9780473205898
