= Basque Park =

Park in Auckland, New Zealand

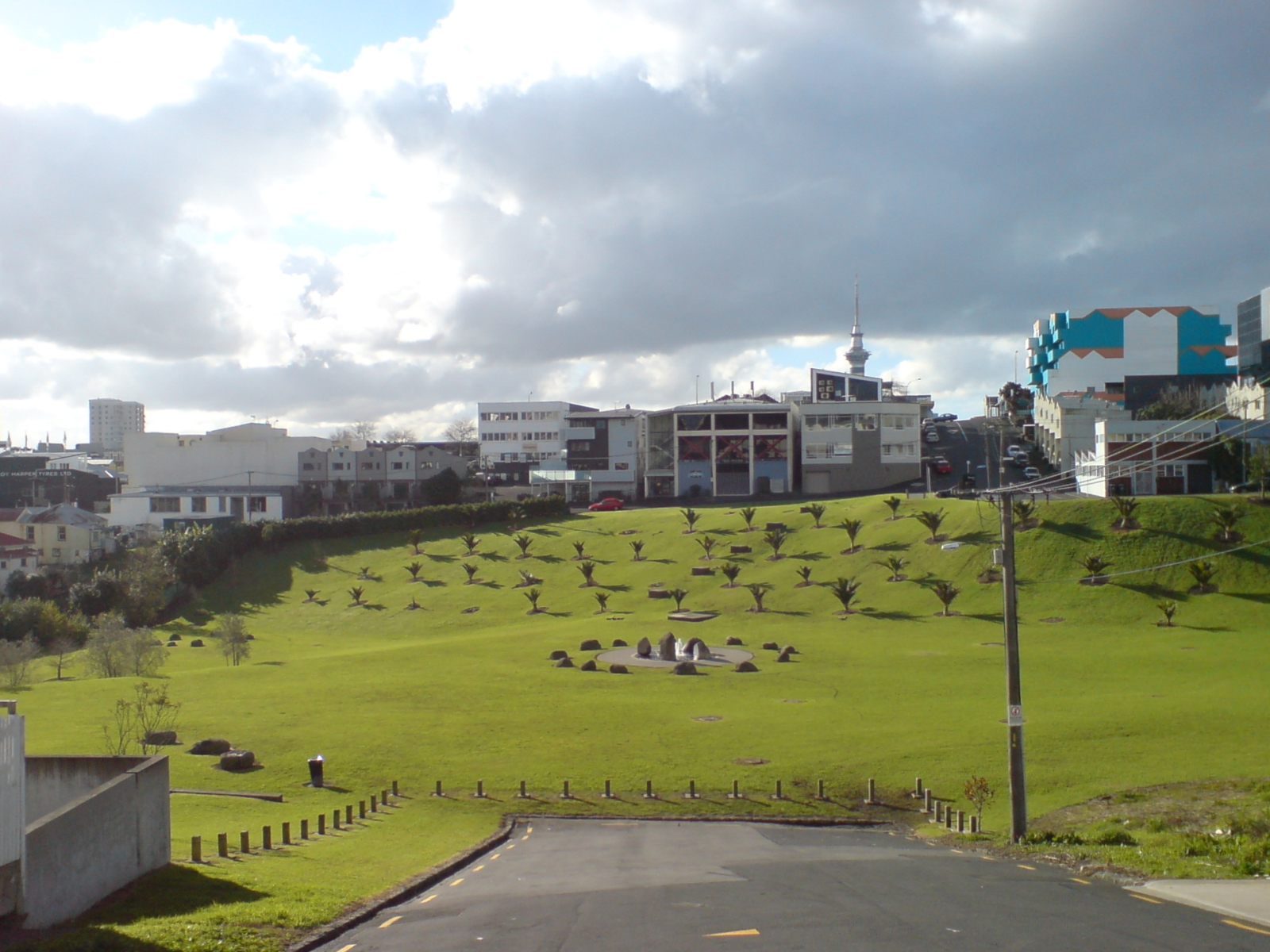
- Basque Park as viewed from Rendall Place.
- Interactive map of Basque Park
- Location: Eden Terrace, Auckland
- Coordinates: 36.864461°S 174.757501°E
- Operator: Auckland Council

Basque Park is a north-facing reserve in Eden Terrace, a former working class suburb in central Auckland, the largest city in New Zealand. It is surrounded by Symonds Street, Newton Road, New North Road and the North Western Motorway.

This green area was part of a group of important working class housing suburbs of New Zealand. Based in the most densely housed urban area in the country Basque Park served as a recreation area for the suburbs of Arch Hill and Newton.

== History ==
In the 1930s it was the intention of the city fathers to create a playground for children whose families were crowded in the gully between the Symonds Street and Great North Road ridges during the Depression where Eden Terrace, Arch Hill and Newton suburbs were found. Certain private owned sections of land were bequeathed to Auckland City Council also to be used as a recreation area.

Hard wood paving cobbles, that were originally used for roading on the waterfront of Auckland, were in the 1970s dumped on the eastern edge of the park in preparation to filling in a ramp that would carry a road through to Dominion and New North Road. One source states that the intention of the Auckland City Council was to build a fly-over of the Park. Because of Industrial zoning there was an uneasy co-existence between industry and housing. This is alluded to in copies of Flash, the Grey Lynn, Westmere, Newton Community newsletter/newspaper, of the late 1970s, when the reserve was to the southern edge of a wasteland of old housing that was deliberately allowed to decay so that the North Western Motorway could be put through without opposition.

In the late 1970s, once most of the housing was cleared out, the Auckland City Council moved to extend Upper Queen Street, the main street of the city through Basque Park to Dominion Road. Christodoulos Moisa, an artist and writer who lived in Fleet Street and was the Chairperson of the Newton branch of the Grey Lynn, Westmere and Newton Communities Committee, found out that the extension was going to be put through the bequeathed land and organised a campaign against this move. Enlisting the help of architect and lecturer at the School of Architecture, Vince Terrini, he worked with architecture students to come up with a proposal to save the reserve.

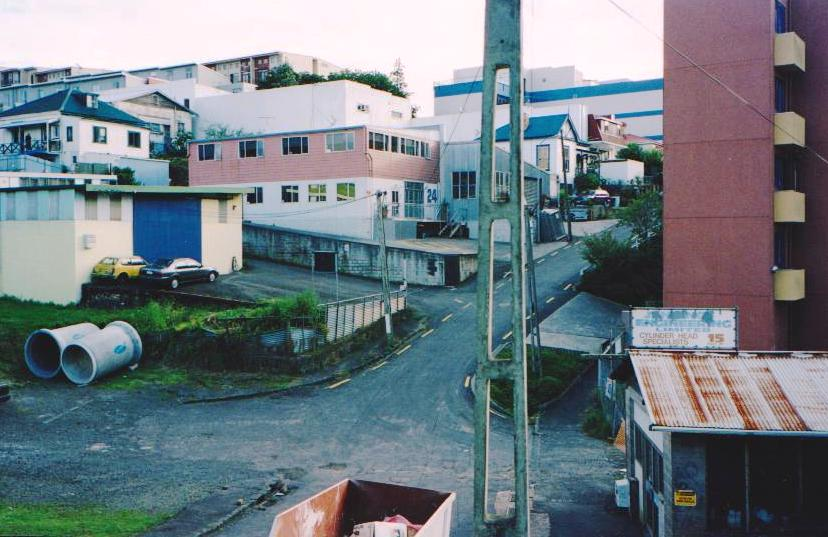
The Industrial enclave in Fleet Street, Eden Terrace, Auckland. Smiths and Jennings engineering were to the northern boundary of the Basque Park Reserve. Note the new residential flats on the right.

Moisa took the Auckland City Council to the Town Planning Tribunal where eventually Judge Turner ruled that the connection to Dominion Road should be diverted towards the north, circling around the Reserve. As a result, the area has now been re zoned for inner city housing and the few existing industrial workshops are in decline.

By the beginning of the 21st century the Basque Park Reserve has become a gentrified enclave which has been extensively landscaped and planted with nīkau palms and other trees. This is to the chagrin of some of the locals who had planted a community garden in the area during the period when the Auckland City Council did very little maintenance in the area.
