= 1992 Wellington City Council election =

Local election in New Zealand

- 10 October 1992
	First party	Second party	Third party
Party	Citizens'	Labour	Green
Last election	9	8	1
Seats won	8	6	5
Seat change	▼1	▼2	▲4
- Results by ward, shaded by highest polling party/candidate vote share

The 1992 Wellington City Council election was part of the 1992 New Zealand local elections, to elect members to sub-national councils and boards. The polling was conducted using the first-past-the-post electoral method.

== Council ==
The Wellington City Council consisted of a mayor and twenty-one councillors elected from seven wards (Eastern, Lambton, Northern, Onslow, Southern, Tawa, Western).

=== Mayor ===
1992 Wellington mayoral election
Party	Candidate	Votes	%	±%
Labour	Fran Wilde	18,795	32.91	
Independent	Helene Ritchie	9,715	17.00	−10.12
Citizens'	Ken Comber	8,751	15.31	
Green	Stephen Rainbow	6,122	10.71	
Independent	Ruth Gotlieb	5,851	10.23	
Independent	David Bull	4,683	8.19	−0.12
Independent	Rana Waitai	2,607	4.56	
McGillicuddy Serious	John Morrison	299	0.52	−1.41
Private Enterprise	Frank Moncur	134	0.23	−0.15
Communist League	Patrick Brown	112	0.19	
Independent	Margaret Barry-Gellen	88	0.15	
Informal votes		632	1.10	−1.54
Majority		9,080	15.88	
Turnout		57,157	53.26	+3.32
Registered electors		108,505		

=== Eastern Ward ===
The Eastern Ward returned four councillors to the Wellington City Council. The final results for the ward were:

Eastern Ward
Party	Candidate	Votes	%	±%
Independent	Ruth Gotlieb	5,916	58.50	−5.01
Green	Sue Kedgley	5,721	56.57	
Citizens'	Brian Barraclough	4,531	44.80	+2.55
Labour	Hazel Armstrong	4,179	41.32	
Citizens'	Rama Ramanathan	3,451	34.12	−3.26
Citizens'	Kathryn Olsen	3,321	32.84	
Citizens'	Heather Thompson	3,289	32.52	
Green	Lorna Sandeman	3,150	31.15	
Labour	Richard Young	3,045	30.11	
Labour	Mary Sinclair	2,917	28.84	
Private Enterprise	Frank Moncur	928	9.17	+4.97
Informal votes		286	2.82	+1.09
Turnout		10,112	47.43	+0.58
Registered electors		21,316		

=== Lambton Ward ===
The Lambton Ward returned three councillors to the Wellington City Council. The final results for the ward were:

Lambton Ward
Party	Candidate	Votes	%	±%
Green	Stephen Rainbow	3,857	60.49	+18.45
Green	Liz Thomas	2,331	36.55	
Citizens'	Rex Nicholls	2,266	35.53	
Citizens'	Russell Armitage	1,948	30.55	−12.30
Labour	Tony Burton	1,780	27.91	
Green	Myra Giese	1,601	25.10	
Citizens'	Grahame Anderson	1,556	24.40	
Labour	Barbara Buckett	1,434	22.49	
Labour	Peter Cleave	919	14.41	
Independent	William MacQueen	830	13.01	
Capital Action	Ann Nolan	606	9.50	
Informal votes		284	4.45	+1.38
Turnout		6,376	43.43	+4.14
Registered electors		14,681		

=== Northern Ward ===
The Northern Ward returned three councillors to the Wellington City Council. The final results for the ward were:

Northern Ward
Party	Candidate	Votes	%	±%
Citizens'	Sarah Lysaght	3,769	52.88	−9.70
Independent	Ian Hutchings	3,314	46.49	+9.88
Labour	Ken Boyden	3,263	45.78	−0.46
Green	Anne Duncan	2,591	36.35	
Citizens'	Richard Nanson	2,497	35.03	
Labour	Jill Main	2,492	34.96	
Citizens'	Kenneth Tocker	2,346	32.91	
Labour	Vita Harmor	1,110	15.57	
Informal votes		254	3.56	−0.44
Turnout		7,127	47.27	+2.41
Registered electors		15,077		

=== Onslow Ward ===
The Onslow Ward returned two councillors to the Wellington City Council. The final results for the ward were:

Onslow Ward
Party	Candidate	Votes	%	±%
Independent	David Bull	3,392	58.45	
Citizens'	Sally Baber	2,565	44.20	−20.46
Citizens'	Les Stephens	2,518	43.39	−12.45
Green	Martin Wilson	1,516	26.12	
Capital Action	Colin Cloverdale	692	11.92	
Independent	Bob Monks	682	11.75	−13.81
Independent	Alexander Schiff	241	4.15	
Informal votes		246	4.23	+0.37
Turnout		5,803	53.74	+1.38
Registered electors		10,797		

=== Southern Ward ===
The Southern Ward returned four councillors to the Wellington City Council. The final results for the ward were:

Southern Ward
Party	Candidate	Votes	%	±%
Labour	Peter Parussini	4,894	53.98	
Labour	John Gilberthorpe	4,599	50.72	+1.05
Labour	Margaret Bonner	4,422	48.77	
Green	Merrin Downing	4,051	44.68	+6.21
Labour	Tala Cleverley	3,997	44.08	−2.46
Green	Celia Wade-Brown	3,310	36.51	
Independent	Eddie Mollier	2,178	24.02	
Independent	Alan Chambers	2,093	23.08	
Citizens'	Mary Bishop	1,950	21.50	
Citizens'	Mulitalo Mano'o	1,716	18.92	
Alliance	Chris Ellis	1,543	17.01	+6.73
Alliance	Beverly Arnell	1,514	16.69	
Informal votes		388	4.27	−0.69
Turnout		9,086	42.96	
Registered electors		21,147		

=== Tawa Ward ===
The Tawa Ward returned two councillors to the Wellington City Council. The final results for the ward were:

Tawa Ward (2 vacancies)
Party	Candidate	Votes	%	±%
Independent	Kerry Prendergast	Unopposed		
Independent	David Watt	Unopposed		
Registered electors		8,911		

=== Western Ward ===
The Western Ward returned three councillors to the Wellington City Council. The final results for the ward were:

Western Ward
Party	Candidate	Votes	%	±%
Independent	Val Bedingfield	5,008	61.50	−5.81
Citizens'	Bryan Weyburne	3,343	41.05	
Citizens'	Andy Foster	2,910	35.74	
Green	Sheila Ahern	2,637	32.38	
Citizens'	Alfie Des Tombe	2,320	28.49	
Capital Action	Colin Robertson	1,997	24.52	
Green	James Shaw	1,820	22.35	
Labour	Frank Mackinnon	1,788	21.96	
Green	Alexander Ewing	1,553	19.07	
Capital Action	Ashley Lewis	1,050	12.89	
Informal votes		380	4.66	+2.78
Turnout		8,143	50.56	−0.43
Registered electors		16,103		

== Results of the city council election ==
Following the 1992 Wellington City Council election, the composition of the council was as follows:

=== Summary ===
Ward	Previous	Elected
Mayor	Jim Belich	Fran Wilde
Eastern Ward	Ruth Gotlieb	Ruth Gotlieb
Eastern Ward	Les Paske	Sue Kedgley
Eastern Ward	Nic Dalton	Brian Barraclough
Eastern Ward	Brian Barraclough	Hazel Armstrong
Lambton Ward	Russell Armitage	Stephen Rainbow
Lambton Ward	Stephen Rainbow	Liz Thomas
Lambton Ward	Terry McDavitt	Rex Nicholls
Northern Ward	Sarah Lysaght	Sarah Lysaght
Northern Ward	Ken Boyden	Ian Hutchings
Northern Ward	Ian Hutchings	Ken Boyden
Onslow Ward	Sally Baber	David Bull
Onslow Ward	Les Stephens	Sally Baber
Southern Ward	Margaret Bonner	Peter Parussini
Southern Ward	John Gilberthorpe	John Gilberthorpe
Southern Ward	Tala Cleverley	Margaret Bonner
Southern Ward	Merrin Downing	Merrin Downing
Tawa Ward	David Watt	Kerry Prendergast
Tawa Ward	Kerry Prendergast	David Watt
Western Ward	Val Bedingfield	Val Bedingfield
Western Ward	Anna Weir	Bryan Weyburne
Western Ward	Sue Driver	Andy Foster

== Other local elections ==
=== Wellington Regional Council – Wellington Ward ===
The Wellington ward returned five councillors to the Wellington Regional Council.

Wellington Ward
Party	Candidate	Votes	%	±%
Independent	Sue Driver	27,963	63.76	
Citizens'	Ian Lawrence	26,162	59.65	
Green	Denis Foot	25,634	58.45	
Labour	Terry McDavitt	20,406	46.53	
Citizens'	Les Paske	19,034	43.40	
Citizens'	Euan McQueen	14,077	32.10	
Citizens'	James Cornish	13,080	29.82	
Citizens'	Jim Rowe	12,837	29.27	
Labour	Peter Graham	12,166	27.74	
Labour	Robert Logan	11,607	26.46	
Labour	Patrick McLean	9,655	22.01	
Alliance	Dallas Moore	8,014	18.27	
Alliance	Vernon Tile	6,676	15.22	
Alliance	Ron England	6,583	15.01	
Alliance	Simon Leys	5,368	12.24	
Informal votes		4,736	10.79	
Turnout		43,856	40.41	
Registered electors		108,505		
