= Wellington-Karori =

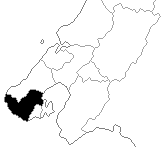
Wellington-Karori electorate boundaries between 1993 and 1996

Wellington-Karori is a former New Zealand parliamentary electorate in the Wellington region, which existed for one parliamentary term from 1993 to 1996, and was held by Pauline Gardiner. In 1995, Gardiner defected from National to United New Zealand.

== Population centres ==
Based on the 1991 New Zealand census, an electoral redistribution was carried out. This resulted in the abolition of nine electorates, and the creation of eleven new electorates. Through an amendment in the Electoral Act in 1965, the number of electorates in the South Island was fixed at 25, so the new electorates increased the number of the North Island electorates by two. In the South Island, one electorate was abolished and one electorate was recreated. In the North Island, five electorates were newly created (including Wellington-Karori), five electorates were recreated, and eight electorates were abolished.

The electorate covered the central section and some suburbs of the city of Wellington. Polling booths were in Chartwell, Wellington Central, Crofton Downs, Highbury, Karori, Kelburn, Khandallah, Mākara, Ngaio, Northland, Thorndon, Wadestown, and Wilton.

== History ==
The electorate was represented by Pauline Gardiner during the three years of its existence, from the 1993 election to 1996.

Gardiner had contested the Wellington Central electorate for the National Party in the 1990 election against Fran Wilde, the incumbent of the Labour Party. On election night, Gardiner had a lead, but Wilde won when the special votes had been counted. Wilde was elected Mayor of Wellington in 1992, and her resignation from parliament caused the 1992 Wellington Central by-election. Gardiner was beaten by Labour's Chris Laidlaw by a vote margin of just over 1%. In the 1993 election, Gardiner in turn defeated Laidlaw when they contested the new Wellington-Karori electorate. In 1995, Gardiner left the National Party to join six other MPs in the establishment of United New Zealand, a centrist party. Like all United MPs but Peter Dunne, she was defeated in the 1996 election; she contested the Wellington Central electorate, where she came fourth.

=== Members of Parliament ===
Key

National United NZ

Election	Winner
1993 election	Pauline Gardiner^{1}
(Electorate abolished in 1996; see Wellington Central)

^{1}Pauline Gardiner defected to United New Zealand in 1995.

== Election results ==
=== 1993 election ===
1993 general election: Wellington-Karori
Party	Candidate	Votes	%	±%
National	Pauline Gardiner	10,537	43.95	
Labour	Chris Laidlaw	10,057	41.95	
Alliance	Danna Glendining	2,181	9.10	
NZ First	Richard Bramwell	654	2.73	
Christian Heritage	David Harris	230	0.96	
McGillicuddy Serious	Angela Millen	215	0.90	
Natural Law	Ian George Douglas	99	0.41	
Majority		480	2.00	
Informal votes		590	2.40	
Turnout		24,563	91.70	
Registered electors		26,786		
