= 1992 Wellington mayoral election =

New Zealand local election

- 10 October 1992
- Turnout: 57,157 (53.26%)
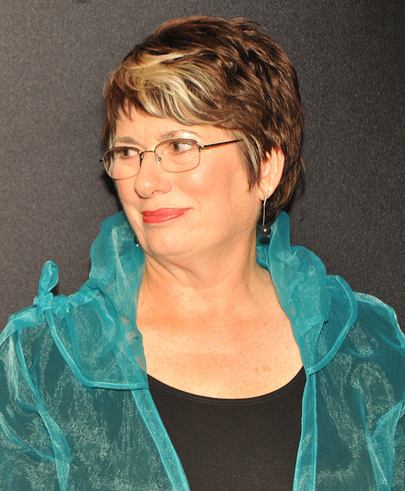

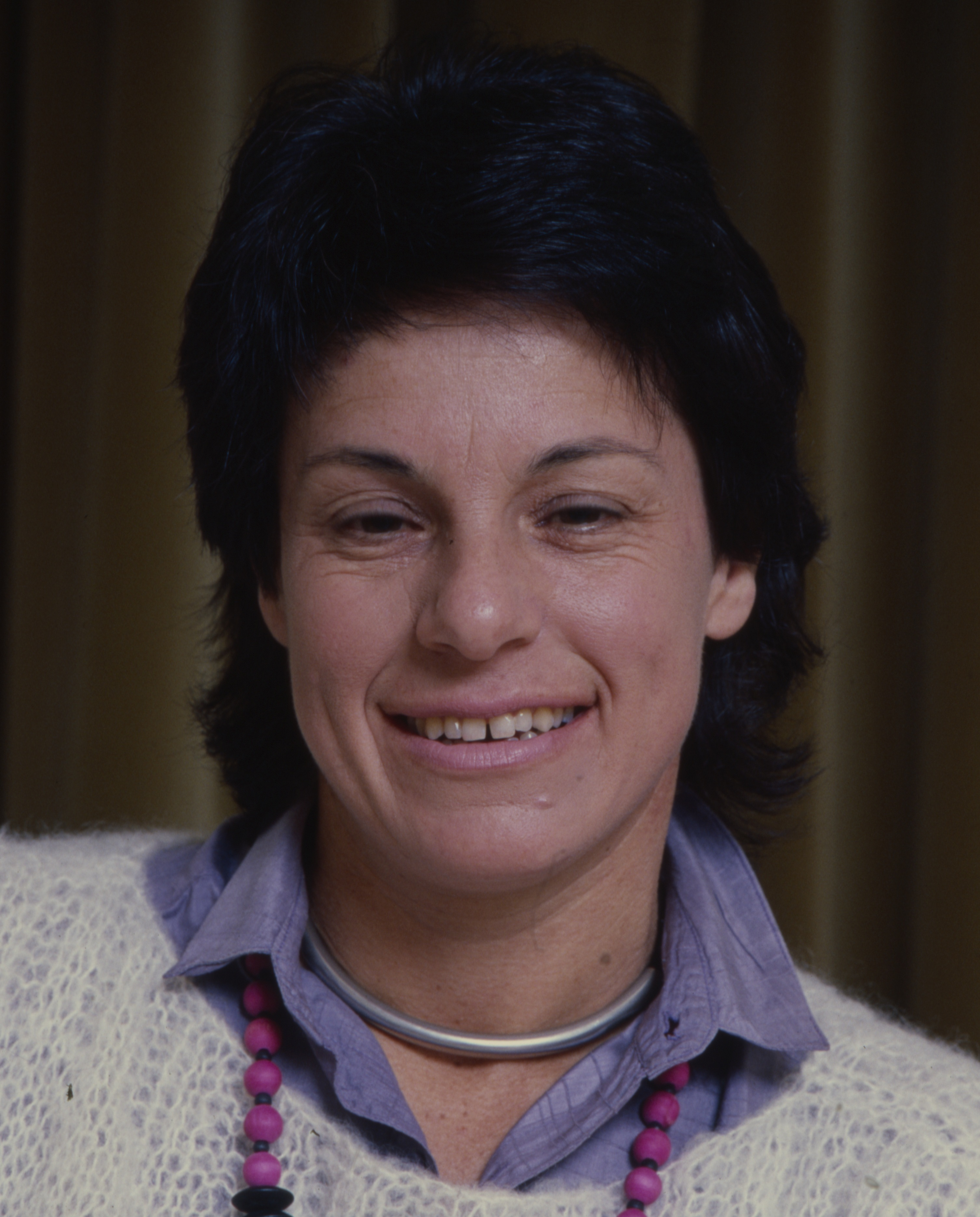

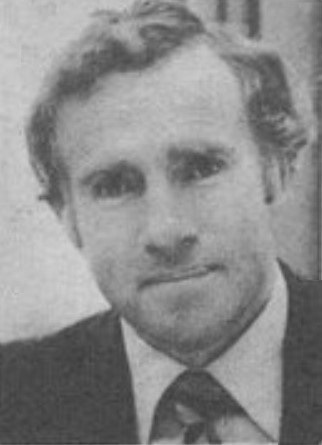

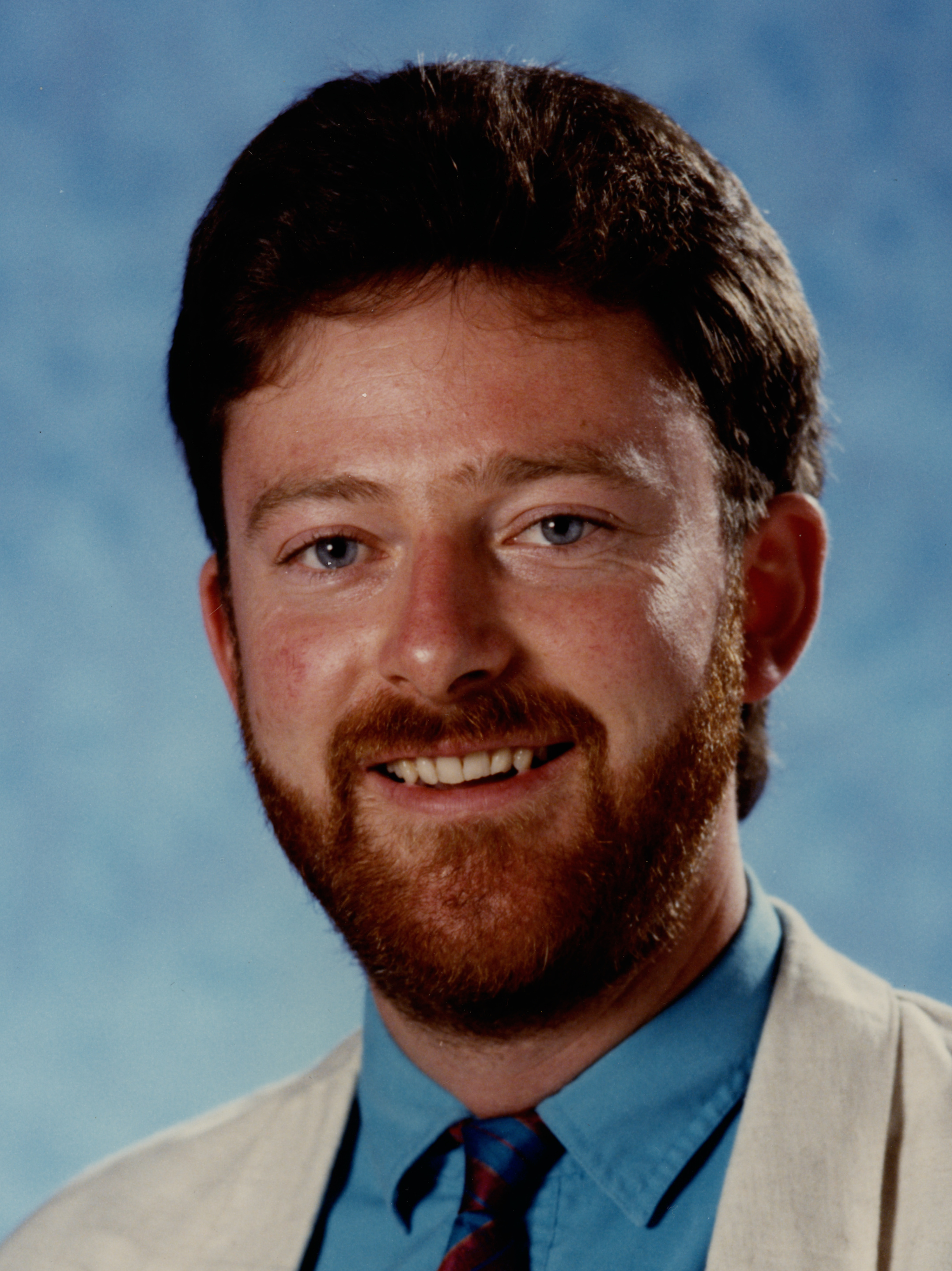
Candidate	Fran Wilde	Helene Ritchie
Party	Labour	Independent
Popular vote	18,795	9,715
Percentage	32.91%	17.00%
Candidate	Ken Comber	Stephen Rainbow
Party	Citizens'	Green
Popular vote	8,751	6,122
Percentage	15.31%	10.71%
Mayor before election
Sir Jim Belich
Labour
Elected mayor
Fran Wilde
Labour

The 1992 Wellington mayoral election was part of the New Zealand local elections held that same year. In 1992, elections were held for the Mayor of Wellington plus other local government roles including 21 councillors. The polling was conducted using the standard first-past-the-post electoral method.

The election saw Fran Wilde, the MP for Wellington Central, elected as the new mayor of Wellington replacing incumbent Sir Jim Belich who had retired after serving two terms. Wilde became Wellington's first female mayor, defeating former Deputy Mayor Helene Ritchie and her predecessor as MP for Wellington Central Ken Comber who ran for the Citizens' Association.

== Background ==
In November 1991, former Deputy Mayor Helene Ritchie, was the first person to declare their candidacy. The next day incumbent mayor, Sir Jim Belich, made inferences that he was considering standing for a third term. He would not rule out standing for re-election, but stated he would not make a final decision until February. This was a surprise given Belich stated when he was first elected in 1986 that he wished to serve for only two terms. Ultimately Belich cited this pledge as his main reason when he decided not to stand again. He stated "I said if I couldn't do in six years what was in my power to do I'm not sure I could do more in nine. The main things on my agenda, formed after my election, have been done."

Following Belich's decision to retire from the mayoralty, the Labour Party chose Wellington Central MP Fran Wilde as their candidate. Initially Eastern Ward councillor Nic Dalton was favoured to replace Belich though Dalton ruled himself out of contention for both the mayoralty and council. Attention then turned to Wilde's status as an MP with the prospect of her taking both a parliamentary and mayoral salary or the prospect of a by-election at taxpayer expense. Labour leader Mike Moore made known his preference for Wilde to remain in Parliament, offering to relieve her of portfolios to help with workload, although Wilde ultimately decided to resign from Parliament if elected mayor.

The Citizens' Association had no shortage of people interested in being their mayoral candidate. Citizens' leader on the council Les Stephens, Eastern ward councillor Ruth Gotlieb, former councillor Bryan Weyburne, ex-deputy mayor Gavin Wilson and previous mayor Ian Lawrence were all approached by the selection committee. Insurance executive Boyd Klap, broadcaster Sharon Crosbie, management executive Basil Logan as well as two former National Party MPs, Ken Comber and Tony Friedlander, also spoke to Citizens' selectors. Five names (Comber, Gotlieb, Lawrence, Stephens and Weyburne) went forward for the final selection panel. The association made a surprise choice, choosing Comber as their candidate for mayor. Gotlieb ran for mayor and council regardless as an independent. Stephens in the Onslow ward, Weyburne ran in the Western ward and Lawrence for the Wellington Regional Council. Former Citizens' councillor David Bull ran for mayor again after breaking withe the ticket in 1989.

== Results ==
The following table gives the election results:

1992 Wellington mayoral election
Party	Candidate	Votes	%	±%
Labour	Fran Wilde	18,795	32.91	
Independent	Helene Ritchie	9,715	17.00	−10.12
Citizens'	Ken Comber	8,751	15.31	
Green	Stephen Rainbow	6,122	10.71	
Independent	Ruth Gotlieb	5,851	10.23	
Independent	David Bull	4,683	8.19	−0.12
Independent	Rana Waitai	2,607	4.56	
McGillicuddy Serious	John Morrison	299	0.52	−1.41
Private Enterprise	Frank Moncur	134	0.23	−0.15
Communist League	Patrick Brown	112	0.19	
Independent	Margaret Barry-Gellen	88	0.15	
Informal votes		632	1.10	−1.54
Majority		9,080	15.88	
Turnout		57,157	53.26	+3.32

=== Results by ward ===
Fran Wilde polled the highest in all seven of Wellington's electoral wards.

Wards won by Wilde

	Fran Wilde		Helene Ritchie		Ken Comber		Stephen Rainbow		Others		Total
Ward	#	%	#	%	#	%	#	%	#	%	#
Eastern	3,246	28.1	2,200	19.0	1,909	16.5	1,125	9.7	3,093	26.7	11,573
Lambton	3,035	43.2	737	10.5	1,020	14.5	1,015	14.4	1,221	17.4	7,028
Northern	2,295	29.0	1,810	22.9	1,006	12.7	634	8.0	2,160	27.4	7,905
Onslow	2,151	34.0	838	13.2	1,101	17.4	600	9.5	1,644	25.9	6,334
Tawa	1,153	24.6	928	19.8	856	18.3	377	8.1	1,366	29.2	4,680
Southern	3,856	37.0	1,909	18.3	1,260	12.1	1,308	12.5	2,096	20.1	10,429
Western	3,041	33.1	1,291	14.0	1,597	17.4	1,060	11.5	2,211	24.0	9,200
Total	18,795	32.9	9,715	17.0	8,751	15.3	6,122	10.7	13,774	24.1	57,157

== Ward results ==
Candidates were also elected from wards to the Wellington City Council.

Party/ticket	Councillors
Citizens'	6
Labour	5
Greens	4
Independent	6

== See also ==
- 1992 Wellington Central by-election
