= Chris Laidlaw =

New Zealand politician and sportsman

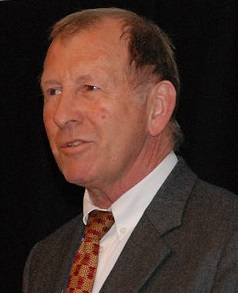
- Laidlaw in 2007

Chair of the Wellington Regional Council
- In office 30 June 2015 – 13 October 2019
- Preceded by: Fran Wilde
- Succeeded by: Daran Ponter

Member of the New Zealand Parliament for Wellington Central
- In office 12 December 1992 – 6 November 1993
- Preceded by: Fran Wilde
- Succeeded by: seat abolished

Race Relations Conciliator
- In office 1989–1992
- Preceded by: Wally Hirsh
- Succeeded by: John Clarke

Personal details
- Born: 16 November 1943 (age 83) Dunedin, New Zealand
- Party: Labour
- Relations: Sue Kedgley (sister-in-law)
- Education: University of Otago
- Height: 1.75 m (5 ft 9 in)
- Weight: 78 kg (172 lb)
- School: King's High School

Rugby union career
- Position: Halfback
Amateur team(s)
Years	Team	Apps	(Points)
1962–1966	Otago University		(0)
1969	Oxford University		(0)
Provincial / State sides
Years	Team	Apps	(Points)
1962–1967	Otago	47	(18)
1968	Canterbury	1	(0)
International career
Years	Team	Apps	(Points)
1963–1970	New Zealand	20	(12)

Christopher Robert Laidlaw (born 16 November 1943) is a New Zealand politician and former rugby union player, Rhodes Scholar, public servant, diplomat and radio host.

== Early life ==
Laidlaw was born in Dunedin and schooled at King's High School from 1957 to 1961, where he played in the first rugby team.

Laidlaw attended Otago University from 1962 to 1966, and completed a master's degree in 1968, after which he went overseas with the All Blacks. In 1969 he took up his Rhodes Scholarship at Merton College, Oxford.

== Rugby union career ==
Described as a rugby prodigy, Laidlaw was immediately selected for the University A side in 1962 upon leaving school. Such was the impact of his play that during the same year he played for an Otago representative side, for a South Island regional side, and for New Zealand Universities. Personal training sessions with former All Black Charlie Saxton endowed Laidlaw with "a marvellous pass and an accurate kick from forward base".

Not yet 20, Laidlaw made his debut for the All Blacks in 1963 on their tour of Britain and France. Although chosen as reserve to the incumbent half-back and vice-captain, Kevin Briscoe, Laidlaw's performances catapulted him into selection for a test against France and a match against the Barbarians.

In all, Laidlaw played 57 matches for the All Blacks, including 20 internationals. He captained the team on three occasions: a test against Australia in 1969 and games against Victoria and South-West Africa in 1969 and 1970, respectively.

== Civil servant ==
In 1972 Laidlaw joined the Ministry of Foreign Affairs. He served as Assistant to Commonwealth Secretary-General Sonny Ramphal who he described in 1999 as "far and away the most brilliant man I have ever met."

In 1977 during a diplomatic cocktail party in New York Laidlaw says the then NZ Prime Minister Robert Muldoon drunkenly harassed him, jabbing his finger in Laidlaw's chest. Muldoon was angry about Laidlaw's public comments criticising apartheid. Laidlaw says he grabbed Muldoon by the lapels and propelled him against the wall saying something like "If you ever touch me again I'll knock your teeth out." Muldoon glared at him, turned on his heel and walked out.

In 1986, Laidlaw became New Zealand's first resident High Commissioner to Harare, representing New Zealand's interests throughout Africa. In 1989, Laidlaw was appointed Race Relations Conciliator.

== Political career ==
=== Member of Parliament ===
New Zealand Parliament
Years	Term	Electorate	Party
1992–1993	43rd	Wellington Central	Labour

Laidlaw won the Wellington Central by-election in 1992, following the election of Fran Wilde to the Wellington mayoralty. Labour leader Mike Moore designated Laidlaw Labour's spokesman for Tourism, Disarmament and Ethnic Affairs. He failed to win re-election (to the renamed Wellington-Karori electorate) in the 1993 general election, losing to National's Pauline Gardiner.

Laidlaw is a supporter of a New Zealand republic. In 1997 he published remarks allegedly made to him by Prince Charles during his visit of that year, which appeared to show the Prince implicitly supports a New Zealand republic. Laidlaw later published the claim in his book Rights of Passage, and again in his The New Zealand Herald column in March 2005, during Prince Charles' visit. No comment was made by the Prince as to the veracity of the comments.

=== Wellington regional councillor ===
Laidlaw was a councillor and chair of the Wellington Regional Council and represented the Wellington constituency. He was elected at the 2007 local elections with 24,757 votes, the greatest number of votes for any candidate that year. He was re-elected in 2010 with 24,838 votes, in 2013 and in 2016. He succeeded Fran Wilde as chair of the Regional Council in 2015 and was re-elected as chair in 2016. Laidlaw came under significant pressure over changes made to the Wellington bus network in July 2018. When he stated to a parliamentary select committee that "there was essentially nothing they would do differently if they could do the bus overhaul again", the packed audience responded with loud laughter. The media subsequently adopted the term "bustastrophe" for the situation.

In July 2019 Laidlaw announced that he would not be standing for re-election to the Wellington Regional Council in the October 2019 local elections. Following the 2019 election Laidlaw was succeeded as chair by Daran Ponter of the Labour Party.

== Broadcasting ==
Laidlaw hosted Radio New Zealand National's Sunday Morning programme from 2000 to 2013.

== Family ==
Laidlaw is married to prominent New Zealand art curator Helen Kedgley, and is a brother-in-law of former Green MP Sue Kedgley. He has two children and three grandchildren.

== World Rugby Hall of Fame ==
Laidlaw was one of five people inducted into the World Rugby Hall of Fame at the World Rugby Awards in Monaco on 24 November 2024.

New Zealand Parliament
Preceded by Fran Wilde	Member of Parliament for Wellington Central; 1992–1993	Vacant Constituency abolished, recreated in 1996 Title next held by Richard Prebble
Political offices
Preceded by Fran Wilde	Chair of the Wellington Regional Council; 2015–2019	Succeeded by Daran Ponter
