= Pauline Gardiner =

New Zealand politician (born 1947)

Pauline Mona Gardiner (née Wayman, born 27 September 1947) is a former New Zealand Member of Parliament, first for the New Zealand National Party and then for United New Zealand. She was married to soldier, writer and public servant Wira Gardiner.

== Early life ==
Pauline Wayman was born in Christchurch in 1947. She received her education at New Brighton School (1952–1960) and Christchurch West High School (1961–1963). After school, she joined the New Zealand Women's Royal Army Corps (NZWRAC) for three years.

== Member of Parliament ==
New Zealand Parliament
Years	Term	Electorate	Party
1993–1995	44th	Wellington-Karori	National
1995–1996	Changed allegiance to:		United NZ

Gardiner contested the Wellington Central electorate for National in the 1990 election against Fran Wilde, the incumbent of the Labour Party. On election night, Gardiner had a lead, but Wilde won when the special votes had been counted.

Wilde was elected Mayor of Wellington in 1992, and her resignation from parliament caused the 1992 Wellington Central by-election. Gardiner again contested the seat, but was beaten by Labour's Chris Laidlaw.

In the 1993 election, Gardiner in turn defeated Laidlaw in the new Wellington-Karori electorate. This was the only seat Labour lost at this election, which allowed National to govern with a majority of one. In 1995, Gardiner left the National Party to join six other MPs in the establishment of centrist party United New Zealand. Like all United MPs but Peter Dunne, she was defeated in the 1996 election; she contested the Wellington Central electorate, where she came fourth.

In 1998 she ran for United in the Taranaki-King Country by election following the resignation of Jim Bolger. She came a distant ninth place with less than 1% of the votes.

== Interest outside parliament ==
Gardiner is most well known for her campaign against drug abuse. She is particularly critical of New Zealand's harm minimisation policy, which was introduced in 1990, and during this time, the country has become one of the highest users of drugs.

== Family ==
Gardiner has three children by her former husband Wira Gardiner. Their daughter Ainsley Gardiner is a film producer who became well known through her 2010 film Boy. She now lives in Whakatāne. She is now married to real estate agent Gordon Fridge.
