= Wira Gardiner =

New Zealand public servant (1943–2022)

Sir Wira Gardiner KNZM
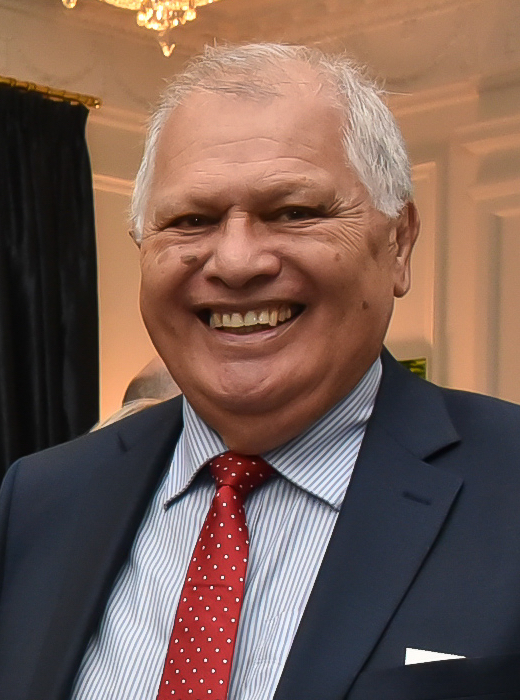
- Gardiner in 2021
- Born: Harawira Tiri Gardiner; 4 September 1943; Whakatāne, New Zealand
- Died: 17 March 2022 (aged 78); Gisborne, New Zealand
- Education: University of Canterbury; King's College London
- Occupations: Soldier, public servant and writer
- Political party: National
- Spouses: Pauline Gardiner; Hekia Parata
- Children: 5
- Relatives: Ainsley Gardiner (daughter)

Sir Harawira Tiri Gardiner KNZM (4 September 1943 – 17 March 2022) was a New Zealand soldier, public servant, and writer. He was Māori, of Ngāti Awa, Ngāti Pikiao, Whakatōhea, and Te Whānau-ā-Apanui descent.

== Early life and personal ==
Gardiner was born on 4 September 1943 in Whakatāne. He was brought up under whāngai, the Māori custom of open inner family adoption. He received his secondary education in Whakatane and his tertiary education at the University of Canterbury (BA) and at King's College London (MA War Studies). Gardiner was married to former member of parliament Hekia Parata. They had two children together and Gardiner had three other children from a previous marriage to former member of parliament Pauline Gardiner, including the film producer Ainsley Gardiner.

== Career ==
=== Military career ===
For twenty years Gardiner served in the New Zealand Army as a professional soldier. He saw active service in South Vietnam. He retired from the army in 1983 at the rank of lieutenant colonel; at the time he was the army's highest-ranked Māori officer.

=== Public service ===
Gardiner's public service career spanned 38 years from 1983 to 2021. During that time he was founding director of the Waitangi Tribunal, the founding (and only) General Manager of the Iwi Transition Agency and the founding chief executive of the Ministry of Māori Development (Te Puni Kokiri). He was also National Director of Civil Defence, chair of Te Mangai Paho, and deputy chairman of Te Ohu Kaimoana, the trust responsible for advancing the interests of iwi in the development of fisheries. He was the fourth ministerial appointee to the council of Te Wananga o Aotearoa, and deputy chair of council at Te Whare Wananga o Awanuiarangi.

Gardiner was chair of the Tertiary Education Commission from May 2010 to July 2012. On 1 July 2009, Gardiner was appointed to the board of the Museum of New Zealand Te Papa Tongarewa, and the following year, he was named as board chair.

Gardiner was appointed acting chief executive of Oranga Tamariki in 2021 following the resignation of Gráinne Moss, in an attempt to restore confidence in the agency following the 2019 controversy over the uplifting of Māori babies from their families.

=== Political career ===
Gardiner was a member of the National Party and for a period chaired the party's Wellington Central electorate committee. In 1984, he stood for selection in the East Cape electorate after Duncan MacIntyre retired. Unsuccessful, he tried again ahead of the 1987 general election and was selected. At the election he was defeated by the incumbent Labour Party MP Anne Fraser.

=== Writing career ===
Gardiner published a number of books on topics related to New Zealand history and the Māori world, including the 28th Māori Battalion, race relations in New Zealand, a biography of politician Parekura Horomia and the art form of haka. He also published a book in response to Jim Bolger's government's “fiscal envelope” cap on Treaty of Waitangi settlements, which would have limited compensation for all Māori claims to $1 billion.

== Illness and death ==
In 2012, Gardiner was hospitalised with suspected pancreatic cancer but was discharged after five days with a clean bill of health.

Following Hekia Parata's retirement from Parliament in 2016, Prime Minister John Key suggested that Parata had resigned because of Gardiner's ill-health, something which Parata refuted, saying that Gardiner was healthy.

In October 2021 Gardiner resigned his role as acting chief executive of Oranga Tamariki because of an illness, later reported to be a brain tumor. He believed his brain tumor was connected to Agent Orange exposure during his military service in Vietnam. On 17 March 2022, aged 78, Gardiner died at his home in Gisborne. At his request, a tangihanga was not held at his marae, as he was concerned about the risk of any gathering in spreading COVID-19 and causing pressure on the public health system.

== Legacy ==
Following Gardiner's death, many tributes were paid to Gardiner's impact on New Zealand society. Matthew Tukaki said that Gardiner was "more than a soldier or leader to him, he was an agent of change, a servant of the people and someone who made a real difference." David Parker described him as "A former military man, a leader within Māoridom, [who gave] huge service to the National Party itself but also to public service."

== Honours ==
In the 2008 Queen's Birthday Honours, Gardiner was appointed a Distinguished Companion of the New Zealand Order of Merit, for services to Māori. In 2009, following the restoration of titular honours by the New Zealand government, he accepted redesignation as a Knight Companion of the New Zealand Order of Merit.

== Publications ==
- Gardiner, W. (2019). Ake ake kia kaha e! = Forever brave!: B Company 28 (Māori ) Battalion 1939–1945. Auckland, N.Z.: David Bateman.
- Gardiner, W. (2014). Parekura Horomia: 'Kia ora, chief!'. Auckland, N.Z. Huia Publishers.
- Gardiner, W. (2010). Haka. Auckland, N.Z: Hodder Moa.
- Gardiner, W. (2005). Haka. A living tradition. Auckland: Hachette Livre NZ Ltd.
- Gardiner, W. (1996). Return to sender: What really happened at the fiscal envelope hui. Auckland, N.Z.: Reed.
- Gardiner, W. (1995). The story of the Māori Battalion: Te mura o te ahi. New Zealand: Reed.
