= New Economics Party =

2011 New Zealand political party

The New Economics Party was a political party in New Zealand. It stood for a single electorate in the 2011 general election.

== Creation and policies ==
According to the party's website, the New Economics Party was founded in September 2011 and was led by Deirdre Kent, Laurence Boomert, and Phil Stevens.

The party advocated for substantial economic reform, including a universal basic income, re-regulation of the banking system, monetary reform including a system of multiple currencies, and to "remove the imperative for growth". It also sought a system whereby the Treasury would issue tax vouchers and trade them to buy land, using revenue on that land to pay dividends to the public.

== Electoral record ==
The party ran a single candidate in the 2011 election: Laurence Boomert in Wellington Central. Boomert had previously stood for the Progressive Greens in 1996 and for the Greens in 1999. Boomert received 44 votes (0.11%), coming 11th of 12 candidates.

It did not stand any candidates at the 2014 election, with Boomert standing instead for the Money Free Party in the West Coast-Tasman electorate.
