= Helen Kedgley =

New Zealand weaver, multimedia installation artist and academic

- Born: 1948 (age 77–78); Wellington, New Zealand
- Education: Victoria University of Wellington, École du Louvre, Beaux-Arts de Paris
- Known for: Arts

Helen Joan Kedgley (born in 1948 in Wellington) is a retired New Zealand art curator and gallery director, who remains active in arts governance. She is the twin sister of New Zealand politician Sue Kedgley and wife of retired diplomat and broadcaster Chris Laidlaw.

Along with her sister Sue, Kedgley grew up in Wellington and attended Samuel Marsden Collegiate School and Victoria University of Wellington where she earned a Bachelor of Arts majoring in politics.

After a year studying at the Elam School of Fine Arts at the University of Auckland Kedgley moved to Paris with her husband, diplomat Chris Laidlaw, and studied fine art and art history, graduated from the École du Louvre with a diploma in art history and from the École nationale supérieure des Beaux-Arts with an advanced diploma in fine arts.

Kedgley and Laidlaw travelled extensively for his diplomatic career for two decades, with Kedgley taking several arts-related roles as they moved about, including as a designer at the Science Museum in Oxford and at the African National Gallery in Zimbabwe.

On her return to Wellington, Kedgley became involved in Page 90 Artspace Gallery, a women's art initiative in Porirua. When Page 90 was absorbed into Pataka Art + Museum on its opening in 1998, Kedgley became a curator at the new gallery, and took over as director when founding director Darcy Nicholas stepped down in 2012.

Kedgley curated more than 50 exhibitions at Pātaka, including The Eternal Thread – The Changing Art of Maori Weaving, a partnership with Toi Māori Aotearoa and Tourism New Zealand, which was launched in San Francisco and toured the west coast of America and the 2008 exhibition Samoa Contemporary, the first large-scale exhibition of contemporary Samoan art.

Kedgley has also exhibited her own abstract paintings in New Zealand, the United Kingdom, Zimbabwe and India but focused on her career as a curator.

Kedgley retired from Pataka in 2015. She remains active in a range of governance roles, including:

- Trustee, New Zealand Portrait Gallery
- Trustee, Blumhardt Foundation
- Trustee, Pātaka Foundation
- Trustee, Wellington Sculpture Trust
