= Sharon Crosbie =

New Zealand broadcaster and broadcasting executive

Sharon Crosbie CNZM OBE
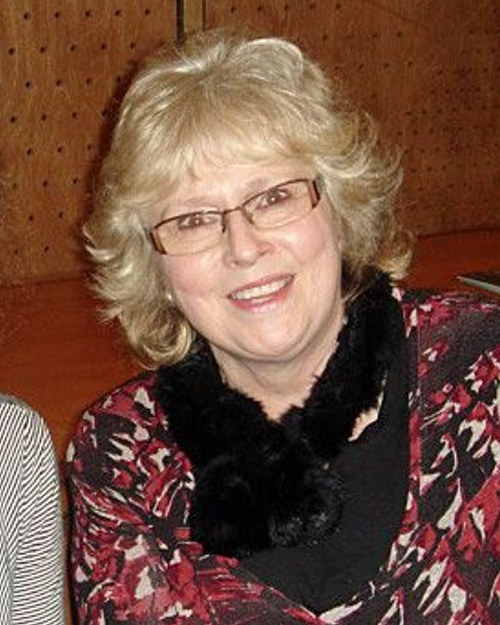
- Born: Sharon Margaret Crosbie; 1945 (age 79–80); Rangiora, New Zealand
- Occupation: Broadcaster

Sharon Margaret Crosbie CNZM OBE (born 1945) is a former broadcaster and broadcasting executive from New Zealand. She served as the chief executive of Radio New Zealand from 1995 to 2004.

== Life ==
Born in Rangiora in 1945, Crosbie studied at Victoria University of Wellington. She joined the New Zealand Broadcasting Corporation in 1969 and worked in a variety of roles in television and radio, including as host of the morning segment on the National Programme between 1978 and 1984. Crosbie was appointed chief executive of Radio New Zealand in 1995, and remained in that position until 2004.

In 1984, Crosbie was awarded a Harkness Fellowship and a Neiman Fellowship in journalism at Harvard University. She has been chairperson of the New Zealand Drama School, a 1990 Commissioner, a member of the New Zealand–Japan Foundation, a member of the Women’s Refuge Foundation Trust Board and was chairperson of the Ministerial Advisory Committee on Core Health Services. She is chair of the Electra Trust, an electricity distribution trust based in Levin.

Ahead of the 1989 local-body elections there was speculation she would seek the Citizens' Association nomination for Mayor of Wellington. She laughed at the suggestion and though it was "extraordinary" that there was speculation she would be a candidate. In 1992 she was again speculated as a candidate for mayor (this time for the Labour Party) at that year's local-body election. Later on she was approached to stand for Labour at the 1992 Wellington Central by-election, but declined to do so.

== Honours and awards ==
In the 1989 New Year Honours, Crosbie was appointed an Officer of the Order of the British Empire, for services to broadcasting. The following year, she was awarded the New Zealand 1990 Commemoration Medal. In the 2004 Queen's Birthday Honours, she was made a Companion of the New Zealand Order of Merit, for services to broadcasting and the community.
