= 1992 Wellington Central by-election =

New Zealand by-election

- 12 December 1992
- Turnout: 15,644 (63.30%)
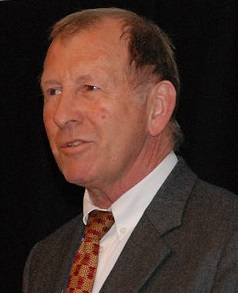

Candidate	Chris Laidlaw	Pauline Gardiner	Denis Welch
Party	Labour	National	Alliance
Popular vote	6,075	5,220	3,407
Percentage	38.83	33.37	21.78
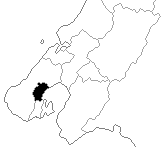
- Wellington Central electorate boundaries used for the by-election
Member before election
Fran Wilde
Labour
Elected Member
Chris Laidlaw
Labour

The 1992 Wellington Central by-election was a by-election held in the Wellington Central electorate during the 43rd New Zealand Parliament, on 12 December 1992. It was caused by the resignation of incumbent MP Fran Wilde after her election as mayor of Wellington and was won by Chris Laidlaw with a majority of 855.

== Background and candidates ==
Alliance

The Green Party candidate from the previous election, Stephen Rainbow said he would not contest the seat again as he was opposed to the Green Party's decision to join the Alliance. As the Green Party vote was significantly higher than both NewLabour and the Democrat parties combined, a Green candidate was viewed as the Alliance's best route to gaining the seat. There were rumours that Rainbow would instead be approached by Labour (which he was formerly a member of) to stand for them. A Labour official downplayed the rumour but did not rule out the possibility. Rainbow himself said he had no official approach from Labour and stated in any event he wished to concentrate on his role as a Wellington City Councillor.

Green Party city councillor Sue Kedgley was approached to stand, but she declined. Karen Roper, a policy manager at the Public Service Association was also contacted for nomination. She had previously contested the Wellington Central seat in the 1978 general election for the Values Party. Another former Values Party candidate, New Zealand Listener writer Denis Welch, was ultimately chosen as the Alliance candidate over Roper. Welch contested Miramar, also in the 1978 general election.

Labour

Although Labour were gaining ground in opinion polls, the party was cautious on the heels of the recent Tamaki by-election where their candidate finished a distant third. Leader Mike Moore said that the quality of the candidates would be "absolutely crucial" to deciding the outcome. Labour's candidate in the Tamaki by-election, Verna Smith, was "interested" in standing though decided to put her efforts into winning the candidacy for Titirangi in the lead up to the 1993 general election. Past President of the Public Service Association, Sue Piper contemplated standing. Former All Black Chris Laidlaw expressed his interest in standing for the seat immediately. He then held the position of New Zealand's Race Relations Conciliator. Frances Denz, a business skills adviser who unsuccessfully sought nomination in Dunedin North in 1990 put herself forward for the nomination. Two radio journalists, Sharon Crosbie and Barry Soper, were approached by Labour to stand in the seat with Soper rebuffing the offer and Crosbie not responding. Neil Gray, an operations manager at the Housing New Zealand Corporation, then declared his intentions to stand in the seat. Laidlaw ultimately won the selection over Denz and Gray.

National

National's candidate from the 1990 general election Pauline Gardiner (who lost by only 246 votes) announced she intended to stand again for the seat. The other nomination for the National candidacy was British-born Barbara Stones, a nursing lecturer at Wellington Polytechnic Another ex-All Black, David Kirk, was approached by National to stand for the seat, though he declined nomination. Wellington City Councillor Rex Nicholls, who regained a seat on the council in 1992 after failing to win the Mayoralty in 1989, also considered standing. His main concern was whether he could do two jobs at once as he did not want to force a council by-election should he win the seat. Another city councillor, Kerry Prendergast, ruled out seeking the nomination but stated national politics were a future possibility. Nicholls did not stand and former Wellington Regional Councillor Mike Gibson (alongside Gardiner and Stones) were the three candidates for the nomination with Gardiner gaining selection.

Others

Lawyer David Stevenson announced his candidature as an independent and would campaign against the extravagant superannuation payments for MPs. Stevenson had previously been a National member but resigned in 1990 after an expose by the programme Frontline which showed large business donations being behind the party. Prior, while still a member, he had sought National's nomination in Wellington Central, but lost to Gardiner.

The McGillicuddy Serious Party initially announced they would contest the by-election. They selected Tony Greer, a poet, as their candidate. Greer had made news in 1991 when he stole a delphinium plant from the home of social welfare minister Jenny Shipley's home as an act of protest against benefit cuts for which he was fined $286. Greer had just recently stood at the Christchurch mayoral election.

== Polling ==
The first poll conducted was before candidate selections were officially announced.

Poll	Date (Note: These are the survey dates of the poll, or if the survey dates are not stated, the date the poll was released.)	Pauline Gardiner	Chris Laidlaw	Denis Welch
ONE News-Heylen	17 October 1992	32	38	30
NBR-Insight Review	14 November 1992	13	37	17
ONE News-Heylen	18 November 1992	28	38	28
ONE News-Heylen	6 December 1992	28	38	28
Radio NZ/Dominion-MRL	7 December 1992	23	31	24

== Previous election ==
1990 general election: Wellington Central
Party	Candidate	Votes	%	±%
Labour	Fran Wilde	9,069	41.39	−13.15
National	Pauline Gardiner	8,823	40.26	
Green	Stephen Rainbow	3,164	14.45	
NewLabour	Jeff Montgomery	604	2.76	
McGillicuddy Serious	P P Clarke	175	0.80	
Democrats	R Henderson	49	0.22	
Communist League	Janet Roth	29	0.13	
Majority		246	1.12	−20.55
Turnout		21,913	88.67	−1.43
Registered electors		24,714		

== Results ==
The following table gives the election results:

1992 Wellington Central by-election
Party	Candidate	Votes	%	±%
Labour	Chris Laidlaw	6,075	38.83	−2.55
National	Pauline Gardiner	5,220	33.37	−6.90
Alliance	Denis Welch	3,407	21.78	+4.36^{1}
Independent	David Stevenson	389	2.49	
Natural Law	Ian Douglas	263	1.68	
Christian Heritage	Wayne Chapman	154	0.98	
Independent	Tim Shadbolt	64	0.41	
Wizard Party	Tony Catford	40	0.26	
Values	John Carter	17	0.11	
Communist League	Felicty Coggan	14	0.09	
Christ's Ambassadors Union	Victor Bryers	1	0.01	
Majority		855	5.47	+4.34
Turnout		15,644	63.30^{2}	−25.37^{2}
Labour hold		Swing		

^{1} Alliance vote change from 3,817 combined vote for Green Party, NewLabour and Democrats in 1990 election.

^{2} Based on 1990 election figures.

== See also ==
- 1992 Wellington City mayoral election
