= Ken Comber =

New Zealand politician

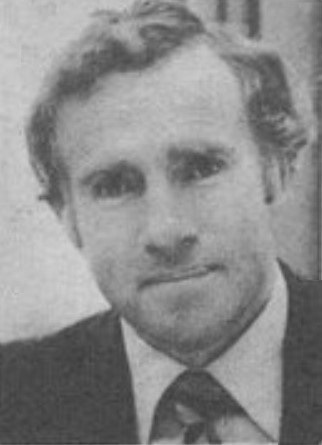
- Comber in 1978

Member of the New Zealand Parliament for Wellington Central
- In office 25 November 1972 – 28 November 1981
- Preceded by: Dan Riddiford
- Succeeded by: Fran Wilde

Personal details
- Born: 20 January 1939 New Plymouth, New Zealand
- Died: 6 December 1998 (aged 59) Wellington, New Zealand
- Party: National
- Spouse: Diane Holyoake (m. 1966)
- Children: 3
- Education: Victoria University College
- Profession: Accountant

Kenneth Mark Comber JP (20 January 1939 – 6 December 1998) was a New Zealand politician of the National Party, and an accountant.

== Biography ==
=== Early life and career ===
Comber was born in New Plymouth in 1939. He received his education at St Joseph's Convent, New Plymouth Boys' High School, and Victoria University College. He married Diane Holyoake, a daughter of Sir Keith Holyoake, in 1966, and they had three children together. He was a senior rugby player, representing North Island Universities as a student, and was later a member of the Wellington Rugby Football Union's management committee.

He trained as an accountant and was chief accountant for National Electric (1969–1972), and then general manager of John H. Walker and Co. Ltd (1972–1973).

=== Political career ===
New Zealand Parliament
| Years | Term | Electorate | Party |
|---|---|---|---|
| 1972–1975 | 37th | Wellington Central | National |
| 1975–1978 | 38th | Wellington Central | National |
| 1978–1981 | 39th | Wellington Central | National |

Comber joined the National Party in 1967 and was the secretary of the Wellington Branch (1970–1972). Holyoake "neither encouraged nor discouraged" Comber in his decision to seek the National nomination for Wellington Central when Dan Riddiford announced his retirement. Comber felt his father-in-law hadn't given him much chance of beating local lawyer Barry Brill for the candidacy, but he prevailed. After a closely fought campaign, he trailed Labour candidate David Shand on election night by 51 votes but 12 days later after special votes were counted Comber overturned Shand's majority by 27 votes giving him the ironical nickname 'Landslide' in Parliament. Despite the closeness of the result there was no hint of animosity between the two candidates and when he heard he had won Comber said he genuinely felt for his opponent.

He represented the Wellington Central electorate in Parliament from 1972 to 1981, when he was defeated by Labour's Fran Wilde. In the Muldoon cabinet, he was under-secretary for Internal Affairs, Local Government, Recreation and Sport, Civil Defence, and Arts. As an under-secretary he promoted physical fitness among MPs and encouraged flag-flying in workplaces to promote a sense of national pride.

A conservative on most issues, Comber staunchly defended Muldoon's refusal to intervene on the issue of sporting contacts with South Africa. As he represented a well educated urban electorate this put him out of step with his liberally minded constituents, and contributed to his loss at the 1981 election following the divisive Springbok tour earlier that year. Ahead of the 1987 election he unsuccessfully put himself forward for the National nomination in the Ohariu electorate which neighboured Wellington Central.

In 1977, Comber was awarded the Queen Elizabeth II Silver Jubilee Medal, and in 1990 he received the New Zealand 1990 Commemoration Medal.

He made two attempts to win the centre-right Citizens' Association nomination to run for Mayor of Wellington. In 1992 he was successful, beating, the Citizens' leader on the council Les Stephens, Eastern Ward councillor Ruth Gotlieb, former councillor Bryan Weyburne and former mayor Ian Lawrence. Comber's win was labelled a surprise by the media. The mayoralty race pitted him against Wilde in a "grudge match" repeat of 1981. Comber finished third with 15% of the vote to Wilde's 33%.

=== Later life and death ===
In 1991 he was appointed chairman of the New Zealand Fire Service, holding the position until 1996 when he became commissioner. In 1997 he was replaced by Roger Estall and Comber publicly opposed the appointment of Estall as his successor (which he first learned of over the radio news). He went as far as to resign from the National Party, to which he had belonged for 30 years, in protest calling the party "morally bankrupt" and glad that Holyoake was not alive to see the state of his old party. Comber said his disillusionment with National started in 1991, when it reneged on its pledge to scrap the superannuation surcharge, but was also disappointed by Prime Minister Jim Bolger's decision not to fully endorse Mark Thomas, National's Wellington Central candidate at the 1996 election.

Comber died of cancer in Wellington on 6 December 1998, at the age of 59. His wife, Diane Comber, died in 2026.

== Notes ==
New Zealand Parliament
| Preceded by Dan Riddiford | Member of Parliament for Wellington Central; 1972–1981 | Succeeded by Fran Wilde |
