= Ainsley Gardiner =

New Zealand film producer

Ainsley Gardiner MNZM
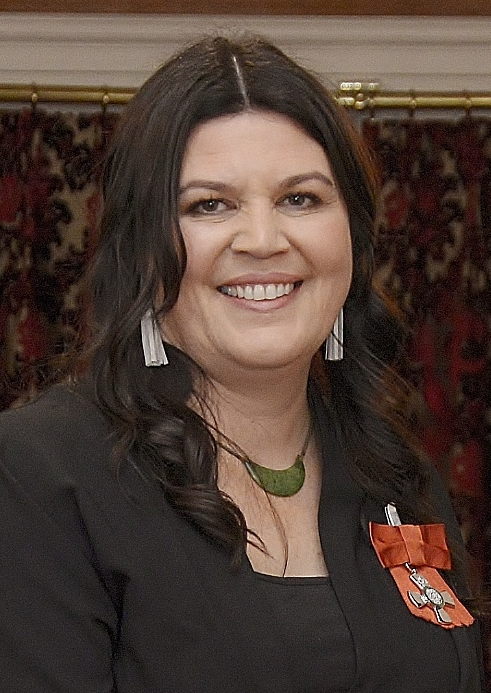
- Gardiner in 2018
- Born: Ainsley Amohaere Gardiner; Palmerston North, New Zealand
- Occupation: Film producer
- Relatives: Pauline Gardiner (mother); Wira Gardiner (father)

Ainsley Amohaere Gardiner MNZM is a film producer from New Zealand.

== Early life ==
Gardiner was born in Palmerston North and grew up in the Wellington suburb of Wadestown, attending Wadestown Primary School. Her mother is former MP Pauline Gardiner, and her father was a civil servant and politician, Wira Gardiner. When she was about 12 years old the family moved to Whakatāne. Gardiner is of Te Whānau-ā-Apanui, Ngāti Pikiao, Te Whakatōhea, Ngāti Awa and Tuwharetoa ki Kawerau descent.

== Career ==
In 1995, Gardiner completed the Avalon Film and TV production course, and went on to work with producer Larry Parr at Kahukura Productions. She began producing short films, and also co-produced a 26-part series Lovebites.

In 2003, she produced her first feature film, Kombi Nation, and co-produced Two Cars, One Night with Catherine Fitzgerald. The film, directed by Taika Waititi, became the first New Zealand short to be nominated for an Academy Award for Best Short Film.

In 2004, Gardiner and actor/producer Cliff Curtis formed a film production company focused on indigenous stories, called Whenua Films. The company received start-up funding from the New Zealand Film Commission. Gardiner worked with Curtis and Waititi to produce Tama Tū, Eagle vs Shark and the highly successful Boy, which set a new record for the highest grossing New Zealand film.

In 2007, Gardiner began co-presenting Iti Pounamu, a Māori Television series showcasing New Zealand short films. In 2009 Gardiner wrote and directed Mokopuna, a short film about a part-Māori girl who struggles to embrace her roots; the film won the best short film award at the Canadian indigenous film festival Dreamspeakers. Mokopuna was inspired by Gardiner's childhood as Māori girl living in Wadestown, Wellington, which had a very small Maori population.

In 2017, Gardiner joined a team of women directors and writers to create the feature film Waru, which focuses on child abuse in New Zealand. Gardiner wrote and directed the segment titled "Mihi," which focused on the life of a single mother struggling to make end's meet. More than 40 women had applied for the project in 2015, in which Gardiner was chosen to be among the final 9 women directors and writers to collaborate on the project.

In 2021, Gardiner and Briar Grace Smith co-developed and co-directed the feature film Cousins, an adaptation of the 1992 novel of the same name written by Patricia Grace. With its release, Gardiner and Grace Smith made history as the only Māori women to have directed a feature film since the release of Mauri by Merata Mita in 1988.

In 2023, Gardiner worked as an executive producer on the feature film Red, White & Brass, a Comedy Drama inspired by a true story of a Tongan super fan's attempt to get tickets to the Tonga vs. France Rugby World Cup.

== Honours and awards ==
In 2010, Gardiner and Curtis shared the SPADA New Zealand Screen Industry Awards title of Independent Producer of the Year.

In the 2018 Queen's Birthday Honours, Gardiner was appointed a Member of the New Zealand Order of Merit, for services to film and television.

In 2019, Gardiner and Briar Grace Smith were the recipients of the Sundance Institute Merata Mita Fellowship.

== Filmmaking ==
=== Method ===
Gardiner describes her approach to filmmaking as collaborative and intuitive, in which community is at the center of both the production and development process. In the making of Cousins, Briar Grace Smith states that she and Ainsley Gardiner worked best with a "flat hierarchy," in which neither filmmaker had more control or command than the other. In an interview with Sundance, Gardiner explains that her process of filmmaking has been shaped by her Māori identity in which there is a convergence of community and storytelling.

Gardiner's cinematic language also revolves around visual and thematic metaphors.

=== Influence ===
Gardiner has stated that Merata Meta has had a large influence on her life and career.

== Screenography ==
| Film | Year | Role | Notes |
|---|---|---|---|
| The Hole | 1998 | Producer | |
| Ouch | 1999 | Producer | |
| Kombi Nation | 2003 | Producer | Nominated for Best Film, 2003 New Zealand Film Awards |
| Ebony Society | 2003 | Co-producer (with Chelsea Winstanley) | Winner, Best Short Film, 2011 Aotearoa Film and Television Awards |
| Two Cars, One Night | 2004 | Co-producer (with Catherine Fitzgerald) | Nominated for an Academy Award for Best Live Action Short Film, 2005 Best Short Film – Panorama Section, 2004 Berlin Film Festival Winner, Best Drama, 2004 Aspen Film Festival Prize of the Cinema Jury, 2004 Oberhausen Film Festival Jury Prize, 2004 Newport Film Festival Best Short Film, 2004 Hamburg Short Film Festival Best Short Film, 2004 Seattle Film Festival Best Live Action Short Film, 2004 Melbourne International Film Festival Audience Award, 2004 National Geographic's All Roads Festival Grand Jury Prize for Best International Short Film, 2004 AFI Los Angeles Film Festival Nominated for Best Short Film, 2003 New Zealand Film Awards |
| Tama Tū | 2004 | Producer | Coopers Award for Best Film, 2006 Flickerfest (Australia) Special Jury Prize, Honourable Mention - Panorama Section, 2005 Berlin Film Festival (Germany) Honourable Mention in Short Film Making, 2005 Sundance Film Festival (United States) Best Fiction Short Film, 2005 Melbourne International Film Festival (Australia) First Prize - Short Film Competition, 2005 Stockholm International Film Festival (Sweden) Honourable Jury Mention, 2005 St Tropez Film Festival (France) Best Live Action Short, 2005 Palm Springs International Film Festival (United States) Linda Mabalot New Director's/New Visions Award, 2005 VC LA Asian Pacific Film Festival (United States) Special Jury Prize, 2005 Aspen Shortsfest (United States) Grand Jury Prize for Best Short, 2005 Indianapolis International Film Festival (United States) |
| Hawaikii | 2006 | Executive producer | |
| The Speaker | 2006 | Executive producer | |
| Eagle vs Shark | 2007 | Co-producer (with Cliff Curtis) | Nominated for Best Picture - Budget over $1 Million, 2008 Qantas Film and Television Awards |
| Taua - War Party | 2007 | Executive producer | |
| Shadow over the Sun | 2007 | Executive producer | |
| Mokopuna | 2008 | Writer, director and executive producer | Winner, Best Short Film, Dreamspeakers (Canada) |
| Boy | 2010 | Co-producer (with Emanuel Michael and Cliff Curtis) | Winner, Best Feature Film, 2010 Qantas Film and Television Awards Nominated for Best Children's Feature Film, 2010 Asia Pacific Screen Awards |
| The Pā Boys | 2014 | Producer | |
| Fantail | 2014 | Executive producer | |
| Waru | 2017 | Writer and director of a 10-minute segment (with 8 other directors contributing same) titled Mihi | Winner, Best Feature Film Script, New Zealand Writers Guild Awards (SWANZ) 2017; Winner, Mana Wairoa Festival Prize, Wairoa Maori Film Festival 2017; Winner, Grand Jury Award, Asia-Pacific Film Festival 2018; Winner, Best Film, Seattle International Film Festival 2018 |
| Cousins | 2021 | Co-director and Writer | Nominated for Best Film - Giffoni Film Festival 2021 Nominated for Best International Film - Golden Rooster Awards 2021 Nominated for Best Cinematography for a Motion Picture - Sichuan Film Festival 2023 |
| Night Raiders | 2021 | Producer | |
| Red, White & Brass | 2023 | Executive Producer | Nominated for Best Film - Golden Space Needle Award, Seattle International Film Festival 2024 |
