= Dan Riddiford =

New Zealand politician

The Honourable Dan Riddiford MC
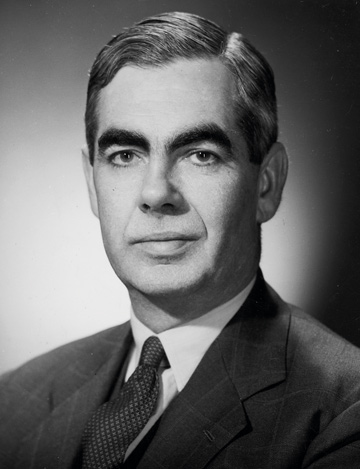

Member of the New Zealand Parliament for Wellington Central
- In office 26 November 1960 – 25 November 1972
- Preceded by: Frank Kitts
- Succeeded by: Ken Comber

21st Attorney-General of New Zealand
- In office 2 February 1971 – 9 February 1972
- Prime Minister: Keith Holyoake
- Preceded by: Jack Marshall
- Succeeded by: Roy Jack

34th Minister of Justice
- In office 22 December 1969 – 9 February 1972
- Prime Minister: Keith Holyoake
- Preceded by: Ralph Hanan
- Succeeded by: Roy Jack

Personal details
- Born: 11 March 1914 Featherston, New Zealand
- Died: 26 October 1974 (aged 60) Wellington, New Zealand
- Party: National
- Profession: Lawyer

Daniel Johnston Riddiford MC (11 March 1914 – 26 October 1974) was a New Zealand politician of the National Party.

== Biography ==
=== Early life ===
Riddiford was born in Featherston in 1914 a grandson of "King" Riddiford and Sydney Johnston of Oruawharo. He was educated in the UK at Downside School, Somerset, and New College, Oxford. He gained an MA in Modern Greats from Oxford, and also an LLB from the University of New Zealand. From 1932 to 1937, he farmed in the Wairarapa on family-owned land.

For a number of years Riddiford was also a director of The Dominion newspaper (now The Dominion Post).

=== Military service ===
He joined the New Zealand Expeditionary Force in 1939 and was an officer with the Royal Regiment of New Zealand Artillery. He was a prisoner of war in Italy from 1941 until his escape in 1943. He was awarded the MC in World War II. From 1946, he had a law practice in Wellington.

=== Political career ===
New Zealand Parliament
Years	Term	Electorate	Party
1960–1963	33rd	Wellington Central	National
1963–1966	34th	Wellington Central	National
1966–1969	35th	Wellington Central	National
1969–1972	36th	Wellington Central	National

Riddiford contested the Petone electorate in the 1957 election, but was beaten by the incumbent, Labour's Michael Moohan. In the 1960 election, he stood in the Wellington Central electorate and defeated the incumbent, Labour's Frank Kitts. Riddiford's win in Wellington Central was considered a surprise as the electorate had been held by Labour for the previous 42 years as well as Riddiford's rather aristocratic manner of campaigning which many thought unsuitable within an urban liberal electorate. In 1970 he suffered a heart attack. Riddiford would remain in Parliament until 1972, when he retired and succeeded by Ken Comber. Under Keith Holyoake, he was Minister of Justice (1969–1972) and Attorney-General (1971–1972).

== Family ==
He married his wife, Yvonne Ada Westmacott, in 1952. Earle Riddiford a notable New Zealand mountaineer and a lawyer was also a cousin.

== Notes ==
Political offices
Preceded by Ralph Hanan	Minister of Justice; 1969–1972	Succeeded by Roy Jack
Preceded by Jack Marshall	Attorney-General of New Zealand; 1971–1972	Succeeded by Roy Jack
New Zealand Parliament
Preceded by Frank Kitts	Member of Parliament for Wellington Central; 1960–1972	Succeeded by Ken Comber
