= Stephen Rainbow =

New Zealand politician

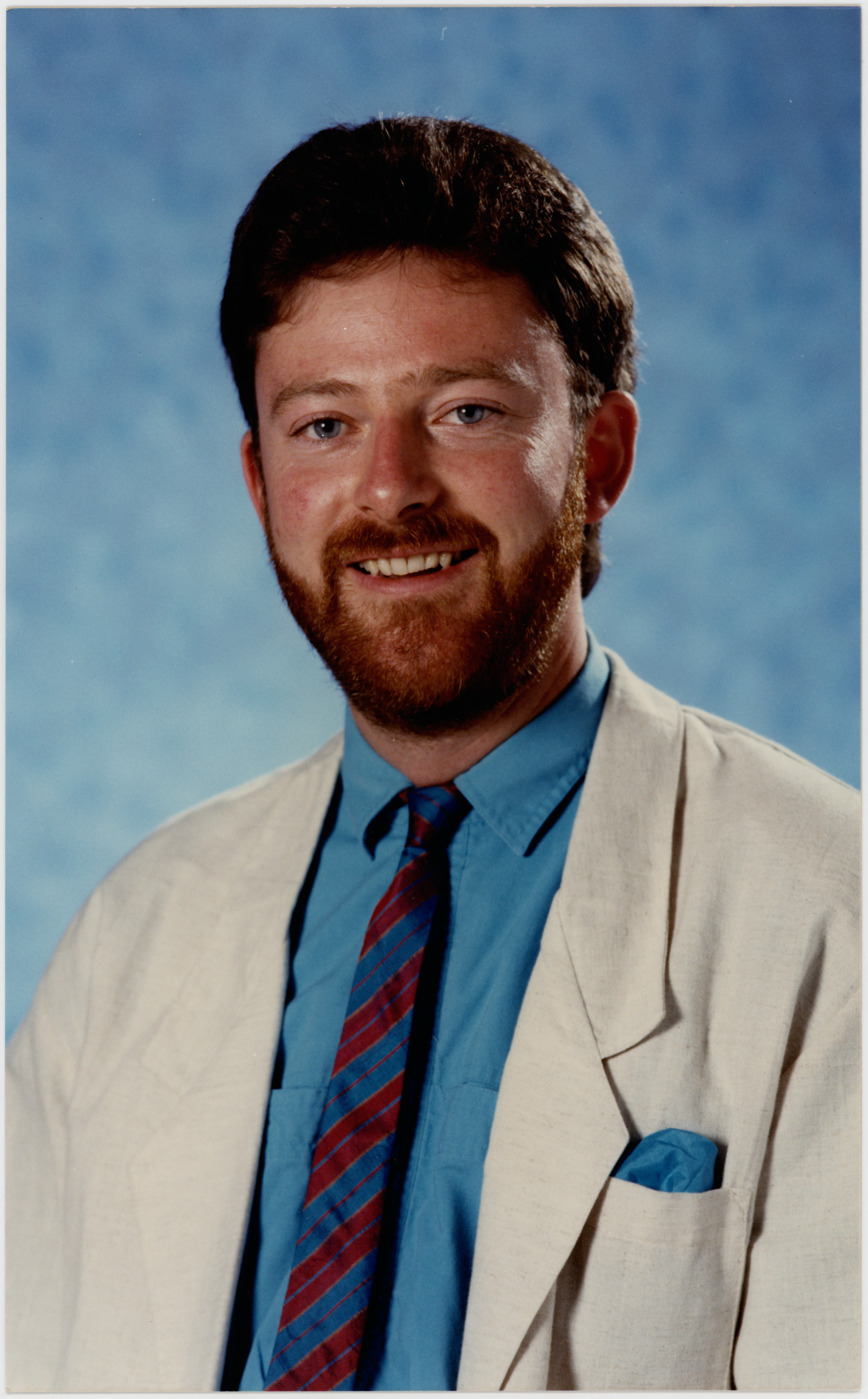
- Rainbow in 1990

Chief Human Rights Commissioner of New Zealand
- Incumbent
- Assumed office 11 November 2024
- Preceded by: Paul Hunt

Member of the Wellington City Council for Southern Ward
- In office 14 October 1995 – 10 October 1998 Serving with Celia Wade-Brown, Sue Piper, John Gilberthorpe
- Preceded by: Peter Parussini
- Succeeded by: Alick Shaw

Member of the Wellington City Council for Lambton Ward
- In office 14 October 1989 – 14 October 1995 Serving with Terry McDavitt, Russell Armitage, Rex Nicholls, Liz Thomas
- Preceded by: Margaret Bonner
- Succeeded by: Ward abolished

Personal details
- Born: 26 January 1961 (age 65) Christchurch, New Zealand
- Party: Labour Party (1977–84); Green Party (1989–95); Progressive Green (1995–99); National (1999)
- Education: Victoria University of Wellington

Stephen Laurence Rainbow (born 26 January 1961) is a New Zealand public servant and former local-body politician.

== Early life ==
Stephen Rainbow was born in Christchurch in 1961. He grew up on a tobacco farm south of Nelson and was educated in Richmond at Waimea College. Later he attended Victoria University of Wellington from 1982 and graduated in 1985 with a Bachelor of Arts, and in 1991 with a PhD in political science.

Rainbow and his partner Anna Frusin (who was born in the Soviet Union) had three children together; Alexandra, Larissa and Solomon.

== Political career ==
Rainbow became politically active in the 1970s joining the Labour Party and served on Labour's New Zealand Council. In 1983 he contested the Labour nomination to replace retiring party leader Bill Rowling in the Tasman seat, but lost to Ken Shirley. He did not renew his membership in 1984 and later joined the newly formed Green Party and stood for election in 1989 for the Wellington City Council on a Green ticket. He was successful and became the country's first Green councillor. The next year he contested the seat of Wellington Central for the Greens at the 1990 general election, finishing third out of seven candidates. Rainbow was opposed to the Green Party's decision to join the Alliance and declined to stand for them in the seat at the 1992 Wellington Central by-election. There were rumours that Rainbow would instead be approached by Labour (which he was formerly a member of) to stand for them. A Labour official downplayed the rumour but did not rule out the possibility. Rainbow himself said he had no official approach from Labour and stated in any event he wished to concentrate on his role as a Wellington City Councillor.

Rainbow was re-elected to the Wellington City Council in 1992 and 1995. On both occasions he also stood for Mayor without success, finishing fourth in 1992 and seventh in 1995.

By 1994 Rainbow was a leading voice of the opposition to the Green Party's membership of the Alliance, a broad left-wing coalition, thinking the Alliance's emphasis on social justice type issues detracted focus from environmental issues. In 1995 Rainbow co-founded the Progressive Green Party, a "Bluegreen" environmentalist party with a more right-wing emphasis.

In 1998 Rainbow decided not to seek re-election. By that time the Progressive Greens had disbanded and most members had joined the "Bluegreen" wing of the National Party, including Rainbow. At the 1999 general election, he stood as a list only candidate for National, ranked 51st. With a relatively low ranking he was not allocated a seat.

== Other activities ==
In the 2010s Rainbow was the manager of Auckland Transport's key relationships unit.

Rainbow is also a gay rights activist. He served as Chairman of Auckland-based phone support and LGBT advocacy service OUTLine and also a board member of the New Zealand AIDS Foundation. He campaigned for same sex marriage reform.

== Chief Human Rights Commissioner ==
=== Appointment ===
In August 2024, he was appointed to be New Zealand's Chief Human Rights Commissioner from November 2024 by Justice Minister Paul Goldsmith. Left-wing blogger Martyn Bradbury and The Spinoff editor Madeleine Chapman criticised Rainbow's appointment, citing his alleged transphobic and pro-Israel views. In mid-October 2024, Chapman reported that the independent panel set up to shortlist and interview candidates for the role did not recommend Rainbow. Goldsmith had pressed for Rainbow's appointment as Chief Human Rights Commissioner. In December 2025 the High Court found that the Minister's appointment of Rainbow was "unlawful" but did not overturn this appointment.

=== Genocide hotline ===
In late January 2025, Rainbow as Chief Human Rights Commissioner condemned a "genocide hotline" established by Palestine Solidarity Network Aotearoa national chairman John Minto, stating "the promotion may not be unlawful, however, the chief commissioner sees it as potentially harmful to Israeli and Jewish people in Aotearoa New Zealand." He called on the organisers to stop operating and promoting the hotline. According to Rainbow, the Human Rights Commission had received 90 complaints about the PSNA's "genocide hotline."

=== 2025 Islamophobia controversy ===
In early April 2025, Radio New Zealand and The Spinoff reported that Rainbow had claimed that a 2024 NZSIS threat assessment showed that Muslims posed a greater threat to the New Zealand Jewish community than White supremacists during a meeting with race relations commissioner Melissa Derby, two Human Rights Commission staff and Philippa Yasbek, the spokesperson for Alternative Jewish Voices and Dayenu: Jews Against Occupation on 24 February. Yasbek had met with the Human Rights Commission to discuss the Jewish community and race relations in New Zealand. Yasbek disagreed with Rainbow's remarks, contending that White supremacists posed a threat to both the Jewish and Muslim communities. She also argued that anti-Zionism should not be conflated with antisemitism, and argued that "racism is best fought by uniting with other groups experiencing racism, rather than arguing that Jews are exceptional in comparison to other ethnic or religious groups." Yasbek filed a complaint with Justice Minister Goldsmith, questioning Rainbow's suitability for the role of Chief Human Rights Commissioner and accusing him of Islamophobia.

The Federation of Islamic Associations of New Zealand (FIANZ) called Rainbow's comments "an alarming warning bell for human rights in this country." Following a meeting with FIANZ spokesperson Abdur Razzaq, Rainbow issued a personal apology. The NZSIS' director Andrew Hampton told The Spinoff that Rainbow had misrepresented the NZSIS' threat assessment and clarified that the report never stated that Muslims posed a greater threat to the Jewish community than White supremacists. In response to media coverage, Goldsmith confirmed that he would be meeting with Rainbow to advise him to "be more careful with his words." However, he refused to relieve Rainbow of his position and expressed confidence in his role as Chief Human Rights Commissioner.

== Views and positions ==
=== Alleged transphobia ===
In 2021 Rainbow was criticised for social media posts seen as transphobic. The comments were made regarding a petition to ban conversion therapy. Rainbow denied he was transphobic.

=== Antisemitism and the left ===
In January 2024, Rainbow penned a column on the website of the pro-Israel advocacy group "Israel Institute of New Zealand" (IINZ) about Israel–New Zealand relations. He suggested that the "keffiyeh-wearing antics" of some Labour and Green MPs showed that being "anti-Israel has become an integral part of the Leftist creed." Rainbow also wrote:

The Left has found a new underdog to replace the Jews -the Palestinians- in spite of the fact that the treatment of gay people, women, and political opponents wherever Palestinians have control is barbaric.

== Notes ==
Political offices
Preceded by Margaret Bonner	Wellington City Councillor for Lambton Ward; 1989–1995	Ward abolished
Preceded by Peter Parussini	Wellington City Councillor for Southern Ward; 1995–1998	Succeeded by Alick Shaw
Cultural offices
Preceded by Paul Hunt	Chief Human Rights Commissioner; 2024–present	Incumbent
