= David Shand (politician) =

New Zealand politician

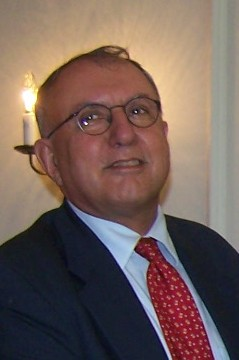
- Shand in 2009

Wellington City Councillor
- In office 9 October 1971 – 8 October 1977

Personal details
- Born: 1944 (age 81–82) Wellington, New Zealand
- Party: Labour
- Education: Victoria University of Wellington
- Profession: Academic

David Arthur Shand (born 1944) is a former New Zealand academic, and politician.

== Biography ==
=== Early career ===
Shand was born in Wellington and educated at Ohakune, Khandallah and Shannon Primary Schools and then at Horowhenuua College and Palmerston North Boys High School. He studied part-time for a B.Com. degree in accountancy at Victoria University starting in 1962 and completed his studies in 1966. He later completed an honours degree in economics. He was an active member of the Labour Party from the age of 18. He was active in student politics at Victoria University and in 1967 received a US State Department Far East Student Leader Grant.

In 1968 Shand was working as a senior investigating officer for the New Zealand Treasury. In 1968 he was seconded to Victoria University to become a lecturer in government finance. He was also a member of the University Council (1968–69) and chairman of the Wellington Government Accountants Society.

=== Political career ===
In 1971 Shand won a seat on the Wellington City Council on a Labour ticket which he was to hold until 1977. He was also a member of the Wellington Regional Planning Authority. Wellington Mayor Sir Michael Fowler later described Shand as an "extremely good" councillor.

Shand stood for election to the New Zealand House of Representatives for the Labour Party in two consecutive elections. He stood in Wellington Central in both 1972 and 1975. He came in second place on both occasions. Shand won the seat on election night in 1972 but ultimately lost by only 27 votes after special votes were counted. As a result of his provisional lead he attended the first Labour caucus after the 1972 election and was able to cast votes in the election of cabinet. He contested the Labour nomination for the Island Bay electorate in 1977 following the controversial de-selection of incumbent MP Gerald O'Brien. He later contemplated standing in the seat of Heretaunga in the 1981 general election.

=== Later activities ===
Shand left New Zealand in 1977 and moved to Australia where he taught at the Australian National University. He left academia in 1981 and took up senior positions in the Australian Department of Finance, the Queensland Public Sector Management Commission and the Victorian Treasury. In 1986 he was appointed as the head of New Zealand's Government Financial Support Service. He subsequently worked on public financial management in three international organisations – OECD (Paris), IMF and World Bank (Washington DC) before retiring to New Zealand in 2006. Shand later became a member of the Royal Commission on Auckland Governance, having previously served as chair of the Local Government Rates Inquiry and also as chair of the Tertiary Education Commission. In 2006 he was appointed by the government to the board of Meridian Energy, remaining there until 2009.

Shand's community activities have included Trustee of the NZ Portrait gallery and board member of the Auckland City Mission. Shand is of Maori descent through Rakiura (Stewart Island) Maori – Ngai Tahu and Ngati Mamoe and has undertaken financial advisory work for Ngai Tahu.

Shand intended a return to politics and stood as an independent candidate for the Capital and Coast District Health Board in the 2019 local elections but he was unsuccessful.
