= Wellington Central (electorate) =

- Single-member constituency for the New Zealand House of Representatives
- Location of Wellington Central within Wellington
- Region: Wellington

Current constituency
- Created: 1996 (current form); 1905 (original)
- Last MP: Tamatha Paul
- Party: Green

Wellington Central was a New Zealand electorate, returning a single member to the New Zealand House of Representatives. The current MP for Wellington Central is Tamatha Paul of the Green Party. She has held this position since the 2023 general election. The electorate was abolished ahead of the 2026 general election.

== Population centres ==
From 1890 until 1905, the four main centres of New Zealand (Auckland, Wellington, Christchurch and Dunedin) were represented by three-member electorates. The City Single Electorates Act 1903 divided those electorates, effective from the end of the 15th Parliament. The City of Wellington electorate was split into the Wellington East, Wellington Central, and Wellington North electorates. Wellington Central was focused on the city's central business district and surrounding suburbs.

As of 2020, Wellington Central covered the central city and its immediate suburban periphery from Karori in the west to the summit of Mount Victoria in the east, and southwards to a boundary with the Rongotai electorate near Wellington Hospital. The northern boundary with Ōhāriu ran through Wilton and between Thorndon and Wadestown (which was in Wellington Central until 2014). From 1996 until 1999, its boundaries extended further north to include the suburbs of Ngaio and Khandallah.

Wellington Central has one of the most affluent and well-educated constituencies in New Zealand. It is home to many government agencies, as well as to the New Zealand Parliament Buildings and to two universities.

== History ==
Wellington Central was established in 1905 when the multi-member urban electorate City of Wellington was replaced by three new seats: Wellington East, Wellington North and Wellington Central. A prominent holder of the seat was Labour Party leader Peter Fraser, who was Prime Minister from 1940 to 1949.

The electorate was abolished in 1993, when a redistribution moved its boundary west, replaced by Wellington-Karori. Three years later, Wellington Central was recreated with a larger catchment as one of the 65 electorates used in the 1996 election. ACT New Zealand leader Richard Prebble won the electorate following National Party leader Jim Bolger's endorsement of Prebble over National candidate Mark Thomas, in order for the new ACT party to get into parliament. This election was featured in the documentary film Campaign directed by Tony Sutorius.

Labour candidates Marian Hobbs and Grant Robertson held the seat from 1999 until 2023, when it was won by Green Party candidate Tamatha Paul.

The 2025 boundary review required a reduction in North Island electorates by one to reflect nationwide population shifts. The three Wellington City electorates (Rongotai, Wellington Central and Ōhāriu) were all underpopulated. All were abolished. The population of Wellington Central was redistributed to Wellington North and Wellington Bays.

=== Members of Parliament ===
Key

| New Liberal | Independent | Reform | Liberal |
| Labour | National | ACT | Green |

| Election | Winner |
|---|---|
| 1905 election | Francis Fisher |
| 1908 election | Francis Fisher |
| 1911 election | Francis Fisher |
| 1914 election | Robert Fletcher |
| 1918 by-election | Peter Fraser |
| 1919 election | Peter Fraser |
| 1922 election | Peter Fraser |
| 1925 election | Peter Fraser |
| 1928 election | Peter Fraser |
| 1931 election | Peter Fraser |
| 1935 election | Peter Fraser |
| 1938 election | Peter Fraser |
| 1943 election | Peter Fraser |
| 1946 election | Charles Chapman |
| 1949 election | Charles Chapman |
| 1951 election | Charles Chapman |
| 1954 election | Frank Kitts |
| 1957 election | Frank Kitts |
| 1960 election | Dan Riddiford |
| 1963 election | Dan Riddiford |
| 1966 election | Dan Riddiford |
| 1969 election | Dan Riddiford |
| 1972 election | Ken Comber |
| 1975 election | Ken Comber |
| 1978 election | Ken Comber |
| 1981 election | Fran Wilde |
| 1984 election | Fran Wilde |
| 1987 election | Fran Wilde |
| 1990 election | Fran Wilde |
| 1992 by-election | Chris Laidlaw |
(electorate abolished 1993–1996; see Wellington-Karori)
| 1996 election | Richard Prebble |
| 1999 election | Marian Hobbs |
| 2002 election | Marian Hobbs |
| 2005 election | Marian Hobbs |
| 2008 election | Grant Robertson |
| 2011 election | Grant Robertson |
| 2014 election | Grant Robertson |
| 2017 election | Grant Robertson |
| 2020 election | Grant Robertson |
| 2023 election | Tamatha Paul |
(Electorate abolished in 2026; see Wellington North)

=== List MPs ===
Members of Parliament elected from party lists in elections where that person also unsuccessfully contested the Wellington Central electorate. Unless otherwise stated, all MPs terms began and ended at general elections.

| Election | Winner |
|---|---|
| 1999 election | Richard Prebble |
| 2002 election | Stephen Franks |
| 2002 election | Sue Kedgley |
| 2005 election | Mark Blumsky |
| 2005 election | Sue Kedgley |
| 2008 election | Sue Kedgley |
| 2008 election | Heather Roy |
| 2013 | Paul Foster-Bell^{1} |
| 2014 election | James Shaw |
| 2014 election | Paul Foster-Bell |
| 2017 election | James Shaw |
| 2018 | Nicola Willis^{2} |
| 2020 election | James Shaw |
| 2020 election | Nicola Willis |
| 2020 election | Brooke van Velden |

^{1}Foster-Bell was elected from the party list in May 2013 following the resignation of Jackie Blue.
^{2}Willis was elected from the party list in April 2018 following the resignation of Steven Joyce.

== Election results ==
=== 2023 election ===
2023 general election: Wellington Central
| Notes: | Blue background denotes the winner of the electorate vote. Pink background denotes a candidate elected from their party list. Yellow background denotes an electorate win by a list member, or other incumbent. A ✓ or ✗ denotes status of any incumbent, win or lose respectively. | | | | | | |
| Party | Candidate | Votes | % | ±% | Party votes | % | ±% |
|---|---|---|---|---|---|---|---|
| Green | Tamatha Paul | 18,439 | 40.56 | +23.02 | 17,332 | 37.69 | +7.36 |
| Labour | Ibrahim Omer | 12,373 | 27.22 | −32.39 | 11,436 | 24.87 | −18.53 |
| National | Scott Sheeran | 11,555 | 25.42 | +7.66 | 9,855 | 21.43 | +7.00 |
| Opportunities | Natalia Albert | 1,554 | 3.42 | +1.26 | 2,536 | 5.51 | +1.79 |
| NZ First | Taylor Arneil | 493 | 1.08 | +1.08 | 1,029 | 2.24 | +1.13 |
| Legalise Cannabis | Michael Appleby | 418 | 0.92 | +0.08 | 136 | 0.30 | +0.03 |
| Animal Justice | Christopher Gordon | 111 | 0.24 | +0.24 | 61 | 0.14 | +0.14 |
| Vision New Zealand | Meg Lim | 80 | 0.18 | +0.18 | | | |
| Workers Now | Don Franks | 67 | 0.15 | +0.15 | | | |
| Independent | Karl Thomas Geiringer | 43 | 0.09 | +0.09 | | | |
| Independent | Pete Bains | 36 | 0.08 | +0.08 | | | |
| ACT | | | | | 2,075 | 4.51 | −0.35 |
| Te Pāti Māori | | | | | 1,106 | 2.40 | +1.87 |
| NZ Loyal | | | | | 80 | 0.17 | +0.17 |
| NewZeal | | | | | 57 | 0.12 | ±0.00 |
| Women's Rights | | | | | 54 | 0.12 | +0.12 |
| Freedoms NZ | | | | | 32 | 0.07 | +0.07 |
| New Conservative | | | | | 31 | 0.07 | −0.33 |
| DemocracyNZ | | | | | 18 | 0.04 | +0.04 |
| New Nation | | | | | 14 | 0.03 | +0.03 |
| Leighton Baker Party | | | | | 11 | 0.02 | +0.02 |
| Informal votes | | 287 | | | 126 | | |
| Total valid votes | | 45,456 | | | 45,989 | | |
| Turnout | | 46,252 | 84.48 | −4.49 | | | |
| Green gain from Labour | Majority | 6,066 | 13.34 | +23.02 | | | |

=== 2020 election ===
2020 general election: Wellington Central
| Notes: | Blue background denotes the winner of the electorate vote. Pink background denotes a candidate elected from their party list. Yellow background denotes an electorate win by a list member, or other incumbent. A ✓ or ✗ denotes status of any incumbent, win or lose respectively. | | | | | | |
| Party | Candidate | Votes | % | ±% | Party votes | % | ±% |
|---|---|---|---|---|---|---|---|
| Labour | ✓ Grant Robertson | 27,366 | 57.26 | +8 | 20,876 | 43.40 | +5.11 |
| National | Nicola Willis | 8,488 | 17.76 | −7.99 | 6,937 | 14.43 | −16.1 |
| Green | James Shaw | 8,381 | 17.54 | +2.15 | 14,587 | 30.33 | +8.99 |
| Opportunities | Abe Gray | 1,031 | 2.16 | −4.66 | 1,790 | 3.72 | −2.17 |
| ACT | Brooke van Velden | 865 | 1.81 | +1.5 | 2,339 | 4.86 | +4.09 |
| Legalise Cannabis | Michael Appleby | 401 | 0.84 | — | 132 | 0.27 | +0.7 |
| Independent | Jesse Richardson | 385 | 0.81 | | | | |
| New Conservative | Liam Richfield | 401 | 0.45 | | 204 | 0.42 | +0.35 |
| Advance NZ | Rose Greally | 108 | 0.23 | | 103 | 0.21 | |
| ONE | Gina Sunderland | 84 | 0.18 | | 56 | 0.12 | |
| Outdoors | Bruce Robert | 76 | 0.16 | | 27 | 0.06 | +0.03 |
| NZ First | | | | | 537 | 1.11 | −1.15 |
| Māori Party | | | | | 255 | 0.53 | −0.01 |
| Sustainable NZ | | | | | 32 | 0.07 | |
| Social Credit | | | | | 18 | 0.04 | |
| TEA | | | | | 12 | 0.02 | |
| Vision NZ | | | | | 8 | 0.01 | |
| Heartland | | | | | 1 | 0.00 | |
| Informal votes | | 386 | | | 176 | | |
| Total valid votes | | 47,787 | | | 48,090 | | |
| Turnout | | 48,090 | 88.97 | +2.41 | | | |
| Labour hold | Majority | 18,878 | 39.5 | +15.99 | | | |

=== 2017 election ===
2017 general election: Wellington Central
| Notes: | Blue background denotes the winner of the electorate vote. Pink background denotes a candidate elected from their party list. Yellow background denotes an electorate win by a list member, or other incumbent. A ✓ or ✗ denotes status of any incumbent, win or lose respectively. | | | | | | |
| Party | Candidate | Votes | % | ±% | Party votes | % | ±% |
|---|---|---|---|---|---|---|---|
| Labour | ✓ Grant Robertson | 20,873 | 49.26 | −2.38 | 16,500 | 38.29 | +14.51 |
| National | Nicola Willis | 10,910 | 25.75 | −4.34 | 13,156 | 30.53 | −7.01 |
| Green | James Shaw | 6,520 | 15.39 | +2.15 | 9,198 | 21.34 | −8.16 |
| Opportunities | Geoff Simmons | 2,892 | 6.82 | — | 2,538 | 5.89 | — |
| NZ First | Andy Foster | 797 | 1.88 | +0.37 | 972 | 2.26 | −1.32 |
| Independent | Gayaal Iddamalgoda | 161 | 0.38 | — | | | |
| ACT | Michael Warren | 131 | 0.31 | — | 330 | 0.77 | +0.07 |
| Independent | Peter Robinson | 71 | 0.17 | −0.11 | | | |
| Not A Party | Bob Wessex | 19 | 0.04 | — | | | |
| Māori Party | | | | | 225 | 0.52 | −0.25 |
| Legalise Cannabis | | | | | 55 | 0.13 | −0.19 |
| Conservative | | | | | 29 | 0.07 | −1.44 |
| United Future | | | | | 28 | 0.06 | −0.24 |
| Mana | | | | | 14 | 0.03 | −1.45 (Note: 2017 Mana Party swing is relative to the votes for Internet-Mana in 2014; it shared a party list with the Internet Party in the 2014 election) |
| Ban 1080 | | | | | 13 | 0.03 | −0.02 |
| Outdoors | | | | | 11 | 0.03 | — |
| People's Party | | | | | 10 | 0.03 | — |
| Internet | | | | | 9 | 0.02 | −1.46 (Note: 2017 Internet Party swing is relative to the votes for Internet-Mana in 2014; it shared a party list with Mana Party in the 2014 election) |
| Democrats | | | | | 6 | 0.01 | −0.06 |
| Informal votes | | 194 | | | 72 | | |
| Total valid votes | | 42,374 | | | 43,094 | | |
| Turnout | | 43,166 | 86.56 | +2.42 | | | |
| Labour hold | Majority | 9,963 | 23.51 | +1.95 | | | |

=== 2014 election ===
2014 general election: Wellington Central
| Notes: | Blue background denotes the winner of the electorate vote. Pink background denotes a candidate elected from their party list. Yellow background denotes an electorate win by a list member, or other incumbent. A ✓ or ✗ denotes status of any incumbent, win or lose respectively. | | | | | | |
| Party | Candidate | Votes | % | ±% | Party votes | % | ±% |
|---|---|---|---|---|---|---|---|
| Labour | ✓ Grant Robertson | 19,807 | 51.64 | +2.49 | 9,306 | 23.78 | −2.78 |
| National | Paul Foster-Bell | 11,540 | 30.09 | −2.42 | 14,689 | 37.54 | −0.88 |
| Green | James Shaw | 5,077 | 13.24 | −0.39 | 11,545 | 29.50 | +1.81 |
| NZ First | Hugh Barr | 580 | 1.51 | +0.78 | 1,399 | 3.58 | +0.70 |
| Legalise Cannabis | Alistair Gregory | 353 | 0.92 | −0.13 | 127 | 0.32 | −0.09 |
| Conservative | Brian Hooper | 307 | 0.80 | +0.18 | 590 | 1.51 | +0.82 |
| Internet | Callum Valentine | 217 | 0.57 | +0.57 | | | |
| Independent | Peter Robinson | 90 | 0.23 | +0.23 | | | |
| Democrats | James Knuckey | 57 | 0.15 | +0.15 | 26 | 0.07 | +0.03 |
| Independent | Puhi Karena | 52 | 0.14 | +0.06 | | | |
| Internet Mana | | | | | 578 | 1.48 | +0.85 (Note: 2014 Internet Mana swing is relative to the votes for Mana in 2011; it shared a party list with Internet in the 2014 election.) |
| Maori Party | | | | | 300 | 0.77 | +0.06 |
| ACT | | | | | 274 | 0.70 | −0.47 |
| United Future | | | | | 117 | 0.30 | −0.35 |
| Civilian | | | | | 49 | 0.13 | +0.13 |
| Ban 1080 | | | | | 20 | 0.05 | +0.05 |
| Focus | | | | | 5 | 0.01 | +0.01 |
| Independent Coalition | | | | | 5 | 0.01 | +0.01 |
| Informal votes | | 273 | | | 101 | | |
| Total valid votes | | 38,353 | | | 39,131 | | |
| Turnout | | 39,232 | 84.14 | +2.33 | | | |
| Labour hold | Majority | 8,267 | 21.56 | +4.92 | | | |

=== 2011 election ===
2011 general election: Wellington Central
| Notes: | Blue background denotes the winner of the electorate vote. Pink background denotes a candidate elected from their party list. Yellow background denotes an electorate win by a list member, or other incumbent. A ✓ or ✗ denotes status of any incumbent, win or lose respectively. | | | | | | |
| Party | Candidate | Votes | % | ±% | Party votes | % | ±% |
|---|---|---|---|---|---|---|---|
| Labour | ✓ Grant Robertson | 18,836 | 49.15 | +6.97 | 10,459 | 26.56 | −8.01 |
| National | Paul Foster-Bell | 12,460 | 32.51 | −4.96 | 15,128 | 38.42 | +3.01 |
| Green | James Shaw | 5,225 | 13.63 | −1.14 | 10,903 | 27.69 | +7.08 |
| ACT | Stephen Whittington | 412 | 1.07 | −1.21 | 462 | 1.17 | −2.78 |
| Legalise Cannabis | Michael Appleby | 404 | 1.05 | +0.05 | 161 | 0.41 | +0.15 |
| NZ First | Ben Craven | 279 | 0.73 | +0.73 | 1,132 | 2.88 | +1.35 |
| Pirate | Gynn Rickerby | 277 | 0.72 | +0.72 | | | |
| Conservative | Paul Stipkovits | 236 | 0.62 | +0.62 | 270 | 0.69 | +0.69 |
| Libertarianz | Reagan Cutting | 69 | 0.18 | −0.01 | 40 | 0.10 | −0.01 |
| Alliance | Kelly Buchanan | 52 | 0.14 | +0.14 | 18 | 0.05 | -0.003 |
| New Economics | Laurence Boomert | 44 | 0.11 | +0.11 | | | |
| Independent | Puhi Karena | 32 | 0.08 | +0.08 | | | |
| Maori Party | | | | | 278 | 0.71 | −0.15 |
| United Future | | | | | 256 | 0.65 | −0.35 |
| Mana | | | | | 250 | 0.63 | +0.63 |
| Democrats | | | | | 15 | 0.04 | +0.03 |
| Informal votes | | 411 | | | 153 | | |
| Total valid votes | | 38,326 | | | 39,372 | | |
| Labour hold | Majority | 6,376 | 16.64 | +11.92 | | | |

Electorate (as at 26 November 2011): 48,316

=== 2008 election ===
2008 general election: Wellington Central
| Notes: | Blue background denotes the winner of the electorate vote. Pink background denotes a candidate elected from their party list. Yellow background denotes an electorate win by a list member, or other incumbent. A ✓ or ✗ denotes status of any incumbent, win or lose respectively. | | | | | | |
| Party | Candidate | Votes | % | ±% | Party votes | % | ±% |
|---|---|---|---|---|---|---|---|
| Labour | Grant Robertson | 17,046 | 42.18 | | 14,244 | 34.57 | |
| National | Stephen Franks | 15,142 | 37.47 | | 14,589 | 35.41 | |
| Green | Sue Kedgley | 5,971 | 14.78 | | 8,494 | 20.62 | |
| ACT | Heather Roy | 922 | 2.28 | | 1,628 | 3.95 | |
| Legalise Cannabis | Michael Appleby | 407 | 1.01 | | 108 | 0.26 | |
| United Future | Vaughan Smith | 226 | 0.56 | | 412 | 1.00 | |
| Workers Party | Don Franks | 171 | 0.42 | | 38 | 0.09 | |
| Progressive | David Somerset | 141 | 0.35 | | 272 | 0.66 | |
| Kiwi | Rebekah Clement | 106 | 0.26 | | 84 | 0.20 | |
| Libertarianz | Bernard Darnton | 75 | 0.19 | | 48 | 0.12 | |
| RAM | Grant Brookes | 61 | 0.15 | | 13 | 0.03 | |
| Independent | Al Mansell | 58 | 0.14 | – | | | |
| RONZ | Justin Harnish | 46 | 0.11 | | 5 | 0.01 | |
| Alliance | Richard Wallis | 39 | 0.10 | | 20 | 0.05 | |
| NZ First | | | | | 629 | 1.53 | |
| Maori Party | | | | | 351 | 0.85 | |
| Bill and Ben | | | | | 215 | 0.52 | |
| Family Party | | | | | 38 | 0.09 | |
| Pacific | | | | | 8 | 0.02 | |
| Democrats | | | | | 4 | 0.01 | |
| Informal votes | | 229 | | | 86 | | |
| Total valid votes | | 40,411 | | | 41,200 | | |
| Labour hold | Majority | 1,904 | | | | | |

=== 2005 election ===
2005 general election: Wellington Central
| Notes: | Blue background denotes the winner of the electorate vote. Pink background denotes a candidate elected from their party list. Yellow background denotes an electorate win by a list member, or other incumbent. A ✓ or ✗ denotes status of any incumbent, win or lose respectively. | | | | | | |
| Party | Candidate | Votes | % | ±% | Party votes | % | ±% |
|---|---|---|---|---|---|---|---|
| Labour | ✓ Marian Hobbs | 20,199 | 49.32 | +8.26 | 17,936 | 43.26 | |
| National | Mark Blumsky | 14,019 | 34.23 | +4.69 | 13,513 | 32.59 | |
| Green | Sue Kedgley | 3,737 | 9.12 | −3.93 | 6,530 | 15.75 | |
| ACT | Stephen Franks | 1,254 | 3.06 | | 848 | 2.05 | |
| United Future | Fiona McKenzie | 593 | 1.45 | | 1,068 | 2.58 | |
| Legalise Cannabis | Michael Appleby | 426 | 1.04 | | 98 | 0.24 | |
| Progressive | David Somerset | 173 | 0.26 | | 309 | 0.75 | |
| Anti-Capitalist Alliance | Stephen Hay | 107 | 0.26 | | | | |
| Libertarianz | Bernard Darnton | 79 | 0.19 | | 42 | 0.10 | |
| Alliance | Kane O'Connell | 79 | 0.19 | | 35 | 0.08 | |
| NZ First | | | | | 707 | 1.71 | |
| Maori Party | | | | | 168 | 0.41 | |
| Destiny | | | | | 67 | 0.16 | |
| Christian Heritage | | | | | 24 | 0.06 | |
| Democrats | | | | | 10 | 0.02 | |
| 99 MP | | | | | 8 | 0.02 | |
| RONZ | | | | | 4 | 0.01 | |
| Family Rights | | | | | 3 | 0.01 | |
| Direct Democracy | | | | | 2 | 0.00 | |
| One NZ | | | | | 1 | 0.00 | |
| Informal votes | | 288 | | | 86 | | |
| Total valid votes | | 40,954 | | | 41,459 | | |
| Labour hold | Majority | 6,180 | 15.09 | +3.57 | | | |

=== 1999 election ===
The National party did not stand a candidate in this election because of the events of the 1996 Wellington Central election where then leader Prime Minister Jim Bolger withdrew support for National’s candidate Mark Thomas just before the election in preference for Act leader Richard Prebble.

The absence of a National candidate in this election did not help Richard Prebble and he lost the seat to new Labour candidate Marian Hobbs.

1999 general election: Wellington Central
| Notes: | Blue background denotes the winner of the electorate vote. Pink background denotes a candidate elected from their party list. Yellow background denotes an electorate win by a list member, or other incumbent. A ✓ or ✗ denotes status of any incumbent, win or lose respectively. | | | | | | |
| Party | Candidate | Votes | % | ±% | Party votes | % | ±% |
|---|---|---|---|---|---|---|---|
| Labour | Marian Hobbs | 17,470 | 48.37 | +18.12 | 11,960 | 32.71 | +6.41 |
| ACT | ✗ Richard Prebble | 15,988 | 44.27 | +9.49 | 2,807 | 7.68 | +1.07 |
| Legalise Cannabis | Michael Appleby | 787 | 2.18 | +0.93 | 582 | 1.59 | −0.63 |
| Christian Democrats | Anthony Walton | 394 | 1.09 | | 297 | 0.81 | |
| United NZ | Kent Clark | 324 | 0.90 | −4.64 | 394 | 1.08 | −1.72 |
| NZ First | Jonathan Mosen | 308 | 0.85 | +0.66 | 507 | 1.39 | −0.32 |
| Christian Heritage | Leona Emberson-Ready | 226 | 0.63 | −0.10 | 315 | 0.86 | −1.51 (Note: 1999 Christian Heritage swing is relative to the votes for Christian Coalition in 1996; the Christian Coalition split back into the Christian Heritage Party and Christian Democrats.) |
| McGillicuddy Serious | Amy Ross | 218 | 0.60 | +0.23 | 69 | 0.19 | −0.10 |
| Independent | Marion Smith | 218 | 0.60 | | | | |
| Independent | Lea Barker | 76 | 0.21 | | | | |
| Asia Pacific | Bihua Fu | 56 | 0.16 | +0.02 | 0 | 0.00 | −0.07 |
| Natural Law | Daniel Meares | 50 | 0.14 | +0.01 | 36 | 0.10 | −0.01 |
| National | | | | | 13,086 | 35.79 | −9.88 |
| Green | | | | | 3,543 | 9.69 | |
| Alliance | | | | | 2,787 | 7.62 | −1.54 |
| Libertarianz | | | | | 78 | 0.21 | +0.16 |
| Animals First | | | | | 43 | 0.12 | −0.05 |
| Mauri Pacific | | | | | 21 | 0.06 | |
| Mana Māori | | | | | 11 | 0.03 | −0.08 |
| NMP | | | | | 10 | 0.03 | |
| South Island | | | | | 8 | 0.02 | |
| Republican | | | | | 3 | 0.01 | |
| Freedom Movement | | | | | 2 | 0.01 | |
| The People's Choice | | | | | 2 | 0.01 | |
| One NZ | | | | | 1 | 0.00 | |
| Informal votes | | 631 | | | 184 | | |
| Total valid votes | | 36,115 | | | 36,562 | | |
| Labour gain from ACT | Majority | 1,482 | 4.10 | +13.81 | | | |

=== 1996 election ===
The 1996 election, the first under the new electoral system MMP, saw ACT candidate and former Labour Cabinet Minister Richard Prebble compete against former National Party Wellington-Karori MP Pauline Gardiner now standing for United New Zealand, the National party candidate Mark Thomas, Labour's Alick Shaw and Danna Glendining for the Alliance.

The election campaign saw Prime Minister Jim Bolger endorse Richard Prebble shortly before the election in preference to Thomas. The events were captured in the movie Campaign. The electorate was won by Richard Prebble.

1996 general election: Wellington Central
| Notes: | Blue background denotes the winner of the electorate vote. Pink background denotes a candidate elected from their party list. Yellow background denotes an electorate win by a list member, or other incumbent. A ✓ or ✗ denotes status of any incumbent, win or lose respectively. | | | | | | |
| Party | Candidate | Votes | % | ±% | Party votes | % | ±% |
|---|---|---|---|---|---|---|---|
| ACT | Richard Prebble | 14,269 | 34.78 | | 2,717 | 6.61 | |
| Labour | Alick Shaw | 12,409 | 30.25 | | 10,816 | 26.30 | |
| National | Mark Thomas | 8,794 | 21.44 | | 18,780 | 45.67 | |
| United NZ | ✗ Pauline Gardiner | 2,233 | 5.54 | | 1,151 | 2.80 | |
| Alliance | Danna Glendining | 1,356 | 3.31 | | 3,766 | 9.16 | |
| Legalise Cannabis | Michael Appleby | 513 | 1.25 | | 912 | 2.22 | |
| NZ First | Sarah Porter | 480 | 1.17 | | 707 | 1.71 | |
| Christian Coalition | Robin Corner | 300 | 0.73 | | 973 | 2.37 | |
| Independent | Andy Foster | 214 | 0.52 | | | | |
| McGillicuddy Serious | Ross Gardner | 151 | 0.37 | | 121 | 0.29 | |
| Progressive Green | Alison Davis | 137 | 0.33 | | 121 | 0.29 | |
| Asia Pacific | Rama Ramanathan | 59 | 0.14 | | 27 | 0.07 | |
| Natural Law | Daniel Meares | 54 | 0.13 | | 47 | 0.11 | |
| Mana Māori | Waiariki Grace | 27 | 0.13 | | 47 | 0.11 | |
| Libertarianz | Nikolas Haden | 19 | 0.05 | | 21 | 0.05 | |
| Independent | Peter Franklin Robinson | 11 | 0.03 | | | | |
| Animals First | | | | | 69 | 0.17 | |
| Ethnic Minority | | | | | 23 | 0.06 | |
| Superannuitants & Youth | | | | | 14 | 0.03 | |
| Green Society | | | | | 11 | 0.03 | |
| Advance NZ | | | | | 10 | 0.02 | |
| Conservatives | | | | | 6 | 0.01 | |
| Te Tawharau | | | | | 0 | 0.00 | |
| Informal votes | | 203 | | | 109 | | |
| Total valid votes | | 41,026 | | | 41,120 | | |
| ACT win new seat | Majority | 1,860 | 15.09 | | | | |

=== 1992 by-election ===
1992 Wellington Central by-election
| Party | Candidate | Votes | % | ±% |
|---|---|---|---|---|
| Labour | Chris Laidlaw | 6,075 | 38.83 | −2.55 |
| National | Pauline Gardiner | 5,220 | 33.37 | −6.90 |
| Alliance | Denis Welch | 3,407 | 21.78 | +4.36^{1} |
| Independent | David Stevenson | 389 | 2.49 | |
| Natural Law | Ian Douglas | 263 | 1.68 | |
| Christian Heritage | Wayne Chapman | 154 | 0.98 | |
| Independent | Tim Shadbolt | 64 | 0.41 | |
| Wizard Party | Tony Catford | 40 | 0.26 | |
| Values | John Carter | 17 | 0.11 | |
| Communist League | Felicty Coggan | 14 | 0.09 | |
| Christ's Ambassadors Union | Victor Bryers | 1 | 0.01 | |
| Majority | | 855 | 5.47 | +4.34 |
| Turnout | | 15,644 | 63.30^{2} | −25.37^{2} |
| Labour hold | | Swing | | |

=== 1990 election ===
1990 general election: Wellington Central
| Party | Candidate | Votes | % | ±% |
|---|---|---|---|---|
| Labour | Fran Wilde | 9,069 | 41.39 | −13.15 |
| National | Pauline Gardiner | 8,823 | 40.26 | |
| Green | Stephen Rainbow | 3,164 | 14.45 | |
| NewLabour | Jeff Montgomery | 604 | 2.76 | |
| McGillicuddy Serious | P P Clarke | 175 | 0.80 | |
| Democrats | R Henderson | 49 | 0.22 | |
| Communist League | Janet Roth | 29 | 0.13 | |
| Majority | | 246 | 1.12 | −20.55 |
| Turnout | | 21,913 | 88.67 | −1.43 |
| Registered electors | | 24,714 | | |

=== 1987 election ===
1987 general election: Wellington Central
| Party | Candidate | Votes | % | ±% |
|---|---|---|---|---|
| Labour | Fran Wilde | 13,064 | 54.54 | +6.27 |
| National | John Feast | 7,873 | 32.87 | +14.11 |
| Democrats | M D Binney | 398 | 1.66 | |
| McGillicuddy Serious | Mark Servian | 160 | 0.66 | |
| Wizard Party | Tony Catford | 84 | 0.35 | +0.04 |
| Majority | | 5,191 | 21.67 | +4.51 |
| Turnout | | 21,579 | 90.10 | −5.07 |
| Registered electors | | 23,949 | | |

=== 1984 election ===
1984 general election: Wellington Central
| Party | Candidate | Votes | % | ±% |
|---|---|---|---|---|
| Labour | Fran Wilde | 11,579 | 48.27 | +0.13 |
| National | Rosemary Young-Rouse | 7,463 | 31.11 | |
| NZ Party | John Feast | 4,501 | 18.76 | |
| Social Credit | Murray Belchamber | 314 | 1.30 | |
| Wizard Party | Tony Catford | 76 | 0.31 | −0.03 |
| Independent | Dean Matthews | 51 | 0.21 | |
| Majority | | 4,116 | 17.16 | +11.40 |
| Turnout | | 23,984 | 95.17 | +3.97 |
| Registered electors | | 25,200 | | |

=== 1981 election ===
1981 general election: Wellington Central
| Party | Candidate | Votes | % | ±% |
|---|---|---|---|---|
| Labour | Fran Wilde | 10,719 | 48.14 | |
| National | Ken Comber | 9,436 | 42.38 | −2.39 |
| Social Credit | Malcolm Ross | 1,898 | 8.52 | |
| Independent | Bill Manson | 90 | 0.40 | |
| Wizard Party | Tony Catford | 76 | 0.34 | |
| Independent | J F Stuart | 43 | 0.19 | |
| Majority | | 1,283 | 5.76 | |
| Turnout | | 22,262 | 91.20 | +36.04 |
| Registered electors | | 24,410 | | |

=== 1978 election ===
1978 general election: Wellington Central
| Party | Candidate | Votes | % | ±% |
|---|---|---|---|---|
| National | Ken Comber | 9,741 | 44.77 | −3.38 |
| Labour | Neville Pickering | 8,825 | 40.56 | |
| Social Credit | Ron England | 1,893 | 8.70 | +6.35 |
| Values | Karen Roper | 1,217 | 5.59 | |
| Tory | Mark Gregory Robinson | 51 | 0.23 | |
| Progressive Kiwi | David Mitchell | 29 | 0.13 | +0.07 |
| Majority | | 916 | 4.21 | −1.21 |
| Turnout | | 21,756 | 55.16 | −20.88 |
| Registered electors | | 39,435 | | |

=== 1975 election ===
1975 general election: Wellington Central
| Party | Candidate | Votes | % | ±% |
|---|---|---|---|---|
| National | Ken Comber | 9,553 | 48.15 | +3.27 |
| Labour | David Shand | 8,477 | 42.73 | −2.00 |
| Values | Desmond Kelly | 1,326 | 6.68 | |
| Social Credit | Ron England | 467 | 2.35 | |
| Progressive Kiwi | David Mitchell | 13 | 0.06 | −0.47 |
| Majority | | 1,076 | 5.42 | +5.28 |
| Turnout | | 19,836 | 76.04 | −82.56 |
| Registered electors | | 26,083 | | |

=== 1972 election ===
1972 general election: Wellington Central
| Party | Candidate | Votes | % | ±% |
|---|---|---|---|---|
| National | Ken Comber | 8,088 | 44.88 | |
| Labour | David Shand | 8,061 | 44.73 | |
| Values | Bob Overend | 1,232 | 6.83 | |
| Social Credit | William Roy Hill | 455 | 2.52 | |
| New Democratic | David Mitchell | 97 | 0.53 | |
| Independent | Kevin Alan Brown | 87 | 0.48 | |
| Majority | | 27 | 0.14 | |
| Turnout | | 18,020 | 89.60 | +3.85 |
| Registered electors | | 20,111 | | |

=== 1969 election ===
1969 general election: Wellington Central
| Party | Candidate | Votes | % | ±% |
|---|---|---|---|---|
| National | Dan Riddiford | 8,467 | 51.61 | −0.79 |
| Labour | Olive Smuts-Kennedy | 6,267 | 38.20 | |
| Social Credit | Godfrey Healy | 842 | 5.13 | −0.15 |
| Independent | Mike Mitchell | 489 | 2.98 | |
| Independent | Harry Low | 264 | 1.60 | |
| Socialist Action | George Fyson | 76 | 0.46 | |
| Majority | | 2,200 | 13.41 | +2.09 |
| Turnout | | 16,405 | 85.75 | +5.96 |
| Registered electors | | 19,131 | | |

=== 1966 election ===
1966 general election: Wellington Central
| Party | Candidate | Votes | % | ±% |
|---|---|---|---|---|
| National | Dan Riddiford | 7,927 | 52.40 | −0.26 |
| Labour | Rolland O'Regan | 6,214 | 41.08 | |
| Social Credit | Godfrey Healy | 799 | 5.28 | |
| Democratic | Harry Hughes | 185 | 1.22 | |
| Majority | | 1,713 | 11.32 | +2.35 |
| Turnout | | 15,125 | 79.79 | −8.44 |
| Registered electors | | 18,954 | | |

=== 1963 election ===
1963 general election: Wellington Central
| Party | Candidate | Votes | % | ±% |
|---|---|---|---|---|
| National | Dan Riddiford | 8,852 | 52.66 | +3.57 |
| Labour | Frank Kitts | 7,344 | 43.69 | −2.86 |
| Social Credit | Donald Grooby | 409 | 2.43 | |
| Communist | Kenneth Stanton | 111 | 0.66 | −0.18 |
| Independent | Henry Trewby | 92 | 0.54 | |
| Majority | | 1,508 | 8.97 | +6.44 |
| Turnout | | 16,808 | 88.23 | +3.06 |
| Registered electors | | 19,049 | | |

=== 1960 election ===
1960 general election: Wellington Central
| Party | Candidate | Votes | % | ±% |
|---|---|---|---|---|
| National | Dan Riddiford | 7,373 | 49.09 | |
| Labour | Frank Kitts | 6,992 | 46.55 | −6.37 |
| Social Credit | Arthur Henry Norris | 526 | 3.50 | −0.61 |
| Communist | Kenneth Stanton | 127 | 0.84 | |
| Majority | | 381 | 2.53 | |
| Turnout | | 15,018 | 85.17 | −6.19 |
| Registered electors | | 17,632 | | |

=== 1957 election ===
1957 general election: Wellington Central
| Party | Candidate | Votes | % | ±% |
|---|---|---|---|---|
| Labour | Frank Kitts | 8,980 | 52.92 | +3.45 |
| National | Max Wall | 7,295 | 42.97 | |
| Social Credit | Arthur Henry Norris | 699 | 4.11 | |
| Majority | | 1,685 | 9.92 | +5.92 |
| Turnout | | 16,974 | 91.36 | +6.06 |
| Registered electors | | 18,579 | | |

=== 1954 election ===
1954 general election: Wellington Central
| Party | Candidate | Votes | % | ±% |
|---|---|---|---|---|
| Labour | Frank Kitts | 7,752 | 49.47 | |
| National | Allan Highet | 7,125 | 45.47 | |
| Social Credit | Eric Elliot | 791 | 5.04 | |
| Majority | | 627 | 4.00 | |
| Turnout | | 15,668 | 85.30 | +2.20 |
| Registered electors | | 18,367 | | |

=== 1951 election ===
1951 general election: Wellington Central
| Party | Candidate | Votes | % | ±% |
|---|---|---|---|---|
| Labour | Charles Chapman | 4,463 | 51.61 | −1.40 |
| National | Berta Burns | 4,186 | 48.39 | |
| Majority | | 277 | 3.20 | −2.80 |
| Turnout | | 8,649 | 83.10 | −4.44 |
| Registered electors | | 10,407 | | |

=== 1949 election ===
1949 general election: Wellington Central
| Party | Candidate | Votes | % | ±% |
|---|---|---|---|---|
| Labour | Charles Chapman | 5,078 | 53.01 | −4.82 |
| National | Will Appleton | 4,503 | 46.99 | |
| Majority | | 575 | 6.00 | −9.67 |
| Turnout | | 9,581 | 87.54 | −0.81 |
| Registered electors | | 10,944 | | |

=== 1946 election ===
1946 general election: Wellington Central
| Party | Candidate | Votes | % | ±% |
|---|---|---|---|---|
| Labour | Charles Chapman | 6,201 | 57.83 | |
| National | Agnes Weston (Note: Claude Weston died suddenly on 10 November 1946 and was replaced by his wife) | 4,521 | 42.17 | |
| Majority | | 1,680 | 15.67 | +7.52 |
| Informal votes | | 96 | 0.89 | −0.60 |
| Turnout | | 10,818 | 88.35 | +7.75 |
| Registered electors | | 12,245 | | |

Table footnotes:

=== 1943 election ===
1943 general election: Wellington Central
| Party | Candidate | Votes | % | ±% |
|---|---|---|---|---|
| Labour | Peter Fraser | 6,822 | 46.12 | −16.74 |
| National | Will Appleton | 5,616 | 37.97 | +0.83 |
| Independent | Colin Scrimgeour | 2,253 | 15.23 | |
| Independent | Julius Hyde | 100 | 0.68 | |
| Majority | | 1,206 | 8.15 | −17.57 |
| Informal votes | | 223 | 1.49 | +0.89 |
| Turnout | | 15,014 | 80.59 | +6.15 |
| Registered electors | | 18,629 | | |

=== 1938 election ===
1938 general election: Wellington Central
| Party | Candidate | Votes | % | ±% |
|---|---|---|---|---|
| Labour | Peter Fraser | 9,376 | 62.86 | −6.19 |
| National | Will Appleton | 5,539 | 37.14 | |
| Majority | | 3,837 | 25.73 | −12.37 |
| Informal votes | | 89 | 0.59 | |
| Turnout | | 15,004 | 86.74 | +5.05 |
| Registered electors | | 17,297 | | |

=== 1935 election ===
1935 general election: Wellington Central
| Party | Candidate | Votes | % | ±% |
|---|---|---|---|---|
| Labour | Peter Fraser | 7,673 | 69.43 | 12.17 |
| Reform | Will Mason | 3,380 | 30.57 | |
| Majority | | 4,293 | 38.84 | +16.41 |
| Turnout | | 11,053 | | |

=== 1931 election ===
1931 general election: Wellington Central
| Party | Candidate | Votes | % | ±% |
|---|---|---|---|---|
| Labour | Peter Fraser | 6,308 | 57.26 | −3.55 |
| United | Robert Darroch | 3,837 | 34.83 | |
| Independent | Edward William Nicolaus | 688 | 6.25 | |
| Communist | Richard Francis Griffin | 183 | 1.66 | |
| Majority | | 2,471 | 22.43 | −6.17 |
| Informal votes | | 91 | 0.82 | −0.37 |
| Turnout | | 11,107 | 74.82 | −8.79 |
| Registered electors | | 14,845 | | |

=== 1928 election ===
1928 general election: Wellington Central
| Party | Candidate | Votes | % | ±% |
|---|---|---|---|---|
| Labour | Peter Fraser | 7,353 | 60.81 | |
| Reform | Dunbar Sloane | 3,895 | 32.21 | |
| Independent Labour | Margaret Young | 843 | 6.97 | |
| Majority | | 3,458 | 28.60 | |
| Informal votes | | 145 | 1.19 | |
| Turnout | | 12,236 | 83.61 | |
| Registered electors | | 14,635 | | |

=== 1925 election ===
1925 general election: Wellington Central
| Party | Candidate | Votes | % | ±% |
|---|---|---|---|---|
| Labour | Peter Fraser | 5,459 | 64.02 | −0.71 |
| Reform | Dunbar Sloane | 3,069 | 35.98 | |
| Majority | | 2,390 | 28.02 | −18.65 |
| Turnout | | 8,528 | | |

=== 1922 election ===
1922 general election: Wellington Central
| Party | Candidate | Votes | % | ±% |
|---|---|---|---|---|
| Labour | Peter Fraser | 5,827 | 64.73 | +7.40 |
| Independent | William Bennett | 1,625 | 18.05 | |
| Liberal–Labour | Archie Sievwright | 1,550 | 17.21 | |
| Majority | | 4,202 | 46.67 | +32.03 |
| Informal votes | | 102 | 1.13 | |
| Turnout | | 9,002 | | |

=== 1919 election ===
1919 general election: Wellington Central
| Party | Candidate | Votes | % | ±% |
|---|---|---|---|---|
| Labour | Peter Fraser | 4,486 | 57.33 | +0.79 |
| Liberal | Frederick Pirani | 3,430 | 42.67 | |
| Majority | | 1,146 | 14.64 | −19.77 |
| Turnout | | 7,826 | | |

=== 1918 by-election ===
1918 Wellington Central by-election
| Party | Candidate | Votes | % | ±% |
|---|---|---|---|---|
| Labour | Peter Fraser | 2,660 | 56.00 | |
| Independent Labour | Joe Mack | 1,046 | 22.02 | |
| Liberal | William Hildreth | 783 | 16.48 | |
| Independent | Harry Atmore | 185 | 3.89 | |
| Independent | Lindsay Garmson | 29 | 0.61 | |
| Independent | Cyril Tanner | 8 | 0.16 | |
| Informal votes | | 39 | 0.82 | |
| Majority | | 1,614 | 33.97 | |
| Turnout | | 4,750 | 51.76 | −32.71 |
| Registered electors | | 9,176 | | |
| Labour gain from Liberal | | Swing | | |

=== 1914 election ===
1914 general election: Wellington Central
| Party | Candidate | Votes | % | ±% |
|---|---|---|---|---|
| Liberal | Robert Fletcher | 5,208 | 64.40 | |
| Reform | Francis Fisher | 2,879 | 35.60 | |
| Majority | | 2,329 | 28.80 | |
| Informal votes | | 84 | 1.03 | |
| Turnout | | 8,171 | 84.47 | |
| Registered electors | | 9,673 | | |

=== 1911 election ===
==== First ballot ====
1911 general election: Wellington Central
| Party | Candidate | Votes | % | ±% |
|---|---|---|---|---|
| Reform | Francis Fisher | 2,987 | 39.71 | |
| Liberal | Robert Fletcher | 2,983 | 39.66 | |
| Labour | Tom Young | 1,372 | 18.24 | |
| Socialist | Frank Freeman | 180 | 2.39 | |
| Majority | | 4 | 0.05 | |
| Informal votes | | 121 | 1.58 | |
| Turnout | | 7,643 | 70.89 | |
| Registered electors | | 10,781 | | |

==== Second ballot ====
1911 general election: Wellington Central
| Party | Candidate | Votes | % | ±% |
|---|---|---|---|---|
| Reform | Francis Fisher | 3,813 | 50.87 | |
| Liberal | Robert Fletcher | 3,682 | 49.13 | |
| Majority | | 131 | 1.75 | |
| Informal votes | | 19 | 0.25 | |
| Turnout | | 7,514 | 69.70 | |
| Registered electors | | 10,781 | | |

=== 1905 election ===
1905 general election: Wellington Central
| Party | Candidate | Votes | % | ±% |
|---|---|---|---|---|
| New Liberal | Francis Fisher | 3,142 | 48.63 | |
| Liberal | Patrick O'Regan | 2,698 | 41.76 | |
| Ind. Labour League | Albert Cooper | 243 | 3.76 | |
| Informal votes | | 90 | 1.39 | |
| Majority | | 444 | 6.87 | |
| Turnout | | 6,353 | | |
