= Fran Wilde =

New Zealand politician

The Honourable Dame Fran Wilde DNZM QSO
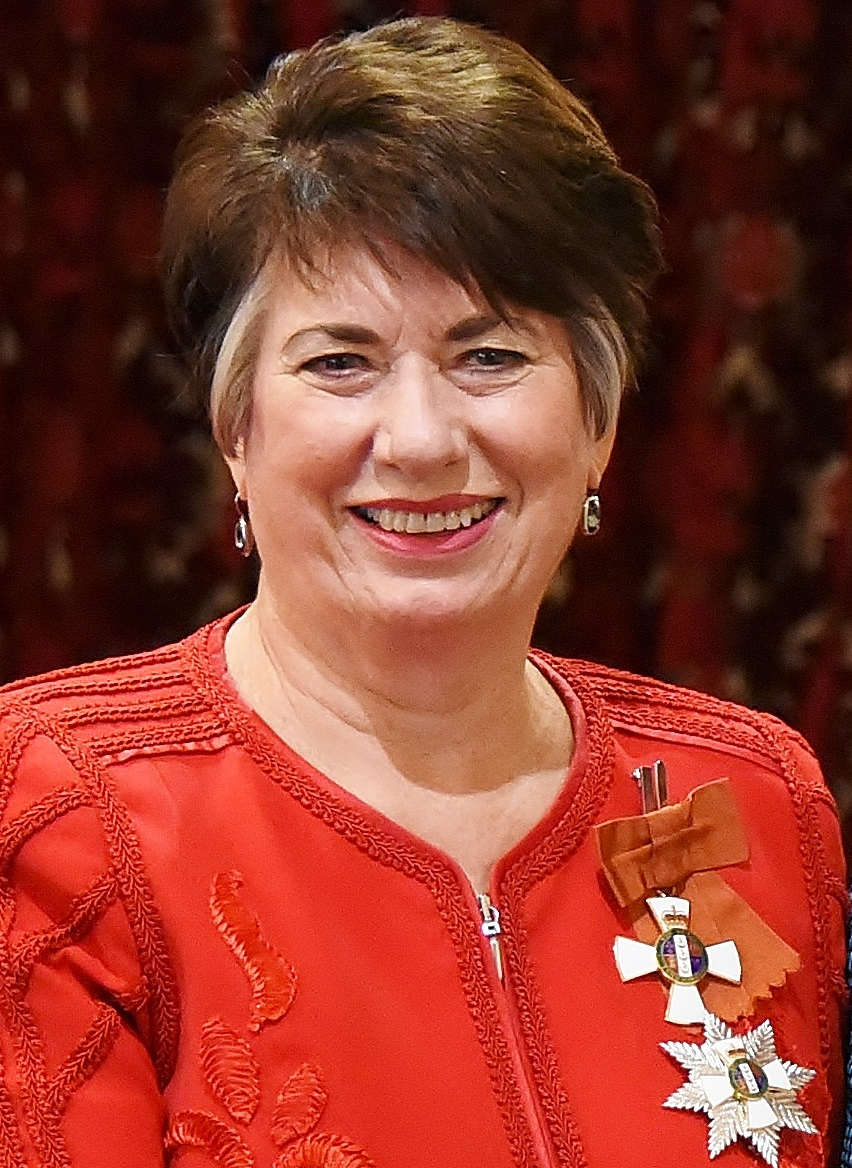
- Wilde in 2017

7th Mayor of South Wairarapa
- Incumbent
- Assumed office October 2025
- Preceded by: Martin Connelly

5th Chairperson of the Wellington Regional Council
- In office 30 October 2007 – 30 June 2015
- Preceded by: Ian Buchanan
- Succeeded by: Chris Laidlaw

31st Mayor of Wellington
- In office 28 October 1992 – 28 October 1995
- Deputy: David Watt
- Preceded by: Jim Belich
- Succeeded by: Mark Blumsky

28th Minister of Tourism
- In office 24 August 1989 – 2 November 1990
- Prime Minister: Geoffrey Palmer; Mike Moore
- Preceded by: Jonathan Hunt
- Succeeded by: John Banks

2nd Minister of Disarmament and Arms Control
- In office 24 August 1989 – 2 November 1990
- Prime Minister: Geoffrey Palmer; Mike Moore
- Preceded by: Russell Marshall
- Succeeded by: Doug Graham

Member of the New Zealand Parliament for Wellington Central
- In office 28 November 1981 – 10 October 1992
- Preceded by: Ken Comber
- Succeeded by: Chris Laidlaw

Personal details
- Born: Frances Helen Kitching; 11 November 1948 (age 78) Wellington, New Zealand
- Party: Labour
- Education: Victoria University

Dame Frances Helen Wilde DNZM QSO (née Kitching, born 11 November 1948) is a New Zealand politician. She was elected mayor of South Wairarapa in October 2025.

Wilde was first elected to the New Zealand House of Representatives in 1981 as the Labour Party member of parliament in Wellington Central. She achieved legislative success promoting the Homosexual Law Reform Act 1986 and subsequently served as Minister of Disarmament and Arms Control and Minister of Tourism in the Fourth Labour Government. She resigned her seat after being elected mayor of Wellington in 1992, a position she held for a single term.

Wilde returned to politics in 2004, winning a seat on the Greater Wellington Regional Council which she chaired from 2007 to 2015. She led an unsuccessful attempt to amalgamate the nine councils in the Wellington region.

== Early life and career ==
Wilde was born Frances Helen Kitching on 11 November 1948 in Wellington, New Zealand. She attended St Mary's College and later at Wellington Polytechnic (gaining a diploma in journalism) and Victoria University (graduating with a degree in political science). Upon finishing her education Wilde gained employment as a journalist.

In 1968, she married Geoffrey Gilbert Wilde, and the couple went on to have three children before divorcing in 1983.

She joined the Labour Party in 1972 and was later the editor of the party newsletter, New Nation. She later became the chairperson of the electorate in which she resided and a member of Labour's executive council in the Wellington region.

== Political career ==
=== Member of Parliament and Minister ===
New Zealand Parliament
Years	Term	Electorate	Party
1981–1984	40th	Wellington Central	Labour
1984–1987	41st	Wellington Central	Labour
1987–1990	42nd	Wellington Central	Labour
1990–1992	43rd	Wellington Central	Labour

Wilde was a Member of Parliament for the Wellington Central seat, winning it from sitting National MP Ken Comber in the 1981 general election. In 1983 she was appointed as Labour's spokesperson for State Services by Labour leader David Lange. Wilde retained the seat at the subsequent 1984 general election. She was Labour's junior Parliamentary Whip from 1984 to 1987.

In 1985, Wilde moved what became the Homosexual Law Reform Act 1986, which legalised homosexual acts in New Zealand between consenting men. The 16-month debate about the bill polarised the country, and sparked violent demonstrations and angry rallies at Parliament. Her other main legislative achievement in Parliament was an Adoption Reform Act, which made it possible for adopted people and their birth-parents to contact each other.

From 1987 Wilde served as an Associate Minister outside Cabinet in the Foreign Affairs, Housing, Conservation and Pacific Island Affairs portfolios and Minister for Disarmament and Arms Control in the second term of the Fourth Labour Government. When Geoffrey Palmer became Prime Minister, Wilde was promoted into Cabinet and appointed Minister of Tourism alongside her continuing roles as Minister for Disarmament and Arms Control and Associate Minister of External Affairs and Trade. Between 1990 and 1992, in opposition, she was Labour's spokesperson for Tourism, Disarmament and Ethnic Affairs.

=== Mayor of Wellington ===
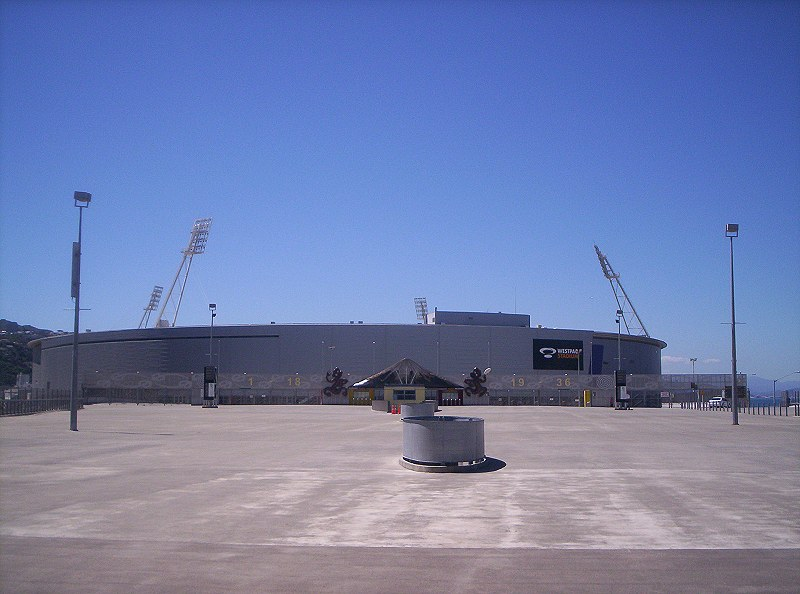
Fran Wilde Walk, the accessway to Sky Stadium

In 1992 she resigned from Parliament to stand for Mayor of Wellington. Her seat was retained by Labour, with Chris Laidlaw winning the 1992 by-election caused by Wilde's resignation. She won the Mayoralty, and during her time as Mayor, Wilde worked to improve Wellington's image and continuing on from the city's strong anti-nuclear sentiments she declared Wellington a Peace Capital in 1993. Wilde also spearheaded initiatives like the planning and construction of the WestpacTrust Stadium which features an elevated accessway to its entrance known as the "Fran Wilde Walk" which was opened in June 2005.

In 1995 Wilde was not renominated by the Labour Party with local members opining that she had drifted too far from Labour policies during her term as mayor. Instead members nominated Eastern ward councillor Hazel Armstrong, though she declined to stand for mayor. Wilde responded by stating if she decided to stand for a second term, she would stand as an independent. She made clear she still supported the Labour Party and praised its leader Helen Clark and her leadership of the party. Clark said Wilde would have her support if she decided to run as an independent candidate. Ultimately Wilde retired from the role after just one term. When standing in 1992 she intended to run for a second term and stated the decision not to run again was the hardest decision she ever had to make. She cited a wish to gain more privacy and the only way to do so would be to leave the mayoralty. The Labour Party eventually chose Elizabeth Tennet, the Member of Parliament for Island Bay, as its candidate for the election. Wilde did not support Tennet's candidacy thinking she was not right for the role and she was only standing for mayor because the Island Bay seat was being abolished at the next general election. Tennet and another MP, Graham Kelly, described Wilde as a turncoat for her criticisms.

After leaving the mayoralty Wilde was appointed the chair of the Housing New Zealand board and, from 1997 to 2003, chief executive of Trade New Zealand.

=== Greater Wellington Regional Council ===
Wilde returned to local politics in 2004, successfully contesting a seat on the Wellington Regional Council. It had been suggested that she would retire after a single term; however, Wilde was re-elected to the Regional Council in 2007 and was elected, by her fellow councillors, the chair of the council on 30 October that year. She was returned as both a councillor and the chair in 2010 and 2013.

Wilde was a strong proponent of the super city proposal for Wellington. When the Local Government Commission rejected the proposal, Wilde received a letter signed by nine of her fellow councillors asking her to stand down as chair. Wilde stepped down from the chair's position from 30 June 2015, but remained a regional councillor. She was succeeded as chair by Chris Laidlaw and did not stand for re-election in 2016.

=== District Health Board ===
Wilde contested and was elected to the Capital and Coast District Health Board in 2016 and was appointed the deputy chair of the board. Wilde did not seek re-election in 2019.

=== South Wairarapa mayoralty ===
Wilde contested the South Wairarapa mayoralty in the 2025 local election. She was successful, beating businesswoman Leah Hawkins.

== Career outside politics ==
Following her departure from the Regional Council, Wilde was appointed as the Chair of the Remuneration Authority. She has also served as the deputy chair and acting chair of the NZ Transport Agency.

Wilde was appointed to the board of the Museum of New Zealand Te Papa Tongarewa in 2015. She became the board's deputy chair in January 2019, and has been its chair since 1 July 2019.

Wilde is on the board of Kiwi Can Do, an organisation which helps unemployed New Zealanders get back into work.

Wilde was appointed chairperson of the Royal New Zealand Plunket Trust in November 2020.

== Honours ==
In 1993, Wilde was awarded the New Zealand Suffrage Centennial Medal. Wilde was appointed a Companion of the Queen's Service Order for public services in the 1996 New Year Honours; a Companion of the New Zealand Order of Merit in the 2012 New Year Honours for services to local-body affairs and the community; and a Dame Companion of the New Zealand Order of Merit in 2017 for services to the State and the community.

== Family ==
She has three adult children from her first marriage to Geoffrey Wilde. Her husband Christopher Kelly, a former veterinary surgeon, was CEO of Landcorp.

== See also ==
- LGBT rights in New Zealand

== Notes ==
New Zealand Parliament
Preceded by Ken Comber	Member of Parliament for Wellington Central; 1981–1992	Succeeded by Chris Laidlaw
Political offices
Preceded by Russell Marshall	Minister of Disarmament and Arms Control; 1989–1990	Succeeded by Doug Graham
Preceded by Jonathan Hunt	Minister of Tourism; 1989–1990	Succeeded by John Banks
Preceded by Jim Belich	Mayor of Wellington; 1992–1995	Succeeded by Mark Blumsky
Preceded by Ian Buchanan	Chairperson of the Wellington Regional Council; 2007–2015	Succeeded by Chris Laidlaw
