= Sue Kedgley =

New Zealand politician

Sue Kedgley ONZM
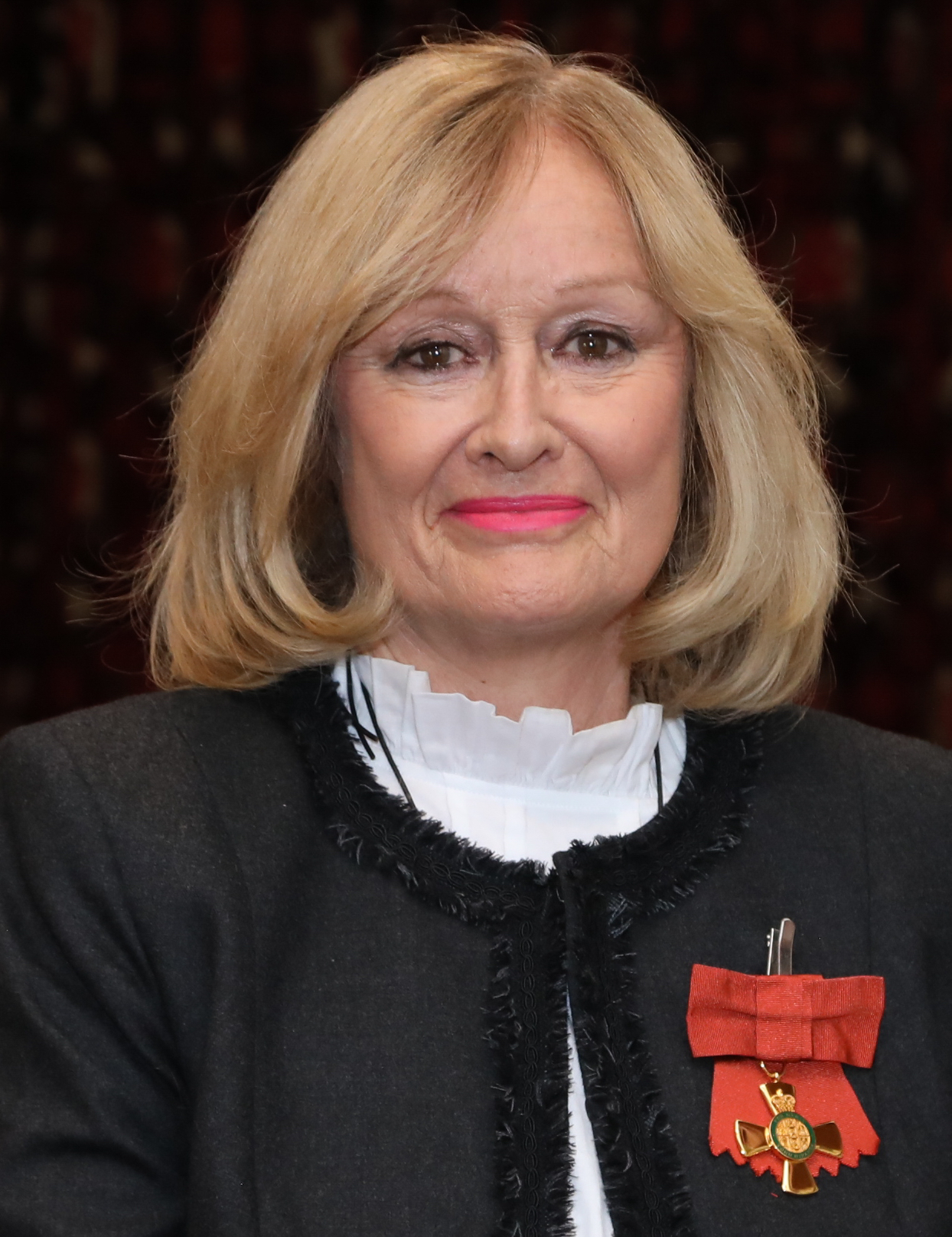
- Kedgley in 2020

Member of the Wellington Regional Council
- In office 12 October 2013 – 12 October 2019
- Constituency: Wellington City

Member of the New Zealand Parliament for Green Party List
- In office 27 November 1999 – 26 November 2011

Member of the Wellington City Council
- In office 10 October 1992 – 10 December 1999
- Preceded by: Nic Dalton
- Succeeded by: Ray Ahipene-Mercer
- Constituency: Eastern Ward

Personal details
- Born: 1948 (age 77–78)
- Party: Green Party
- Other political affiliations: Labour Party (former)
- Spouse: Denis Foot
- Children: One
- Education: Victoria University, University of Auckland, University of Otago
- Occupation: Central and local government politician, author, activist
- Website: www.suekedgley.com

Susan Jane Kedgley ONZM (born 1948) is a New Zealand politician, food campaigner and author. Before entering politics Kedgley worked for the United Nations in New York for 8 years and for a decade as a television reporter, director and producer in New Zealand.

== Biography ==
=== Early life and career ===
Kedgley stated she had a sheltered upbringing being given a 'proper' girls upbringing and was a debutante. Along with her twin sister Helen Kedgley, she went to Samuel Marsden Collegiate School and later Victoria University. While studying at Victoria she became interested in politics. Kedgley became involved in student politics and was a member of the Victoria University of Wellington Students' Association from 1967 to 1969. She then studied at the University of Auckland and in 1971, while still a student, she joined Women's Movement for Freedom, a group formed in 1970 by Patricia Enting. In 1971, Enting handed over the leadership of the group to Kedgely, who renamed it Women's Liberation. That same year she stood for the Auckland City Council as a Labour Party candidate. Kedgley's Master of Arts thesis in political science was submitted to the University of Otago in 1972.

Kedgley was employed as a researcher on the show Checkpoint. She was unable to become a presenter, being told at the time that women couldn't because their voices "aren't deep enough and they lack authority". Kedgley has written a number of books on feminist issues, and was one of the founding leaders of the women's liberation movement in New Zealand. Her book, titled Eating Safely in a Toxic World, set the scene in New Zealand for a new movement of 'safe-food campaigners'.

Her autobiography Fifty Years a Feminist was published in 2021.

=== Political career ===
==== Local body politics ====
In 1992 Kedgley, having left Labour to join the incipient Green Party, was elected the Wellington City Council (WCC). She remained a member for 7 years and was the founder and co-convenor of the New Zealand Safe Food Campaign. While on the WCC, Kedgley held the roles of chairperson, Consultation Committee, 1996–1998 and chairperson, Transport and Infrastructure Committee, 1998–1999. She resigned from the council in December 1999 after winning a parliamentary seat, saying it would be impossible to carry out both roles successfully at once. Before leaving she pushed for a by-election to be held to replace her rather than an appointment. The Green Party did not stand a candidate and both the party and Kedgley endorsed independent candidate Ray Ahipene-Mercer, an environmentalist, who won the seat.

==== Member of Parliament ====
New Zealand Parliament
Years	Term	Electorate	List	Party
1999–2002	46th	List	6	Green
2002–2005	47th	List	5	Green
2005–2008	48th	List	4	Green
2008–2011	49th	List	5	Green

Kedgley represented the Green Party in the New Zealand Parliament since first becoming a Member of Parliament as a list MP in the 1999 election until 2011. She won re-election in the 2002, 2005 and 2008 general elections. Particular political interests include health, food safety, animal welfare, consumer affairs, transport and women's issues.

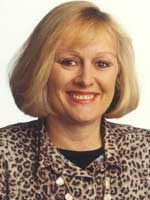
Kedgley in 2005

In 2005 her Employment Relations (Flexible Working Arrangements) Amendment Bill, granting employees with dependants the right to request part-time or flexible hours, was drawn from the member's ballot. The bill was eventually passed as the Employment Relations (Flexible Working Arrangements) Amendment Act 2007.

In 2006 her Consumer's Right to Know (Food Information) Bill was drawn from the member's ballot, but was defeated at its first reading.

Kedgley was the Chairperson of the New Zealand Parliament Health Committee from 2005 to 2008 and was the Deputy Chair for 6 years prior.

In September 2010 she announced that she would not be standing for re-election in the 2011 general election. She gave her valedictory speech on 27 September.

==== Return to local government ====
In July 2013, Kedgley announced that she would be running for the Greater Wellington Regional Council on a Green Party ticket in the Wellington ward. She won a position on the Regional Council as well as the Capital and Coast District Health Board in the October elections. She announced that she would not stand for re-election to the Regional Council in 2019, but will contest the District Health Board. She was re-elected to the District Health Board at the 2019 elections.

As of 2021 Kedgley is on the board of Consumer NZ having been elected in 2013.

== Honours and awards ==
In 2016, Kedgley received the New Zealand Women of Influence Award for Diversity in recognition of her work towards greater gender diversity in the workplace. In the 2020 New Year Honours, she was appointed an Officer of the New Zealand Order of Merit, for services to women and governance.

== Personal life ==
In 1990 she married Wellington lawyer and former Wellington City and Regional Councillor, Denis Foot, and they have one son.

Foot was a Wellington City Councillor from 1971 to 1977 representing the Citizens' Association when he stood down. In 1980 he was elected for another spell on the city council as well as to the Wellington Regional Council, stepping down in 1983. At the 1990 election he stood in the Miramar electorate as the Green Party candidate, placing third. At the 1992 local elections he stood successfully again for the regional council, this time for the Green Party, and was re-elected in 1995 before retiring in 1998.

Political offices
Preceded by Nic Dalton	Wellington City Councillor for Eastern Ward; 1992–1999	Succeeded by Ray Ahipene-Mercer
