= 2022 Wellington mayoral election =

New Zealand local election

- 8 October 2022
- Turnout: 72,025 (43.27%)
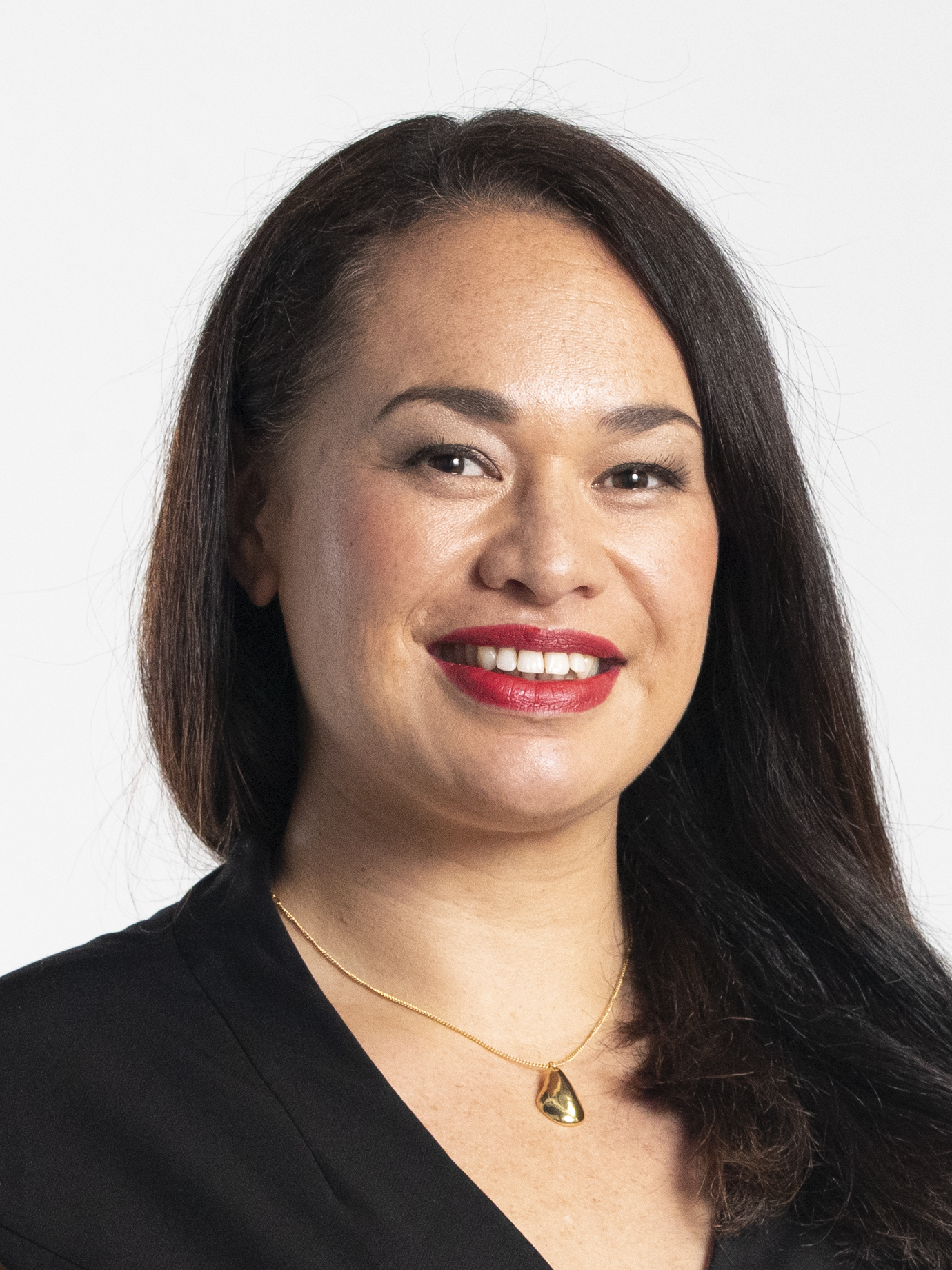

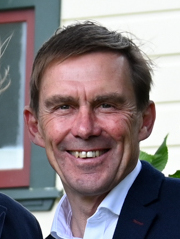

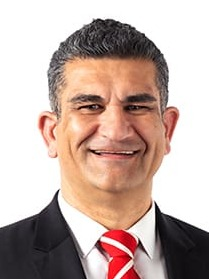
Candidate	Tory Whanau	Andy Foster	Paul Eagle
Party	Independent	Independent	Independent
Primary vote	30,656	11,835	11,935
Percentage	42.56%	16.43%	16.57%
Final count	34,462	16,711	14,589
Percentage	52.40%	25.41%	22.18%
Mayor before election
Andy Foster
Elected mayor
Tory Whanau

The 2022 Wellington mayoral election was a local election held from 16 September to 8 October in Wellington, New Zealand, as part of that year's city council election and nation-wide local elections. Voters elected the mayor of Wellington for the 2022–2025 term of the Wellington City Council. Postal voting and the single transferable vote system was used.

Tory Whanau, an independent that was endorsed by the Green Party, won in the seventh iteration, defeating the incumbent Andy Foster and Labour-endorsed independent Paul Eagle in a landslide.

== Background ==
Andy Foster was first elected to Wellington City Council in the 1992 elections, and served continuously until he was elected mayor in the 2019 election. Despite Foster's centre-right position, a majority centre-left council was elected in the 2019 local elections.

Infighting amongst the council was reported in February 2021, after councillor Fleur Fitzsimons reported Foster to the Auditor-General over his proposal to privatise the city's main library; she said there was decision-making and governance inconsistent with the Local Government Act 2002.

Shortly afterwards, Foster announced an independent review of the council's governance. The review found issues with the council including with its governance structure, direction and oversight, that some council staff felt unsafe in giving free and frank advice.

=== Electoral system ===
The mayor is elected at large using the single transferable vote system. Under the Local Government Act 2002, candidates were allowed to spend up to $60,000 on the campaign.

== Campaign ==
=== Paul Eagle ===
Eagle announced his campaign and his endorsement by the Labour Party on 26 June 2022. Eagle ran on a "back to basics" platform, focusing on repairing city infrastructure. He took leave as an MP from 8 July to campaign, and donated to charity his salary for that period. Eagle spent $57,733 on his campaign.

=== Andy Foster ===
Foster announced his intention to seek re-election on 7 July 2022 on Newstalk ZB. He spent $54,108, including $17,000 on billboards.

=== Tory Whanau ===
Whanau announced her entry into the race on 18 November 2021, and was endorsed by the Green Party in April 2022. She formally launched her campaign on 30 June 2022. Georgina Campbell of The New Zealand Herald wrote that Whanau's early announcement helped her to overcome low name recognition. Whanau utilised street-level posters around the city to advertise. Whanau spent $59,844, which included $23,000 on street-level posters and $15,000 on digital billboards.

=== Issues and positions ===
In May 2022, The Dominion Post reporter Tom Hunt identified the top election issues as public safety, commercial vibrancy, housing affordability, transport, rates, water infrastructure, climate change and council culture. The council indicated in its pre-election report that the biggest issues facing the city are infrastructure and planning for growth, resilience and adaptability, the economy, funding and resourcing and the changing local government sector. A poll of voters by Q+A and Kantar found that water infrastructure was the top issue, followed by climate change adaptation, road maintenance, reducing rates, and public transport investment.

On 18 August, The Dominion Post reported mayoral and council candidate Barbara McKenzie as being an anti-vaxxer, not denying forming part of Voices for Freedom, and avowing support for 6 January U.S. Capitol rioters.

==== Transport ====
Let's Get Wellington Moving, a programme of infrastructure works proposed by a consortium of Wellington City Council, Greater Wellington Regional Council and Waka Kotahi, includes a proposed light rail line from the city centre to Island Bay and a second tunnel through Mount Victoria. Eagle, Foster and Whanau all expressed support for the project, however Eagle and Whanau called for a review of the 60:40 funding split between central and local government. Chung stated a preference for bus rapid transit over light rail, and Dudfield stood for a significant modification of the proposal to focus on road traffic.

Whanau supported the completion of the Paneke Pōneke cycleway network, while Eagle opposed it and Foster called for a refocus of how it is being delivered.

Whanau campaigned for extending the pedestrian zone of Cuba Street and trialling the use of Low Traffic Neighbourhoods in suburban areas.

==== Water infrastructure ====
The Sixth Labour Government of New Zealand is proposing a Three Waters reform programme to centralise water management infrastructure between territorial authorities. Foster cautiously opposed the reforms "as they stand", supporting co-governance but favouring a review into local government and amendments to the Resource Management Act. Eagle and Whanau supported the reform programme.

== List of candidates ==
Nine candidates were nominated for the mayoralty.

Candidate	Image	Affiliation	Notes
Ellen Blake		Independent	Wellington coordinator of Living Streets Aotearoa
Ray Chung		Independent	founder of the Onslow Residents' Community Association
Chris Dudfield		Independent – Vision/Skill/Results	Architect
Paul Eagle		Independent	Labour MP and former deputy mayor, endorsed by the Labour Party
Andy Foster		Together for Wellington	Incumbent mayor
Kelvin Hastie		Future Wellington	Founder of Predator Free Wellington
Donald McDonald		Our truth all but whole truth	Perennial candidate
Barbara McKenzie		Independent	Founder of the Wellington Significant Natural Areas (SNA) Committee. Anti-vaccination activist.
Tory Whanau		Independent	Former Green Party chief of staff, endorsed by the party for the election.

=== Declined to be candidates ===
- Diane Calvert, city councillor
- Jenny Condie, city councillor
- Jill Day, city councillor
- Fleur Fitzsimons, city councillor
- Laurie Foon, city councillor
- Sarah Free, deputy mayor
- Nick Leggett, former mayor of Porirua
- Justin Lester, former mayor
- Iona Pannett, city councillor
- Tamatha Paul, city councillor
- Simon Woolf, city councillor
- Nicola Young, city councillor

== Debates ==
Date	Organiser(s)	Moderator	Location	Participants		
Date	Organiser(s)	Moderator	Location	Eagle	Foster	Whanau
31 August	Radio Waatea; Te Upoko o Te Ika	Shane Te Pou	Wharewaka Function Centre	Present	Present	Present
5 September	Inner City Wellington	Stephen King	St Peter's Church	Present	Present	Present
7 September	The Dominion Post	Anna Fifield	Stuff newsroom	Present	Present	Present
8 September	The New Zealand Herald; Wellington Chamber of Commerce	Georgina Campbell	Rutherford House, Victoria University of Wellington	Present	Present	Present
8 September	Aro Valley Community Centre	Bryan Crump	Lychgate Funeral Home	Present	Present	Present
14 September	Arts Wellington	Courtney Johnston	Te Whaea	Present	Present	Present
15 September	The Spinoff	Toby Manhire	Meow	Present	Present	Present
21 September	Morning Report	Susie Ferguson	Radio New Zealand	Present	Present	Present
24 September	Newshub Nation	Conor Whitten	Newshub	Present	Present	Present

== Polling ==
Date	Polling organisation	MOE	Iteration	Ellen Blake	Ray Chung	Chris Dudfield	Kelvin Hastie	Paul Eagle	Andy Foster	Donald McDonald	Barbara McKenzie	Tory Whanau
31 August – 8 September 2022	Q+A–Kantar	±4.4	First	3	13	2	2	28	20	1	5	26
31 August – 8 September 2022	Q+A–Kantar	±4.4	Last	—N/a	—N/a	—N/a	—N/a	51	—N/a	—N/a	—N/a	49

== Results ==
2022 Wellington City mayoral election
Party	Candidate	FPv%	Count						
Party	Candidate	FPv%	1	2	3	4	5	6	7
Independent	Tory Whanau	42.56	30,656	30,762	31,176	31,330	32,027	32,317	34,462
Together for Wellington	Andy Foster	16.43	11,835	11,878	11,987	12,105	12,476	12,916	16,711
Independent	Paul Eagle	16.57	11,935	11,974	12,097	12,213	12,519	12,783	14,589
Independent	Ray Chung	14.41	10,383	10,436	10,524	10,979	11,285	12,670	
Independent – Vision/Skill/Results	Chris Dudfield	3.51	2,535	2,553	2,585	2,754	2,960		
Future Wellington	Kelvin Hastie	2.73	1,971	2,001	2,135	2,208			
Independent	Barbara McKenzie	1.69	1,224	1,253	1,341				
Independent	Ellen Blake	1.52	1,101	1,116					
Our truth all but whole truth	Don McDonald	0.53	385						
Valid: 72,025 Spoilt: 103 Quota: 32,881 Turnout: 43.27%

== Aftermath ==
Whanau's win saw her become the first Māori mayor of Wellington, and the first person since Mark Blumsky in 1995 to be elected mayor of Wellington without experience as a city councillor. Her win was described as a landslide victory, and the most decisive since Wellington began using STV in 2004. Eagle's third-place finish was described as an upset.

The 2022 mayoral elections generally saw a swing to the political right, with Whanau's win an exception to that trend. Both of the highest-polling candidates supported expansion of cycleways and mass transit. All candidates agreed on further investment in 'pipes' to improve water infrastructure. Voters preferred candidates whose position on Three Waters reform was of mild opposition (Foster) or supportive. Strong opponents of the reform such as Dudfield polled relatively poorly.

Whanau credited her campaign's success to its mobilisation of voters, and commentators described the election result as a vote for change, and consistent with a desire to 'fix what was going wrong' in water, transport, and housing. Lara Greaves from the University of Auckland stated that Whanau's early declaration of her intention to run for mayor helped to increase her visibility. Eagle conceded that his centrist campaign was the wrong strategy.
