= Paul Eagle =

New Zealand politician

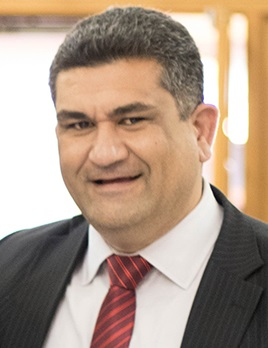
- Eagle in 2016

Member of the New Zealand Parliament for Rongotai
- In office 23 September 2017 – 14 October 2023
- Preceded by: Annette King
- Succeeded by: Julie Anne Genter

24th Deputy Mayor of Wellington
- In office 26 October 2016 – 27 September 2017
- Mayor: Justin Lester
- Preceded by: Justin Lester
- Succeeded by: Jill Day

Wellington City Councillor for the Southern Ward
- In office 9 October 2010 – 27 September 2017 Serving with David Lee (2013–2017) Bryan Pepperell (2010–2013)
- Preceded by: Celia Wade-Brown
- Succeeded by: Fleur Fitzsimons

Personal details
- Born: 10 January 1972 (age 54)
- Party: Labour
- Spouse: Miriam Eagle
- Children: 1
- Education: University of Auckland

Tahere Paul Eagle (born 10 January 1972) is a New Zealand politician and former member of the New Zealand House of Representatives for the Rongotai electorate from 2017 to 2023. He was a Wellington City Councillor from 2010 to 2017 and was the first person of Māori descent to be Deputy Mayor of Wellington, but was defeated in a landslide when he sought the mayoralty as an independent candidate in 2022.

== Early life and career ==
Eagle was adopted by a Methodist minister and his wife, a hospital worker. Eagle has kept contact with his birth mother who told him she couldn't keep him due to the lack of a domestic purposes benefit. When Eagle was five, his adoptive father ran for the Mt Eden Borough Council as a candidate for the Labour Party, he was unsuccessful. When he was 12 the family relocated to Wellington, where he became socially and politically active and agitated against the 1981 Springbok tour.

Eagle was educated first at Wellington High School and then at St. Patrick's College in Wellington, where he showed an aptitude for art, leading him to study the subject at the Elam School of Fine Arts and the University of Auckland. He graduated with a postgraduate diploma in fine arts from the University of Auckland in 1996. He found employment in the desktop publishing design profession before working for Auckland City Council, Wellington City Council, Manukau City Council, Sport and Recreation New Zealand and the Ministry of Economic Development, mostly in event management roles. He later worked for the New Zealand Police as a civilian in the Māori, Pacific and ethnic team.

== Political career ==
=== Wellington City Council ===
Eagle was first elected as a Labour Party candidate to the southern ward of Wellington City Council in 2010, replacing long-time Green Party councillor Celia Wade-Brown who was that year elected mayor. Eagle was re-elected in 2013 and in 2016 with increased majorities. In his second term, he chaired the council's community, sport and recreation committee.

In May 2015, he announced he would be the running mate on conservative councillor Nicola Young's upcoming 2016 mayoral bid. However, the following March, Eagle changed his allegiance to support fellow Labour Party councillor Justin Lester's mayoral campaign, stating that he had agreed to support Young in the absence of a Labour candidate but he "should have gone to the party [to check] first." Lester was elected mayor and appointed Eagle as both the deputy mayor and the chair of the mayor's taskforce on housing.

As a councillor, Eagle supported the introduction of stronger rental housing quality standards, opposed the development of a controversial cycleway through his home suburb of Island Bay and voted for the sale and lease of council-held land at Shelly Bay for a controversial housing development. Mid-term appraisal panels coordinated by local media rated him as the best-performing member of the council in both 2012 and 2015.

Eagle resigned his seat on the council after his election to Parliament, necessitating a by-election in his ward. The by-election was won by Fleur Fitzsimons of the Labour Party, who received Eagle's endorsement.

=== Member of Parliament ===
New Zealand Parliament
Years	Term	Electorate	List	Party
2017–2020	52nd	Rongotai	34	Labour
2020–2023	53rd	Rongotai	47	Labour

Upon the announcement that Rongotai MP Annette King intended to stand in the 2017 general election as a list MP only, Eagle stated that he had encouragement from local constituents to stand for King's seat. He said that he had not yet decided whether or not to contest the Labour nomination for the electorate. Labour leader Andrew Little, who lived in the electorate, was also considered as a potential candidate but after Little announced he was not intending to stand in the seat, Eagle confirmed he would seek the nomination. He also announced that he had the full backing of Wellington Mayor Justin Lester, and if he was successful in entering Parliament he would step down from the position of deputy mayor.

On 3 February 2017 Eagle was confirmed as the sole applicant for the Rongotai candidacy and nominated unopposed. Eagle was also ranked 34 on Labour's party list for the election. His decision to contest the election while continuing to hold office as deputy mayor was criticised by right-wing lobby group the Taxpayers' Union. Eagle's National Party opponent Christopher Finlayson commented on his rival in his 2022 memoir, writing: "Paul is a nice guy and I enjoyed being on the campaign trail with him. At one stage at a meeting with left-wingers in Happy Valley, he whispered, 'When is this dreadful meeting going to finish?'" Finlayson also recalled having to whisper Labour's arts policy to Eagle when the latter did not know the answer to an audience member's question. Eagle won the seat with a 10,900 majority on 23 September and resigned from the council on 27 September. He was the first male Māori candidate for the Labour Party to be elected to a general electorate for nearly a hundred years.

During the 2020 general election, Eagle was re-elected in Rongotai by a final margin of 19,207 votes. A list ranking of 47, lower than the previous election, was described by Eagle as a sign of the party's confidence in his ability to hold the seat. His personal policy of fast-tracking the development of a second Mount Victoria tunnel was at odds with his party's position. Since Eagle left the city council in 2017, mayor Justin Lester had suffered a shock defeat to Andy Foster in the 2019 election and Eagle had been frequently speculated as a possibility to run against Foster. During the 2020 Rongotai campaign Eagle was asked by fellow candidates Geoff Simmons and Nicole McKee to rule out running for the Wellington mayoralty in 2022, which he did after further questioning by journalists.

In his two terms as a Member of Parliament, Eagle served on the governance and administration, transport and infrastructure and Māori affairs committees, and was deputy chair of the economic development, science and innovation committee from November 2017 to August 2018.

Eagle took leave from Parliament between July and October 2022 to campaign, unsuccessfully, to be Mayor of Wellington. On 13 December 2022, Eagle announced that he would not be contesting the 2023 New Zealand general election.

=== Candidacy for Mayor of Wellington ===
Despite directly ruling it out during the 2020 general election campaign (stating, ”Yes, I will [rule it out]"), on 27 June 2022 Eagle announced he had changed his mind and would run for mayor in the 2022 election. Prior to the announcement, it had been widely speculated he would run for months, with media labelling it an "open secret" or "Wellington's worst-kept secret". He ran as an independent candidate, but was endorsed by the Labour Party. From 8 July 2022 he took three months of leave from Parliament to focus on his mayoral campaign, donating nearly $24,000 from his parliamentary salary for the three months to charity. He promised that if successful, he would leave parliament, which would have triggered a by-election in the seat of Rongotai. His key campaign pledges were to bring the council "back to basics", to create a new city development authority and to improve the city's main arts and events precinct.

Eagle's campaign was marred with controversy. Before he had announced his candidacy, a taxpayer-funded survey asking his constituents for opinions on what should be Eagle's priorities as local MP was criticised as being used to inform a possible mayoral campaign. Immediately after the campaign launch, a disagreement with the council about the applicability and enforceability of its election signage policy was documented through local media. A social media post promoting the redevelopment of the Mount Victoria Tunnel was taken down after an accompanying image depicted Eagle standing in front of the Karori tunnel. Tweets sent by Eagle seven years earlier likening council staff who were developing the Island Bay cycleway to the Gestapo also resurfaced. Three weeks before the election, several independent candidates alleged that Eagle had encouraged them to run and provided them with campaign advice. Eagle's Labour endorsement meant he was expected to endorse Labour's candidates. Eagle denied "shoulder-tapping" alternative candidates but at one community meeting endorsed independent Diane Calvert over Labour candidate Rebecca Matthews.

Eagle was ultimately unsuccessful in his campaign, placing third after new candidate Tory Whanau and incumbent Andy Foster. On provisional results released on election day, Eagle was recorded as coming fourth behind Ray Chung although special votes counted later reversed their positions. Within two days, Eagle removed all references of his mayoral candidacy from his social media accounts.

One commentator suggested that the poor result was the result of “positioning himself as the continuity candidate” in an election where similar candidates struggled. “That speaks to probably a wider issue with his strategy, because we knew what Paul Eagle was against – he was against cycleways, he was against housing intensification. But it was less clear to Wellingtonians – and probably people watching outside of Wellington – what he was for.”

== Post-political career ==
In August 2023, shortly after delivering his valedictory speech to Parliament, Eagle was appointed chief executive of the Chatham Islands Council. The Chatham Islands formed part of his electorate during his six years in Parliament. The New Zealand Herald and Stuff reported that Eagle would be the first former Member of Parliament to serve as a local government chief executive.

Media outlet Newsroom noted only a few days after Eagle's appointment as chief executive, that the Chatham Islands was uniquely exempted from the Labour Government's Three Waters horizontal infrastructure reforms. Opposition MPs called for this exemption to be extended to other small and isolated communities. Eagle defended the special treatment of the Chathams, and the wider water reforms, saying any repeal "for the Chathams... would delay putting in place some of the infrastructure that’s needed."

In December 2025, the Controller and Auditor-General of New Zealand launched an investigation into the Council's "sensitive expenditure and procurement" policies. Eagle declined to comment on the investigation, citing the Auditor-General's confidentiality policies. Eagle announced he would step down as council chief executive at the end of February 2026. In mid-March 2026, Auditor-General Grant Taylor released his report which found that the previous Chatham Islands Mayor Monique Croon had allocated NZ$500,000 worth of funding from the Council's expenditure to renovate his council-owned house with new bathroom fittings, stainless steel benches, cabinets and NZ$18,000 worth of high-end Miele kitchen appliances. This funding allocation had come at a time when the cash-strapped Chatham Islands Council had been unable to fund and provide basic services. In February 2026, the incumbent Mayor Greg Horler had sought and obtained Eagle's resignation after obtaining a draft copy of the Auditor-General's report.

== Personal life ==
Eagle lives in Wellington with his wife Miriam Eagle, who is an environmental scientist, and their adopted son. He is Māori of Waikato-Tainui.

New Zealand Parliament
Preceded by Annette King	Member of Parliament for Rongotai; 2017–2023	Succeeded by Julie Anne Genter
Political offices
Preceded by Justin Lester	Deputy Mayor of Wellington; 2016–2017	Succeeded by Jill Day
Preceded by Celia Wade-Brown	Wellington City Councillor for Southern Ward; 2010–2017	Succeeded by Fleur Fitzsimons
