= Rongotai (electorate) =

- Single-member general constituency for the New Zealand House of Representatives
- Formation: 1996
- Region: Wellington; Chatham Islands
- Character: Urban
- Term: 3 years

Member for Rongotai

Rongotai was a New Zealand electorate, returning a single member to the New Zealand House of Representatives. The current MP for Rongotai is Julie Anne Genter of the Green Party. She has held this position since the 2023 general election. The electorate was abolished ahead of the 2026 general election.

== Population centres ==
The Rongotai electorate is centred on the southern and eastern suburbs of Wellington City. It stretches from Miramar in the east to take in the suburbs of Rongotai, Kilbirnie, Lyall Bay and Hataitai and runs from the south coast at Island Bay up through the southern section of the Brooklyn Hill to an east–west border next to Wellington Hospital in Newtown. Because Wellington Airport is within Rongotai's boundaries, the constituency also contains the Chatham Islands. It is named after the suburb of Rongotai which is roughly in its centre. Other suburbs include Berhampore, Ōwhiro Bay, Seatoun, and Roseneath.

A revision after 1996 pulled the boundary southwards, moving the suburbs around the Basin Reserve and the Massey University campus into the Wellington Central electorate. In the 2002 redistribution, the area covered by the Rongotai electorate did not change. Changes to boundaries were done in the 2007 redistribution, but no further changes were done in the 2013/14 or 2019/20 redistributions.

== History ==
Rongotai was one of the original 65 mixed-member proportional (MMP) representation electorates drawn in 1994 ahead of the 1996 election. It is the successor to the old Island Bay and Miramar electorates, though the areas in these seats in the orbit of the central city were incorporated into a redrawn Wellington Central electorate.

Labour's Annette King was elected and re-elected as the member of parliament for Rongotai at all seven elections from 1996 to 2014. In five out of the seven elections, Labour also won the party vote; the exception being in 1996 when National out-polled Labour by just 68 votes, and in 2014, when National's majority was 852 votes. Chris Finlayson of the National Party opposed King, his distant cousin, since the 2008 election. After the 2014 election, he told his supporters that on current trends, he should be able to win the electorate by 2038.

King announced in March 2017 that she was stepping down from her role as Labour's deputy leader and would retire from politics at the 2017 general election. The electorate of Rongotai was won in the election by Paul Eagle, retaining it for Labour.

During the 2020 general election, Eagle retained Rongotai for Labour based on preliminary results. Eagle announced in June 2022 that he would contest the 2022 Wellington City mayoral election and should he be successful, he would resign from Parliament and trigger a by-election.

The 2025 boundary review required a reduction in North Island electorates by one to reflect nationwide population shifts. The three Wellington City electorates (Rongotai, Wellington Central and Ōhāriu) were all underpopulated. All were abolished. The suburbs of Mount Cook and Brooklyn from Wellington Central were combined with the former Rongotai electorate and the new electorate was named Wellington Bays.

=== Members of Parliament ===
Unless otherwise stated, all MPs terms began and ended at general elections.

Key

Labour	ACT	United Future
Green	National

Election	Winner
1996 election	Annette King
1999 election	Annette King
2002 election	Annette King
2005 election	Annette King
2008 election	Annette King
2011 election	Annette King
2014 election	Annette King
2017 election	Paul Eagle
2020 election	Paul Eagle
2023 election	Julie Anne Genter
(Electorate abolished in 2026; see Wellington Bays)

=== List MPs ===
Members of Parliament elected from party lists in elections where that person also unsuccessfully contested the Rongotai electorate. Unless otherwise stated, all MPs terms began and ended at general elections.

Election	Winner
1999 election	Stephen Franks
2002 election	Gordon Copeland
2005 election	Gordon Copeland
2008 election	Chris Finlayson
2008 election	Russel Norman
2011 election	Chris Finlayson
2011 election	Russel Norman
2014 election	Chris Finlayson
2014 election	Russel Norman (Note: Norman resigned as a list MP effective 30 October 2015.)
2017 election	Chris Finlayson (Note: Finlayson resigned as a list MP effective 30 January 2019.)
2020 election	Nicole McKee
2023 election	Nicole McKee

== Election results ==
=== 2023 election ===
2023 general election results: Rongotai
Notes:	Blue background denotes the winner of the electorate vote. Pink background denotes a candidate elected from their party list. Yellow background denotes an electorate win by a list member, or other incumbent. A ✓ or ✗ denotes status of any incumbent, win or lose respectively.						
Party	Candidate	Votes	%	±%	Party votes	%	±%
Green	Julie Anne Genter	16,586	39.03	+24.23	13,664	32.06	+8.48
Labour	Fleur Fitzsimons	13,869	32.64	–24.65	13,361	31.35	–20.96
National	Karunā Muthu	8,794	20.70	+6.5	9,088	21.33	+8.16
ACT	Nicole McKee	1,179	2.77	+0.64	1,680	4.55	+0.62
NZ First	Geoff Mills	860	2.02	+0.98	1,411	2.21	+0.28
New Conservative	Bruce Welsh	275	0.64	–0.31	35	0.08	–0.43
Animal Justice	Atom Emet	216	0.5		85	0.20	
Independent	Don Newt McDonald	130	0.31	+0.07			
Vision New Zealand	Merania Roa	96	0.23				
Opportunities					1,792	5.32	+2.53
Te Pāti Māori					1,006	2.27	+1.83
Legalise Cannabis					153	0.36	+0.21
NZ Loyal					126	0.15	
NewZeal					67	0.02	
Freedoms NZ					61	0.01	+0.06
Women's Rights					46	0.01	
DemocracyNZ					21	0.01	
New Nation					13	0.003	
Leighton Baker Party					6	0.001	
Informal votes		488			206		
Total valid votes		42,493			42,821		
Turnout							
Green gain from Labour	Majority	2,717	6.39	+17.84			

=== 2020 election ===
2020 general election: Rongotai
Notes:	Blue background denotes the winner of the electorate vote. Pink background denotes a candidate elected from their party list. Yellow background denotes an electorate win by a list member, or other incumbent. A ✓ or ✗ denotes status of any incumbent, win or lose respectively.						
Party	Candidate	Votes	%	±%	Party votes	%	±%
Labour	✓ Paul Eagle	25,926	57.11	+5.39	23,878	52.31	+8.05
Green	Teall Crossen	6,719	14.80	−0.15	10,765	23.58	+5.82
National	David Patterson	6,447	14.20	−10.86	6,013	13.17	−14.84
Opportunities	Geoff Simmons	3,387	7.46	+3.37	1,272	2.79	−1.83
ACT	Nicole McKee	965	2.13	+1.86	1,795	3.93	+3.59
NZ First	Taylor Arneil	472	1.04	−1.04	883	1.93	−1.71
New Conservative	Bruce Welsh	431	0.95	+0.40	232	0.51	−0.37
Integrity	Troy Mihaka	162	0.36	—			
Independent	Don Newt McDonald	110	0.24	—			
Māori Party					201	0.44	−0.06
Advance NZ					184	0.40	—
Legalise Cannabis					70	0.15	−0.01
ONE					45	0.1	—
Sustainable NZ					27	0.06	—
Outdoors					21	0.04	+0.01
Vision NZ					21	0.04	—
Social Credit					10	0.02	+0.01
TEA					7	0.015	—
Heartland					7	0.015	—
Informal votes		779			259		
Total valid votes		45,398			45,649		
Turnout		45,649	?	?			
Labour hold	Majority	19,207	42.31	+15.65			

=== 2017 election ===
2017 general election: Rongotai
Notes:	Blue background denotes the winner of the electorate vote. Pink background denotes a candidate elected from their party list. Yellow background denotes an electorate win by a list member, or other incumbent. A ✓ or ✗ denotes status of any incumbent, win or lose respectively.						
Party	Candidate	Votes	%	±%	Party votes	%	±%
Labour	Paul Eagle	21,146	51.72	+2.29	18,323	44.26	+12.39
National	Chris Finlayson	10,246	25.06	+0.86	11,598	28.01	−6.17
Green	Teall Crossen	6,115	14.95	−5.66	7,353	17.76	−9.83
Opportunities	Paddy Plunket	1,676	4.09	—	1,915	4.62	—
NZ First	Geoffrey John Mills	851	2.08	±0.00	1,509	3.64	−2.07
Conservative	Bruce Welsh	225	0.55	−0.96	58	0.14	−1.56
ACT	Chris Sole	114	0.27	—	142	0.34	+0.01
Not A Party	Simon Smythe	31	0.07	—			
Māori Party					208	0.50	−0.14
Legalise Cannabis					70	0.16	−0.20
United Future					23	0.05	−0.33
Ban 1080					14	0.03	−0.02
Outdoors					14	0.03	—
Mana					12	0.02	−1.52 (Note: 2017 Mana Party swing is relative to the votes for Internet-Mana in 2014; it shared a party list with the Internet Party in the 2014 election)
Internet					8	0.01	−1.53 (Note: 2017 Internet Party swing is relative to the votes for Internet-Mana in 2014; it shared a party list with Mana Party in the 2014 election)
People's Party					8	0.01	—
Democrats					5	0.01	−0.01
Informal votes		480			140		
Total valid votes		40,884			41,400		
Turnout		41,746	85.41	+2.66			
Labour hold	Majority	10,900	26.66	+1.43			

=== 2014 election ===
2014 general election: Rongotai
Notes:	Blue background denotes the winner of the electorate vote. Pink background denotes a candidate elected from their party list. Yellow background denotes an electorate win by a list member, or other incumbent. A ✓ or ✗ denotes status of any incumbent, win or lose respectively.						
Party	Candidate	Votes	%	±%	Party votes	%	±%
Labour	✓ Annette King	18,840	49.43	−1.09	11,754	31.87	−2.31
National	Chris Finlayson	9,223	24.20	−1.18	12,606	34.18	+1.19
Green	Russel Norman	7,856	20.61	+0.43	10,176	27.59	+3.40
NZ First	Brent Pierson	793	2.08	+0.72	2,097	5.71	+1.26
Conservative	Bruce Welsh	576	1.51	+0.30	623	1.70	+0.59
Mana	Ariana Paretutanganui-Tamati	225	0.59	+0.59			
United Future	Sultan Eusoff	95	0.24	+0.24	143	0.38	−0.21
Independent	Don Richards	89	0.23	−0.19			
Climate	Aaron Carter	66	0.17	+0.17			
Patriotic Revolutionary Front	Johnny Overton	48	0.12	+0.12			
Internet Mana					568	1.54	+1.00 (Note: 2014 Internet Mana swing is relative to the votes for Mana in 2011; it shared a party list with Internet in the 2014 election.)
Māori Party					237	0.64	−0.04
Legalise Cannabis					131	0.36	−0.09
ACT					120	0.33	−0.32
Civilian					21	0.06	+0.06
Ban 1080					19	0.05	+0.05
Democrats					9	0.02	−0.01
Independent Coalition					7	0.02	+0.02
Focus					3	0.01	+0.01
Informal votes		304			217		
Total valid votes		38,115			38,731		
Turnout		38,731	82.75	+2.84			
Labour hold	Majority	9,617	25.23	+0.09			

Electorate (as at 30 April 2016): 48,525

=== 2011 election ===
2011 general election: Rongotai
Notes:	Blue background denotes the winner of the electorate vote. Pink background denotes a candidate elected from their party list. Yellow background denotes an electorate win by a list member, or other incumbent. A ✓ or ✗ denotes status of any incumbent, win or lose respectively.						
Party	Candidate	Votes	%	±%	Party votes	%	±%
Labour	✓ Annette King	18,179	50.52	−1.93	12,606	34.18	−8.51
National	Chris Finlayson	9,132	25.38	−2.95	12,168	32.99	+1.63
Green	Russel Norman	7,262	20.18	+4.34	8,920	24.19	+7.22
NZ First	Brent Pierson	488	1.36	+1.36	1,640	4.45	+1.93
Conservative	Bruce Welsh	435	1.21	+1.21	409	1.11	+1.11
ACT	Joel Latimer	168	0.47	−0.67	238	0.65	−1.34
Māori Party	Aroha Rickus	168	0.47	+0.47	251	0.68	−0.24
Independent	Don Richards	152	0.42	+0.42			
United Future					217	0.59	−0.27
Mana					198	0.54	+0.54
Legalise Cannabis					167	0.45	+0.04
Libertarianz					31	0.08	−0.01
Alliance					23	0.06	−0.03
Democrats					11	0.03	+0.02
Informal votes		617			302		
Total valid votes		35,984			36,879		
Labour hold	Majority	9,047	25.14	+1.02			

Electorate (as at 26 November 2011): 46,153

=== 2008 election ===
2008 general election: Rongotai
Notes:	Blue background denotes the winner of the electorate vote. Pink background denotes a candidate elected from their party list. Yellow background denotes an electorate win by a list member, or other incumbent. A ✓ or ✗ denotes status of any incumbent, win or lose respectively.						
Party	Candidate	Votes	%	±%	Party votes	%	±%
Labour	✓ Annette King	19,614	52.45		16,263	42.69	
National	Chris Finlayson	10,594	28.33		11,950	31.37	
Green	Russel Norman	5,925	15.84		6,464	16.97	
Kiwi	Gordon Copeland	515	1.38		169	0.44	
ACT	Michael Bridge	425	1.14		758	1.99	
United Future	Karuna Muthu	223	0.60		326	0.86	
Libertarianz	Mitch Lees	100	0.27		34	0.09	
NZ First					960	2.52	
Māori Party					351	0.92	
Progressive					291	0.76	
Bill and Ben					188	0.49	
Legalise Cannabis					158	0.41	
Family Party					53	0.14	
Pacific					48	0.13	
Alliance					37	0.10	
Workers Party					33	0.09	
RONZ					6	0.02	
Democrats					4	0.01	
RAM					4	0.01	
Informal votes		356			167		
Total valid votes		37,396			38,097		
Labour hold	Majority	9,020	21.12				

=== 2005 election ===
2005 general election: Rongotai
Notes:	Blue background denotes the winner of the electorate vote. Pink background denotes a candidate elected from their party list. Yellow background denotes an electorate win by a list member, or other incumbent. A ✓ or ✗ denotes status of any incumbent, win or lose respectively.						
Party	Candidate	Votes	%	±%	Party votes	%	±%
Labour	✓ Annette King	21,376	59.38	+3.23	18,327	49.96	
National	Nicola Young	8,738	24.27	+3.78	10,210	27.84	
Green	Luci Highfield	2,921	8.11		4,630	12.71	
United Future	Gordon Copeland	1,581	2.68		1,069	2.91	
Māori Party	Morris Te Whiti Love	499	1.39		232	0.63	
ACT	Gavin Middleton	425	1.18		379	1.03	
Progressive	Vladimir Bell	333	0.93		394	1.07	
Alliance	Jocelyn Brooks	127	0.35		31	0.08	
NZ First					1,109	3.02	
Destiny					107	0.29	
Legalise Cannabis					83	0.23	
Christian Heritage					39	0.11	
Libertarianz					20	0.05	
99 MP					18	0.05	
Family Rights					11	0.03	
Democrats					10	0.03	
One NZ					7	0.02	
RONZ					3	0.01	
Direct Democracy					1	0.00	
Informal votes		431			164		
Total valid votes		36,000			36,680		
Labour hold	Majority	12,638	35.11	−0.55			

=== 1999 election ===
Refer to Candidates in the New Zealand general election 1999 by electorate#Rongotai for a list of candidates.
