= Julie Anne Genter =

New Zealand politician

The Honourable Julie Anne Genter MP
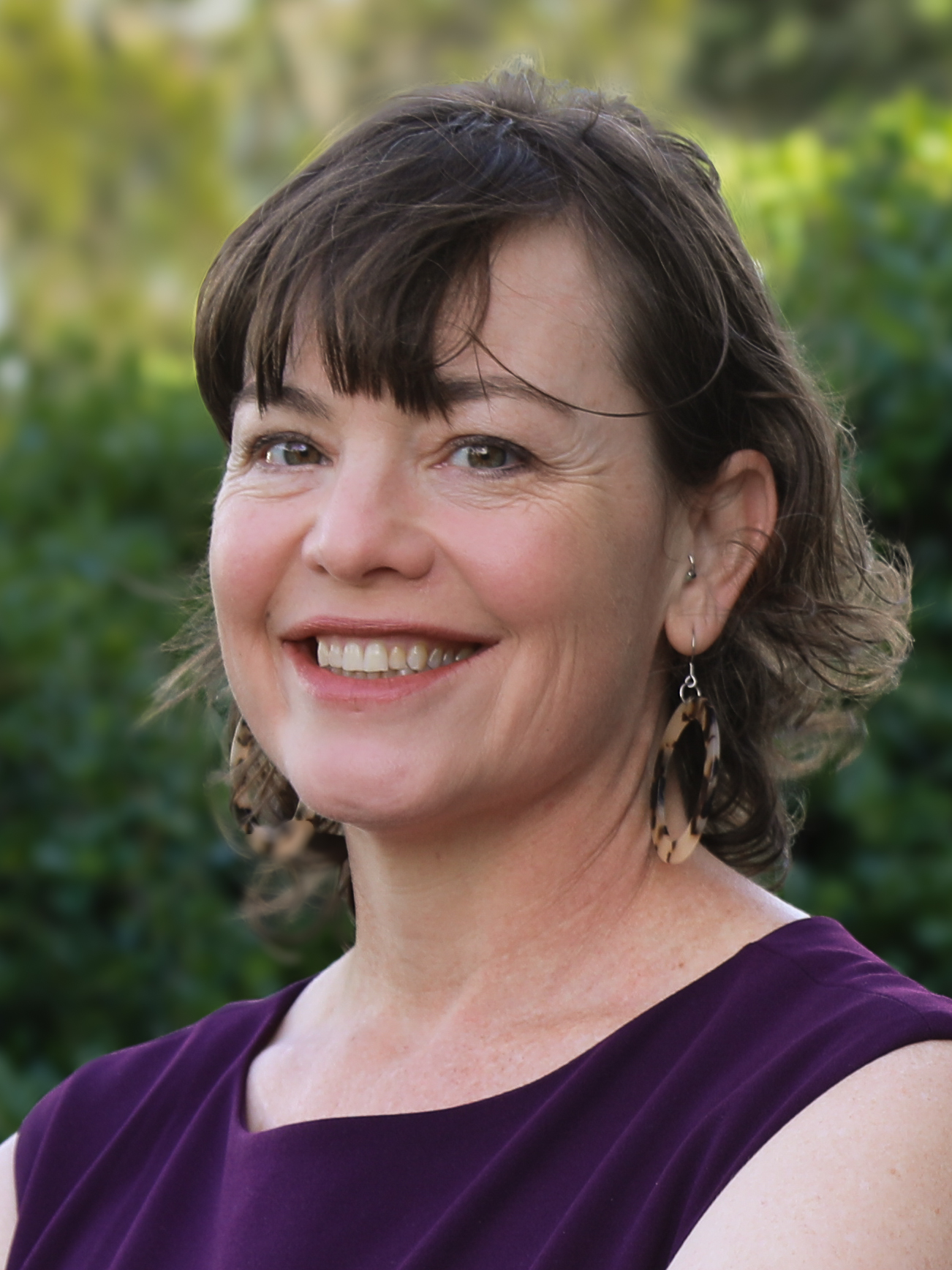
- Genter in February 2026

15th Minister for Women
- In office 26 October 2017 – 6 November 2020
- Prime Minister: Jacinda Ardern
- Preceded by: Paula Bennett
- Succeeded by: Jan Tinetti

Member of the New Zealand Parliament for Rongotai
- Incumbent
- Assumed office 14 October 2023
- Preceded by: Paul Eagle
- Majority: 2,717

Member of the New Zealand Parliament for Green party list
- In office 26 November 2011 – 14 October 2023

Personal details
- Born: 17 December 1979 (age 46) Rochester, Minnesota, U.S.
- Party: Green
- Domestic partner: Peter Nunns
- Children: 2
- Education: University of California, Berkeley; University of Auckland
- Website: Green Party profile

Julie Anne Genter MP (/ˈdʒɛntər/; born 17 December 1979) is a New Zealand politician. She has served as a Member of Parliament for the Green Party of Aotearoa New Zealand since 2011, first as a list member, and since 2023, for the Rongotai electorate. She served as the Minister for Women, Associate Minister for Health and Associate Minister for Transport during the first term of the Sixth Labour Government. She holds dual citizenship of New Zealand and the United States.

== Early life and education ==
Genter was born in Rochester, Minnesota, United States, in 1979, and grew up in Los Angeles, California. She gained a BA in philosophy from the University of California, Berkeley in 2003. She moved to France where in 2005 she obtained a post-graduate certificate in International Political Studies from the Institut d'études politiques in Paris. She gained a Masters of Planning Practice from the University of Auckland in 2008.

== Professional life ==
Genter has worked as a transportation planner since coming to New Zealand in 2006. She was first employed by Sinclair Knight Merz, then by MRCagney (formerly McCormick Rankin Cagney) from 2008.

She has advised numerous councils in Australasia on transportation, and appeared on TVNZ's Breakfast programme and Kim Hill's Saturday Morning programme on Radio New Zealand National.

== Member of Parliament ==
New Zealand Parliament
Years	Term	Electorate	List	Party
2011–2014	50th	List	13	Green
2014–2017	51st	List	8	Green
2017–2020	52nd	List	3	Green
2020–2023	53rd	List	4	Green
2023–2026	54th	Rongotai	4	Green
2026–present	54th	List	5	Green

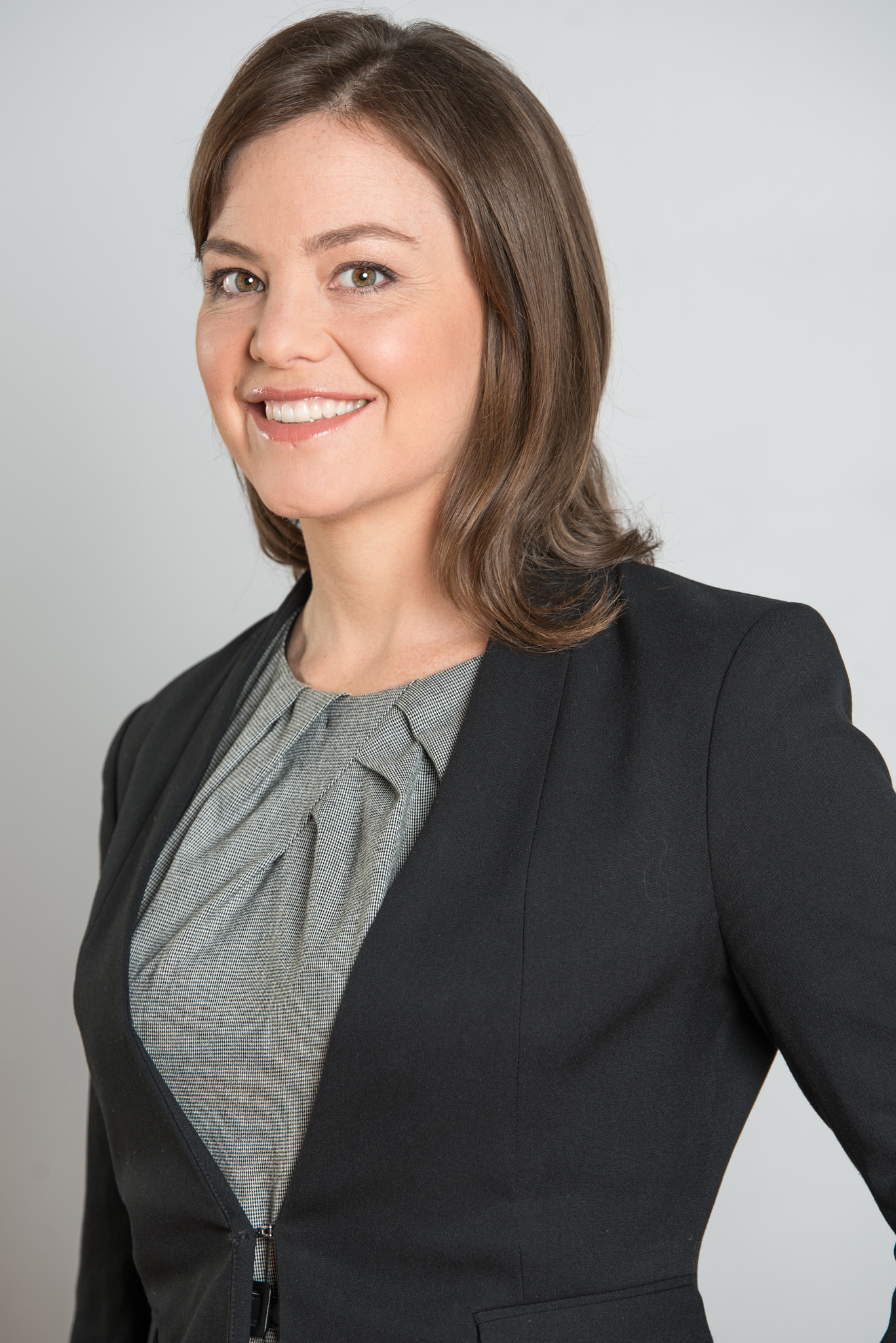
Genter in 2017

=== In opposition, 2011–2017 ===
Placed in 13th place on the Green Party list for the 2011 election, Genter entered Parliament, with the Greens gaining 14 List Members of Parliament.

In July 2015 Genter became the third ever female MP to hold a finance portfolio, alongside the Transport and Youth portfolios. The departure of long-standing Health Spokesperson Kevin Hague in September 2016 led to her taking on the Health portfolio, keeping Transport, Youth, Auckland Issues, and Associate Finance.

As an MP, Genter criticised the Fifth National government for spending billions of dollars on motorways, called for a nationwide mental health inquiry, and questioned Health Minister Jonathan Coleman on his use of a Coca-Cola funded study. In January 2017 Genter criticised former Green Party issues director Laila Harré, stating that the reason Harré gave for resigning from the Greens was not factual. Genter quickly apologised to Harré stating "regret any slight to your integrity".

In late 2016 Genter announced that she would be putting her name forward for the Green Party nomination for the Mount Albert by-election, which she gained in January. Genter came second in the February 2017 by-election after Jacinda Ardern.

Genter stated that she rebuffed an approach by Gareth Morgan to waka-jump to his The Opportunities Party (TOP) in July 2017, though TOP denied any "formal" approach had been made. At the 2017 election, Genter was re-elected to parliament on the Green Party list.

=== In Government, 2017–2023 ===
When the Labour Party and the Green Party formed a new government with New Zealand First, Genter was appointed Minister for Women and Associate Minister of both Health and Transport. Genter chose to take her oath to the Crown in Te Reo Māori along with other members, for which she was praised by political colleagues and members of the public.

In 2018 Genter added Civil Aviation to her portfolio as Associate Minister of Transport, after Transport Minister Phil Twyford was reported for making a phone call from an airplane preparing for departure.

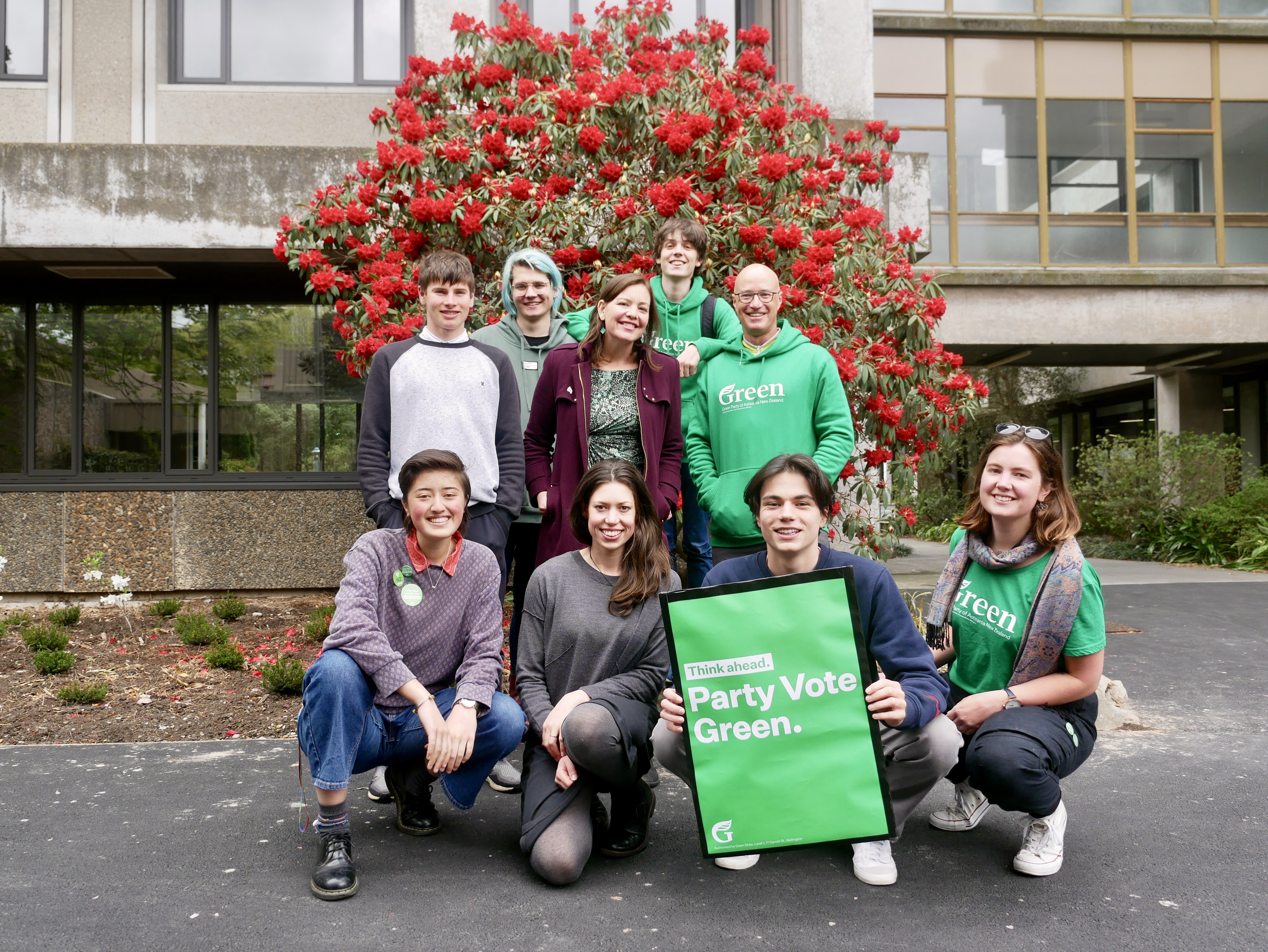
Genter with University of Canterbury Greens

Genter was re-elected to Parliament on the Green party list in the October 2020 New Zealand election, when the Greens earned 7.9% of the popular vote. Labour formed a majority government, and invited only the co-leaders of the Green Party to join Cabinet. Genter therefore stood down from her ministerial portfolios, but was granted retention of the title "The Honourable" for life in recognition of her term as a member of the Executive Council.

Genter was named Green Party spokesperson for Building and Construction, COVID-19 Response, Customs, Energy and Resources, Finance, Infrastructure, Local Government, State Owned Enterprises, Transport, and Urban Development.

=== In opposition, 2023–present ===
At the 2023 general election, Genter stood as a 'two-tick' candidate, seeking both the party vote and electorate vote. The campaign was successful, with the Rongotai electorate choosing a non-Labour representative for the first time ever. Genter received 2,717 more votes than Labour's candidate, Fleur Fitzsimons and almost twice as many votes as the third-placed National Party candidate.

On 29 November 2023, Genter assumed the Green Party's transport, infrastructure, urban development, building and construction, economic development, and state owned enterprises spokesperson portfolios.

On 1 May 2024 during a parliamentary debate on roading projects, Genter walked over to from her seat and yelled "Read the report!" at National MP and Minister Matt Doocey. Genter returned to her seat then rose and apologised. The Speaker later said he would refer Genter to Parliament's privileges committee. In the following days, two Wellington small business owners publicised their own complaints about arguments they had had with Genter over her advocacy of cycleways in the city, and a City Councillor alleged a similar incident from five years earlier. Genter apologised for her exchanges with the business owners.

On 1 August 2024, Genter was found in contempt of Parliament, censured and ordered to apologise after shouting at Doocey in May 2024. The Green Party described her actions as unacceptable and in breach of standards expected of MPs.

During the 2026 New Zealand general election, Genter was ranked fifth on the Green Party list. She contested the Wellington Bays electorate. Based on preliminary results, Genter came second place in Wellington Bays with 15,167 votes. She was unseated by Labour candidate Craig Renney by a narrow margin of 140 votes. She was re-elected to Parliament on the Green Party list.

== Personal life ==
On 18 February 2018, Genter announced that she was pregnant, having previously revealed that she had suffered a series of miscarriages. In August, Genter gave birth to a baby boy, announcing the news on her social media. She made international headlines after she and her partner cycled to Auckland Hospital for her labour to be induced.

In early 2019, Genter and her partner Peter Nunns moved to live in Wellington. In November 2021, she once again cycled to hospital to give birth to her second child, a daughter.

== Views and positions ==
=== Women ===
In her three years as Minister for Women, Genter worked to reduce the public-sector gender pay gap, and increased funding for primary maternity services.

=== Transport incentives and funding ===
Genter and the Green Party support a "feebate" scheme introduced by the Labour-led government to encourage a shift from petrol vehicles with high emissions of polluting material to electric and plug-in hybrid vehicles. When serving as Associate Minister of Transport in the previous term of government, Genter had been involved in the development of a similar policy which was blocked by New Zealand First. The scheme saw the sale of high-emitting vehicles being subject to a fee of up to $5,000 to fund rebates for electric and plug-in hybrid vehicles. Genter said on Twitter that the Ford Ranger was advertised as "all about lifestyle and status for men who want to feel more masculine," in the context of debate as to whether such vehicles were used for work purposes or as "a fashion choice for city dwellers." Genter later acknowledged that Ford Rangers are used for work by some, and said: "I was tweeting about how they are marketed, not a statement about everyone using one."

Genter negotiated for the Government to remove fringe benefit tax on employer payments for public transport, to match the tax exemption for work-provided carparks, and introduced subsidies for e-bikes.

Genter has been a strong supporter of better passenger rail between Auckland, Hamilton and Tauranga. As chair of the government's Infrastructure Committee, she promoted further investment in regional passenger rail services.

During the COVID-19 lockdown of 2020, Genter increased funding for tactical urbanism, enabling rapid expansion of cycle lanes and footpaths.

=== Transport safety ===
As Associate Minister for Transport, Genter introduced lower speed limits around all schools, supported by funding for signs and speed cameras.

=== Health ===
As Associate Minister for Health, Genter introduced government funding for spouses, partners and parents who care for a family member with disabilities.

=== Abortion ===
Genter voted in favour of legislation that decriminalises abortion.

=== Cannabis ===
Genter supports legalising while also regulating the use of cannabis.

Political offices
Preceded by Paula Bennett	Minister for Women; 2017–2020	Succeeded by Jan Tinetti
Preceded by Phil Twyford	Minister for Civil Aviation; 2018–2020	Succeeded by Michael Wood
