= Horowhenua (electorate) =

Horowhenua was a New Zealand parliamentary electorate, from 1978 to 1996.

== Population centres ==
The 1977 electoral redistribution was the most overtly political since the Representation Commission had been established through an amendment to the Representation Act in 1886, initiated by Muldoon's National Government. As part of the 1976 census, a large number of people failed to fill out an electoral re-registration card, and census staff had not been given the authority to insist on the card being completed. This had little practical effect for people on the general roll, but it transferred Māori to the general roll if the card was not handed in. Together with a northward shift of New Zealand's population, this resulted in five new electorates having to be created in the upper part of the North Island. The electoral redistribution was very disruptive, and 22 electorates were abolished, while 27 electorates were newly created (including Horowhenua) or re-established. These changes came into effect for the 1978 election.

In the 1977 electoral redistribution, the Kapiti electorate moved south and the Manawatu electorate moved north. The Horowhenua electorate was established in between those electorates, covering the Horowhenua District, with the main towns Waikanae, Ōtaki, Shannon, and Foxton. In the 1983 electoral redistribution, Horowhenua's boundaries contracted and Shannon was lost to the Manawatu electorate. In the 1987 electoral redistribution, the Horowhenua electorate moved slightly north, and Waikanae was lost to Kapiti, whilst Shannon was regained.

The Horowhenua electorate was abolished for the 1996 election, the first mixed-member proportional (MMP) representation election. It was largely replaced by the Ōtaki electorate.

== History ==
The electorate was established for the 1978 election. The first member was Geoff Thompson of the National Party, who was the representative for two parliamentary terms. Thompson was defeated by Labour's Annette King at the 1984 election. King represented the Horowhenua electorate for two parliamentary terms before she was defeated by National's Hamish Hancock in the 1990 election. Hancock in turn was succeeded by Labour's Judy Keall after one parliamentary term in the 1993 election. When the Horowhenua electorate was abolished in 1996, Keall stood in the Otaki electorate, where she had a majority of under 1,000 votes.

=== Members of Parliament ===
Unless otherwise stated, all MPs terms began and ended at general elections.

Key

National Labour

Election	Winner
1978 election	Geoff Thompson
1981 election	Geoff Thompson
1984 election	Annette King
1987 election	Annette King
1990 election	Hamish Hancock
1993 election	Judy Keall
(Electorate abolished in 1996; see Otaki)

== Election results ==
=== 1993 election ===
1993 general election: Horowhenua
Party	Candidate	Votes	%	±%
Labour	Judy Keall	8,387	41.84	
National	Hamish Hancock	6,040	30.13	−9.78
Alliance	Jill Bint	2,517	12.55	
NZ First	Pam Richardson	2,411	12.02	
Christian Heritage	Ron Hubbard	636	3.17	
Natural Law	Grant Wilson	54	0.26	
Majority		2,347	11.70	
Turnout		20,045	86.15	−1.03
Registered electors		23,267		

=== 1990 election ===
1990 general election: Horowhenua
Party	Candidate	Votes	%	±%
National	Hamish Hancock	9,727	39.91	
Labour	Annette King	9,103	37.35	−14.10
Green	Mike Smith	1,335	5.47	
NewLabour	Joe Pond	659	2.70	
Social Credit	M Pownall	256	1.05	
Democrats	Colin Whitmill	166	0.68	
Majority		624	2.56	
Turnout		21,246	87.18	−3.26
Registered electors		24,370		

=== 1987 election ===
1987 general election: Horowhenua
Party	Candidate	Votes	%	±%
Labour	Annette King	10,822	51.45	+6.45
National	Geoff Thompson	9,272	44.08	+1.02
Democrats	William Holden	940	4.46	+0.20
Majority		1,550	7.36	−5.43
Turnout		21,034	90.44	−3.07
Registered electors		23,257		

=== 1984 election ===
1984 general election: Horowhenua
Party	Candidate	Votes	%	±%
Labour	Annette King	10,401	45.00	
National	Geoff Thompson	9,954	43.06	−2.07
NZ Party	Graham Wiggins	1,772	7.66	
Social Credit	William Holden	985	4.26	
Majority		447	1.93	
Turnout		23,112	93.51	+2.94
Registered electors		24,715		

=== 1981 election ===
1981 general election: Horowhenua
Party	Candidate	Votes	%	±%
National	Geoff Thompson	9,825	45.13	+2.27
Labour	David Page	8,949	41.10	
Social Credit	Bobbie Smith	2,830	13.00	
Values	Barbara Hager	165	0.75	
Majority		876	4.02	−0.46
Turnout		21,769	90.57	+14.67
Registered electors		24,035		

=== 1978 election ===
1978 general election: Horowhenua
Party	Candidate	Votes	%	±%
National	Geoff Thompson	8,956	42.86	
Labour	Alan Charles Eyles	8,212	39.30	
Social Credit	Rachel Ann Blanchard	3,231	15.46	
Values	Rachel Moore	346	1.65	
Right to Life	Christopher John Bodley	150	0.71	
Majority		744	3.56	
Turnout		20,895	75.90	
Registered electors		27,529		
