= Hamish Hancock =

New Zealand politician

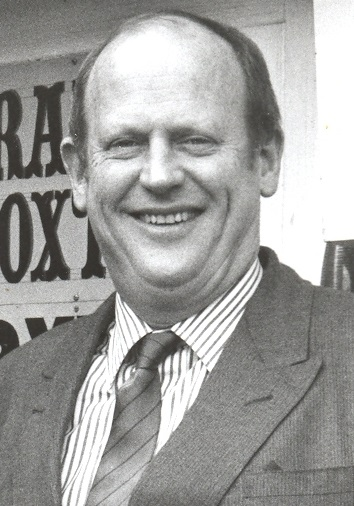
- Hancock in 1988

Member of the New Zealand Parliament for Horowhenua
- In office 1990–1993
- Preceded by: Annette King
- Succeeded by: Judy Keall

Personal details
- Born: 1947 (age 78–79) Wellington, New Zealand
- Party: National
- Profession: Lawyer

Hamish Hancock (born 1947) is a former National Party MP for Horowhenua and a lawyer.

== Education ==
Hancock attended Wellington College and Victoria University of Wellington, where he earned an LLM. He was active as a debater at University, earning a debating blue, and was awarded the Plunket Medal for debating in 1970. Hancock was a member of the New Zealand national debating team in that year.

== Legal career ==
Hancock practised as a solicitor for national law firm Rudd Watts and Stone, rising to a partnership.

== Parliamentary career ==
New Zealand Parliament
Years	Term	Electorate	Party
1990–1993	43rd	Horowhenua	National

Hancock was elected MP for the seat of Horowhenua, defeating sitting Labour MP Annette King by a small majority, after National's landslide win in 1990. He subsequently lost the seat to Labour MP Judy Keall in 1993.

== Later career ==
Hancock returned to practise as a solicitor, joining the Crown Law Office as Crown Counsel for public law. He has defended the Crown against numerous public law actions, primarily in the High Court, the Court of Appeal, and the Supreme Court.

Hancock is married to Shelley, and they have four sons.
