= Annette King =

New Zealand politician (born 1947)

The Honourable Dame Annette King DNZM
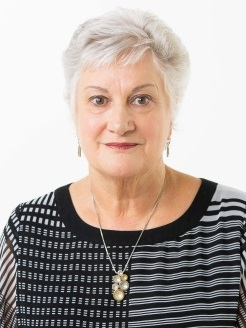
- King in 2019

19th High Commissioner of New Zealand to Australia
- In office 7 December 2018 – 22 December 2023
- Monarchs: Elizabeth II; Charles III
- Prime Minister: Jacinda Ardern; Chris Hipkins; Christopher Luxon
- Preceded by: Chris Seed
- Succeeded by: Eamonn O'Shaughnessy (acting)

14th Deputy Leader of the New Zealand Labour Party
- In office 24 November 2014 – 1 March 2017
- Leader: Andrew Little
- Preceded by: David Parker
- Succeeded by: Jacinda Ardern
- In office 11 November 2008 – 13 December 2011
- Leader: Phil Goff
- Preceded by: Michael Cullen
- Succeeded by: Grant Robertson

45th Minister of Justice
- In office 31 October 2007 – 19 November 2008
- Prime Minister: Helen Clark
- Preceded by: Mark Burton
- Succeeded by: Simon Power

23rd Minister of Transport
- In office 3 May 2006 – 19 November 2008
- Prime Minister: Helen Clark
- Preceded by: David Parker
- Succeeded by: Steven Joyce

34th Minister of Police
- In office 19 October 2005 – 19 November 2008
- Prime Minister: Helen Clark
- Preceded by: George Hawkins
- Succeeded by: Judith Collins

35th Minister of Health
- In office 10 December 1999 – 19 October 2005
- Prime Minister: Helen Clark
- Preceded by: Wyatt Creech
- Succeeded by: Pete Hodgson

44th Minister of Immigration
- In office 9 February 1990 – 2 November 1990
- Prime Minister: Geoffrey Palmer; Mike Moore
- Preceded by: Roger Douglas
- Succeeded by: Bill Birch

10th Minister of Employment
- In office 14 August 1989 – 2 November 1990
- Prime Minister: Geoffrey Palmer; Mike Moore
- Preceded by: Phil Goff
- Succeeded by: Maurice McTigue

Member of the New Zealand Parliament for Rongotai Miramar (1993–1996)
- In office 6 November 1993 – 23 September 2017
- Preceded by: Graeme Reeves
- Succeeded by: Paul Eagle

Member of the New Zealand Parliament for Horowhenua
- In office 14 July 1984 – 27 October 1990
- Preceded by: Geoffrey Thompson
- Succeeded by: Hamish Hancock

Personal details
- Born: Annette Faye Robinson; 13 September 1947 (age 79) Murchison, New Zealand
- Party: Labour
- Relations: Chris Finlayson (second cousin); Chester Borrows (third cousin)
- Occupation: Dental nurse; politician; diplomat

Dame Annette Faye King DNZM (née Robinson, born 13 September 1947) is a New Zealand former politician and diplomat. She served as Deputy Leader of the New Zealand Labour Party and Deputy Leader of the Opposition from 2008 to 2011, and from 2014 until 1 March 2017. She was a Cabinet Minister in the Fourth and Fifth Labour Governments, and was the MP for the Rongotai electorate in Wellington from 1996 to 2017.

== Early life ==
The daughter of Frank Pace Robinson and Olive Annie Robinson (née Russ), King was born in Murchison on 13 September 1947. After receiving primary education in Murchison, she attended Murchison District High School from 1960 to 1963, and then Waimea College in 1964. Between 1965 and 1967, she completed a diploma in school dental nursing, and worked as a dental nurse from 1967 to 1981. In 1981, she gained a bachelor's degree from the University of Waikato, and a postgraduate diploma in dental nursing the same year. She was a tutor of dental nursing in Wellington from 1982 to 1984. She is partly of Sri Lankan descent.

== Political career ==
New Zealand Parliament
Years	Term	Electorate	List	Party
1984–1987	41st	Horowhenua		Labour
1987–1990	42nd	Horowhenua		Labour
1993–1996	44th	Miramar		Labour
1996–1999	45th	Rongotai	6	Labour
1999–2002	46th	Rongotai	4	Labour
2002–2005	47th	Rongotai	7	Labour
2005–2008	48th	Rongotai	7	Labour
2008–2011	49th	Rongotai	4	Labour
2011–2014	50th	Rongotai	2	Labour
2014–2017	51st	Rongotai	4	Labour

King joined the Labour Party in 1972, and has held various offices within the party, including a term on the party's executive (1991–1992). In 1983 King unsuccessfully sought the Labour Party nomination for the seat of Tasman following the retirement of Labour leader Bill Rowling, but lost to Ken Shirley.

=== Member of Parliament ===
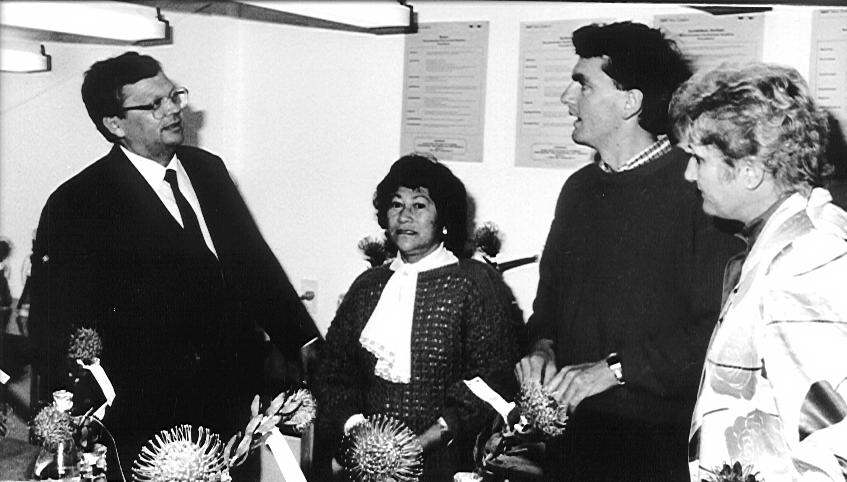
King (right) with David Lange (left) in 1986

In the 1984 election, she stood as the party's candidate for Horowhenua, and was successful. She was re-elected in the 1987 election. King was considered one of the most effective backbenchers in the Fourth Labour Government.

Following the 1987 election, she was appointed parliamentary under-secretary to the Minister of Employment and of Social Welfare. In August 1989 she put herself forward to fill one of two vacant seats in cabinet, winning a caucus ballot against ex-minister Richard Prebble. King was appointed Minister of Employment, Minister of Immigration, and Minister of Youth Affairs. She was also given special responsibility for liaising between Cabinet and the party caucus.

In the 1990 election, King lost the Horowhenua electorate against Hamish Hancock, a lawyer who stood for the National Party. She was chief executive officer of the Palmerston North Enterprise Board from 1991 until the 1993 election, when she was returned to Parliament as the MP for Miramar. In the 1996 election, when the shift to mixed-member proportional (MMP) representation prompted a reorganisation of electorates, King successfully contested the new seat of Rongotai. In that 1996 election, she was ranked in sixth place on the Labour Party's list.

After re-entering parliament new leader Helen Clark appointed her as spokesperson for Immigration and Business & Industry in December 1993. Less than a year later, in October 1994, after Peter Dunne split from Labour, Clark gave King Dunne's commerce and customs portfolios as well. In June 1995, after Clive Matthewson left Labour, King was given Matthewson's position of Shadow Minister of Social Welfare. In August 1997 King was promoted again, replacing Lianne Dalziel as Shadow Minister of Health while relinquishing the Social Welfare portfolio.

=== Cabinet Minister ===
When Labour won the 1999 election, and Helen Clark became Prime Minister, King was appointed Minister of Health. She was ranked sixth within Cabinet. After Labour winning a third term in government at the 2005 election, King took on the roles of Minister of Transport and Minister of Police. Following another reshuffle in late 2007, King became the new Minister of Justice. Before the 2008 general election she was elevated to number four on the party list.

=== Deputy Leader of the Opposition ===
Labour was defeated in the 2008 election by the National Party led by relative newcomer John Key. King retained her seat with a majority of about 7,800 votes. King was elected as the Deputy Leader of the Labour Party in a special caucus meeting on 11 November 2008, replacing Michael Cullen. Phil Goff, another senior Labour Party member, became the Leader of the Labour Party, replacing former Prime Minister Helen Clark. King stood again for Rongotai in the 2011 general election. She was ranked second on the Labour Party list. Following the defeat of the Labour Party in the 2011 election, Annette King announced she would step down as Deputy Leader of the Labour party, and Deputy Leader of the Opposition effective 13 December 2011. She was succeeded as Deputy Leader by Grant Robertson in the 2011 Labour Party leadership election.

In the 2014 election, King increased her majority in the Rongotai electorate, but National won the party vote for the first time since the initial MMP election in 1996. Labour's heavy defeat at the 2014 election caused the resignation of David Cunliffe as the party's leader and the next leadership election, with King in an interim capacity as deputy leader.

Following the election of Andrew Little as the new leader, King remained as deputy in a permanent capacity. Although Little guaranteed that she would be deputy for at least a year, he did not indicate whether he wanted her to be a future Deputy Prime Minister.

On 1 March 2017 King announced her intention to retire from politics at the 2017 election, despite initially indicating she would only contest the election on the party list. She also stepped down from the deputy leader role.

== High Commissioner ==
On 14 November 2018, King was appointed as High Commissioner to Australia by Foreign Affairs Minister Winston Peters.

== Honours and awards ==
King received both the New Zealand 1990 Commemoration Medal, and the New Zealand Suffrage Centennial Medal in 1993.

In 2007, King was awarded a Bravo award by the New Zealand Skeptics for her work along with "industry group Natural Products New Zealand, their attempt to provide standards and accountability via the Therapeutic Products and Medicines Bill."

In the 2018 New Year Honours, King was appointed a Dame Companion of the New Zealand Order of Merit, for services as a member of Parliament.

== Family ==
King is married with one daughter, and has three step-sons. She is a cousin of former National minister Chris Finlayson; King was a second cousin to Finlayson’s mother through her Russ side (the Russes were a large Nelson family also related to Chester Borrows. She received verbal abuse in Parliament from Finlayson in September 2013. Finlayson also opposed her in the Rongotai electorate at the 2008, 2011 and 2014 general elections.

In 2019 an authorized biography of King was published, co-written by John Harvey and Brent Edwards.

== Notes ==
New Zealand Parliament
Preceded by Geoffrey Thompson	Member of Parliament for Horowhenua; 1984–1990	Succeeded by Hamish Hancock
Preceded by Graeme Reeves	Member of Parliament for Miramar; 1993–1996	Constituency abolished
New constituency	Member of Parliament for Rongotai; 1996–2017	Succeeded by Paul Eagle
Political offices
Preceded by Phil Goff	Minister of Employment; 1989–1990	Succeeded by Maurice McTigue
Preceded by Wyatt Creech	Minister of Health; 1999–2005	Succeeded by Pete Hodgson
Preceded by George Hawkins	Minister of Police; 2005–2008	Succeeded by Judith Collins
Preceded by Mark Burton	Minister of Justice; 2007–2008	Succeeded by Simon Power
Preceded by Bill English	Deputy Leader of the Opposition; 2008–2011 2014–2017	Succeeded by Grant Robertson
Preceded by David Parker	Deputy Leader of the Opposition; 2008–2011 2014–2017	Succeeded by Jacinda Ardern
Party political offices
Preceded by Michael Cullen	Deputy Leader of the Labour Party; 2008–2011 2014–2017	Succeeded by Grant Robertson
Preceded by David Parker	Deputy Leader of the Labour Party; 2008–2011 2014–2017	Succeeded by Jacinda Ardern
Diplomatic posts
Preceded by Chris Seed	High Commissioner to Australia; 2018–present	Incumbent
