= Fleur Fitzsimons =

Former Wellington City councillor

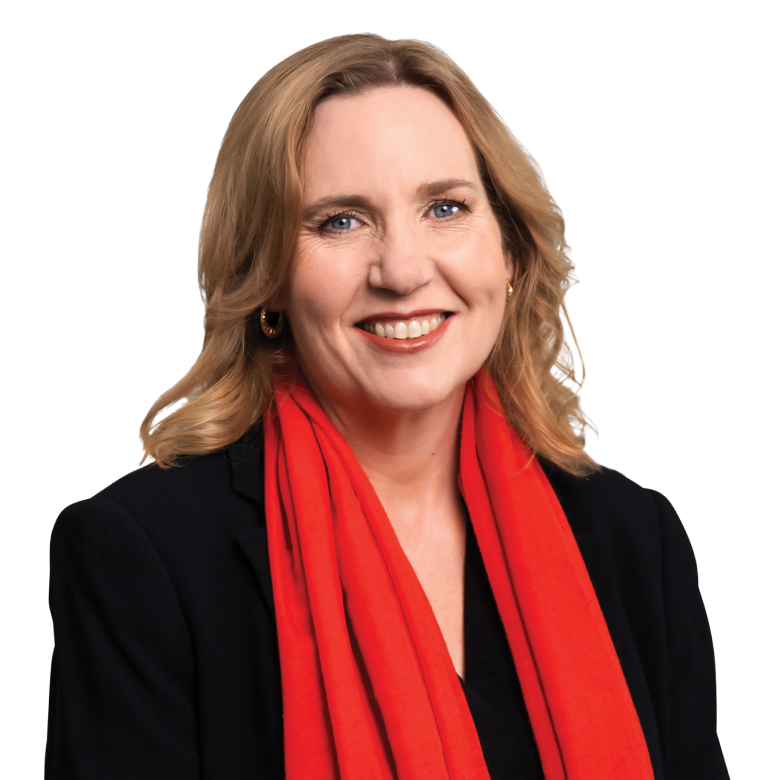
- Fitzsimons in 2023

National Secretary of the Public Service Association
- Incumbent
- Assumed office February 2025 Serving with Duane Leo
- Preceded by: Kerry Davies

Wellington City Councillor for Southern Ward
- In office 22 December 2017 – 8 October 2022 Serving with David Lee (2017–2019); Laurie Foon (2019–2022)
- Preceded by: Paul Eagle
- Succeeded by: Nureddin Abdurahman

Personal details
- Party: Labour
- Children: 4
- Education: Victoria University of Wellington
- Profession: Lawyer

Fleur Ann Fitzsimons is a New Zealand local politician, lawyer, and unionist. A member of the Labour Party, she was a member of Wellington City Council from 2017 to 2022. In 2025 she was appointed a national secretary of the Public Service Association.

== Early life ==
Fitzsimons grew up in Hastings. She studied law at Victoria University of Wellington and whilst there was President of the Victoria University of Wellington Students' Association from 2002 to 2003. From 2003 to 2005 she was co-president of the New Zealand Union of Students' Associations, serving alongside future Labour Party general secretary Andrew Kirton. She then worked as a lawyer for the Public Service Association from 2008 to 2017 and was a member of the Island Bay School Board of Trustees.

== Political career ==
=== Wellington City Council ===
When Paul Eagle resigned his seat on the Wellington City Council after his election to Parliament a by-election was held in his ward. Fitzsimons replaced him as the Labour Party candidate, who received Eagle's endorsement, and won the by-election. Re-elected in 2019, she was a contender for the role of deputy mayor, but the role ultimately went to Sarah Free. During her second term on the council she was seen as the de-facto leader of the centre-left group of councillors during the contentious triennium led by the then-mayor Andy Foster. She was also the Labour Party's women's vice president. She declined to run again at the 2022 election, by which time she was speculated as intending to run for parliament and would not rule it out.

=== 2023 campaign for Parliament ===
After Eagle's unsuccessful campaign for the Wellington mayoralty, he announced on 13 December 2022 that he would not be contesting the 2023 general election. In March 2023, Fitzsimons was selected unopposed as Labour's candidate for Rongotai to replace Eagle. At the election, Fitzsimons came second in Rongotai, 2,717 votes or 6.39 percentage points behind Julie Anne Genter of the Green Party.

== Union leadership ==
Following her retirement from Wellington City Council, Fitzsimons returned to work with the PSA and was appointed an associate national secretary. She continued in that role following her Rongotai electoral defeat. In January 2024, she criticised the National-led coalition government's planned public sector cuts as "very short-sighted" and claimed many agencies were already running "on the smell of an oily rag" due to austerity measures imposed by the previous Labour administration. In February 2025 it was announced Fitzimons would be a national secretary of the union.

== Personal life ==
Fitzsimons has four children, one of whom is transgender. She lives in Island Bay.

Political offices
Preceded by Paul Eagle	Wellington City Councillor for Southern Ward; 2017–2022; Served alongside: David Lee (2017–2019) & Laurie Foon (2019–2022)	Succeeded by Nureddin Abdurahman
