= Geoff Thompson (politician) =

New Zealand politician (1940–2026)

Geoff Thompson CNZM

Member of the New Zealand Parliament for Horowhenua
- In office 25 November 1978 – 1984
- Preceded by: New constituency
- Succeeded by: Annette King

13th President of the National Party
- In office 1994–1998
- Preceded by: Lindsay Tisch
- Succeeded by: John Slater

Personal details
- Born: Geoffrey William Fleetwood Thompson; 11 June 1940 Wellington, New Zealand
- Died: 19 October 2026 (aged 86) Waikanae, New Zealand
- Party: National
- Profession: Barrister and solicitor

Geoffrey William Fleetwood Thompson CNZM (11 June 1940 – 19 October 2026) was a New Zealand politician of the National Party.

== Early life ==
Thompson was born in Wellington on 11 June 1940. He received his education at Waterloo and Silverstream primary schools, Hutt Valley High School, Horowhenua College and Wellington College. He attended Victoria University of Wellington and graduated LL.M. in 1966.

== Member of parliament ==
New Zealand Parliament
Years	Term	Electorate	Party
1978–1981	39th	Horowhenua	National
1981–1984	40th	Horowhenua	National

Thompson represented the Horowhenua electorate in the New Zealand House of Representatives from 1978 to 1984. He was a parliamentary under-secretary between 1981 and 1984.

== After parliament ==
Thompson was awarded the New Zealand 1990 Commemoration Medal for services to New Zealand. He was a lawyer on the Kāpiti Coast.

He served as the National Party president from 1994 to 1998. In the 1999 New Year Honours, he was appointed a Companion of the New Zealand Order of Merit, for services to politics.

== Death ==
Thompson died at Waikanae on 19 October 2026, at the age of 86.

== Notes ==
New Zealand Parliament
New constituency	Member of Parliament for Horowhenua; 1978–1984	Succeeded by Annette King
Party political offices
Preceded by Lindsay Tisch	President of the National Party; 1994–1998	Succeeded by John Slater
