= Justin Lester (politician) =

Former Mayor of Wellington

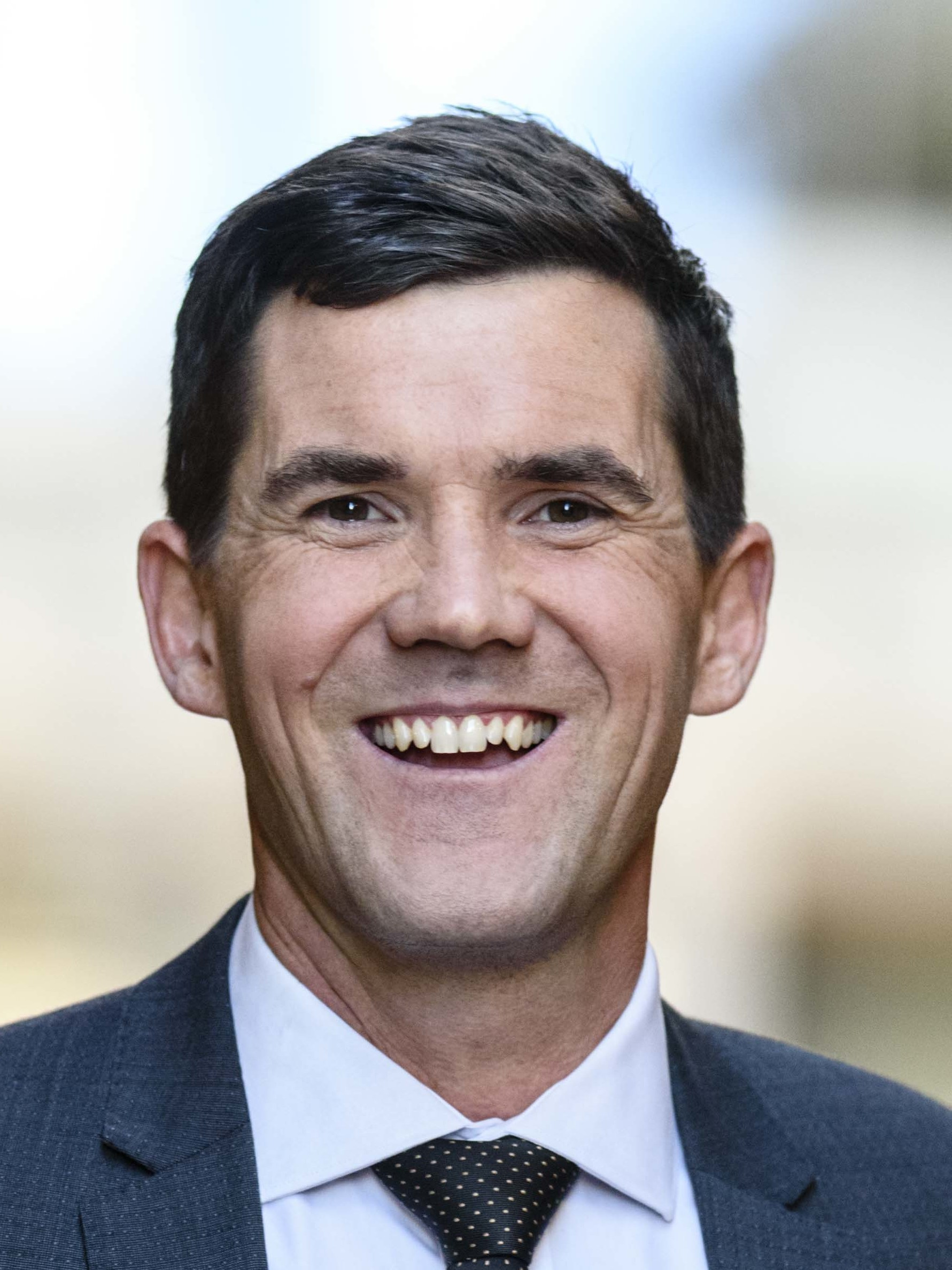

35th Mayor of Wellington
- In office 26 October 2016 – 19 October 2019
- Deputy: Paul Eagle (2016–2017); Jill Day (2017–2019)
- Preceded by: Celia Wade-Brown
- Succeeded by: Andy Foster

23rd Deputy Mayor of Wellington
- In office 2013–2016
- Preceded by: Ian McKinnon
- Succeeded by: Paul Eagle

Wellington City Councillor (Northern Ward)
- In office 2010–2016 Serving with Helene Ritchie & Malcolm Sparrow
- Succeeded by: Jill Day, Peter Gilberd, Malcolm Sparrow

Personal details
- Born: 23 December 1978 (age 47) Blenheim, New Zealand
- Party: Labour
- Spouse: Elizabeth
- Children: 2
- Education: University of Otago; Heidelberg University

Justin Mark Lester (born 23 December 1978) is a New Zealand businessman and politician. He was Mayor of Wellington between 2016 and 2019, following six years on the Wellington City Council.

== Early life and career ==
Lester was born in Blenheim, but raised in South Invercargill from 1980 mainly with his mother and his older & younger siblings in a state house. His parents were separated and when he was 11 years old his father committed suicide. His family were on welfare and had to apply to get the money to travel to Nelson to attend the funeral. When he was 19 he won a scholarship to live in Germany as part of a high school exchange programme. Lester has an LLB and BA (German) from the University of Otago and a Master of Laws (LLM) from the University of Heidelberg in Germany.

Before entering local politics, Lester worked in property and asset management, and in commercial real estate. He co-founded the salad bar chain Kapai in 2005.

== Political career ==
Lester stood for the Wellington City Council in the 2010 local elections and was elected for the Northern ward. A first-time candidate, Lester received the most votes of the seven candidates for that ward and defeated incumbent Hayley Wain. He was appointed by mayor Celia Wade-Brown to lead the council's community facilities portfolio.

Lester was re-elected in the 2013 local elections. Wade-Brown was re-elected mayor and chose Lester to succeed Ian McKinnon as deputy mayor. Lester also chaired the council's Governance, Finance and Planning Committee and the Performance Review Committee.

In December 2015, Lester announced he was running to be Mayor of Wellington on a Labour Party ticket with Paul Eagle in the October 2016 local government elections. He ran on a platform of completing Wellington projects such as the film museum, airport runway extension and a convention centre. Wade-Brown had initially said she would seek a third term, but ultimately stepped down and gave Lester her endorsement. He was elected over former Porirua Mayor Nick Leggett and fellow city councillors Jo Coughlan and Andy Foster.

As mayor, Lester appointed Eagle as deputy mayor and former journalist Joseph Romanos as his chief advisor, among other former Labour Party employees from Parliament. Lester chose to lead the council's arts portfolio. When Eagle resigned to become a member of Parliament in 2017, Lester appointed first-term councillor Jill Day as the new deputy mayor.

Lester announced he would run for a second term in the 2019 local government elections. In a surprise result, he lost his bid for re-election to challenger Andy Foster by 62 votes, becoming the first incumbent Wellington mayor in 33 years to lose re-election after just one term in office. Lester applied for a manual judicial recount, but was denied.

=== Positions and views ===
Lester has supported the Wellington City Council's support of the Living Wage campaign. He has criticised the Wellington Chamber of Commerce for signalling that it will take legal action against the Council for extending the living wage to security guards.

At his mayoral campaign launch in April 2016, he announced further policies and said he would: give first-home builders a $5000 rates rebate, introduce free entry for children under five at council pools, remove the fees businesses pay to have outdoor dining on public land, and address the council's "ingrained sexism" by employing more women in senior roles.

During his campaign for the mayoralty, Lester promised to significantly boost arts investment. In March 2017, following economic data that showed Wellington was New Zealand's "most creative city", Lester confirmed a $500,000 funding boost to events, access to venues and public art in a bid to keep Wellington's culture scene competitive with Auckland.

As mayor, Lester announced in February 2017 he was looking to trim council spending by $8 million to help pay for his various election promises which included strengthening the city's town hall, developing a new movie museum and convention centre, establishing an emergency reservoir at Prince of Wales park, ensuring a living wage for council employees and directing money to new infrastructure projects to help ease congestion around Wellington's Basin Reserve. Later that month, Lester announced with Deputy Mayor Paul Eagle that the council would build 750 new social housing units and affordable homes in an effort to avoid a "housing crisis". He also committed Wellington to be a bilingual (English and Māori) city by 2040. Wellington Central Library was closed indefinitely in March 2019 due to earthquake risk fears. Lester stated the council had no legal obligation to close the library but that it was "morally obliged" to do so.

In his 2019 mayoral campaign, Lester pledged to end homelessness and remove private vehicles from the central city.

== Career after politics ==
After losing the mayoralty Lester took up positions as government director at Dot Loves Data and savings ambassador for Simplicity, a KiwiSaver planning organisation.

== Personal life ==
Lester lives in Johnsonville with his wife Elizabeth and two daughters. In January 2017 Lester was involved in a serious car crash driving from Mākara with his chief of staff, Joseph Romanos. All passengers walked away unhurt, after a truck crossed the centre line. The electric Wellington City Council vehicle they were travelling in was damaged beyond repair.

Political offices
Preceded by Celia Wade-Brown	Mayor of Wellington; 2016–2019	Succeeded by Andy Foster
Preceded by Ian McKinnon	Deputy Mayor of Wellington; 2013–2016	Succeeded by Paul Eagle
