= 2019 Wellington mayoral election =

New Zealand local election

- 12 October 2019
- Turnout: 59,461 (40.12%)
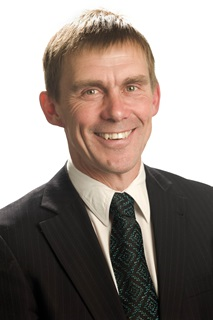

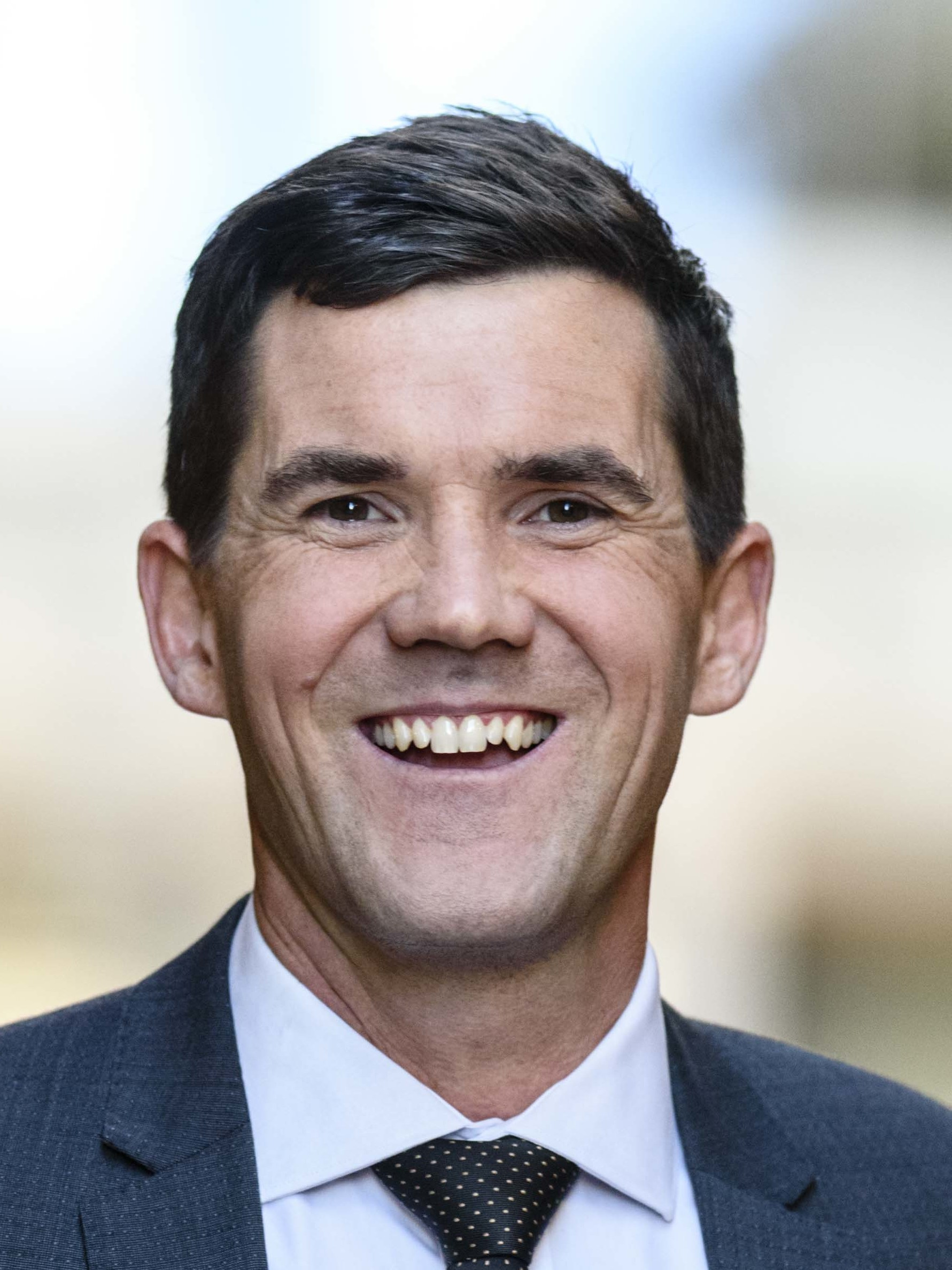

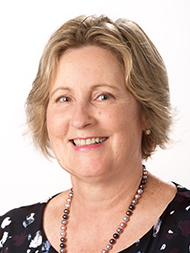
Candidate	Andy Foster	Justin Lester	Diane Calvert
Party	Independent	Labour	Independent
Primary vote	19,323	20,830	8,385
Percentage	31.9%	34.4%	13.8%
Final count	27,364	27,302
Percentage	50.02%	49.98%
Mayor before election
Justin Lester
Elected mayor
Andy Foster

The 2019 Wellington mayoral election was part of the New Zealand local elections and was held on 12 October to determine who would serve as Mayor of Wellington for the next three-year term. It was won by Andy Foster, who unseated the incumbent Justin Lester by 62 votes.

== Key dates ==
Key dates for the election were:

- 1 July: Electoral Commission enrolment campaign began.
- 19 July: Nominations opened for candidates. Rolls opened for inspection.
- 16 August: Nominations closed at 12 noon. Rolls closed.
- 21 August: Election date and candidates' names announced.
- 20 to 25 September: Voting documents delivered to households. Electors could post the documents back to electoral officers as soon as they have voted.
- 12 October: Polling day. Voting documents had to be at council before voting closes at 12 noon. Preliminary results were to be available as soon as all ordinary votes are counted.
- 17 to 23 October: Official results, including all valid ordinary and special votes, declared.

== Candidates ==
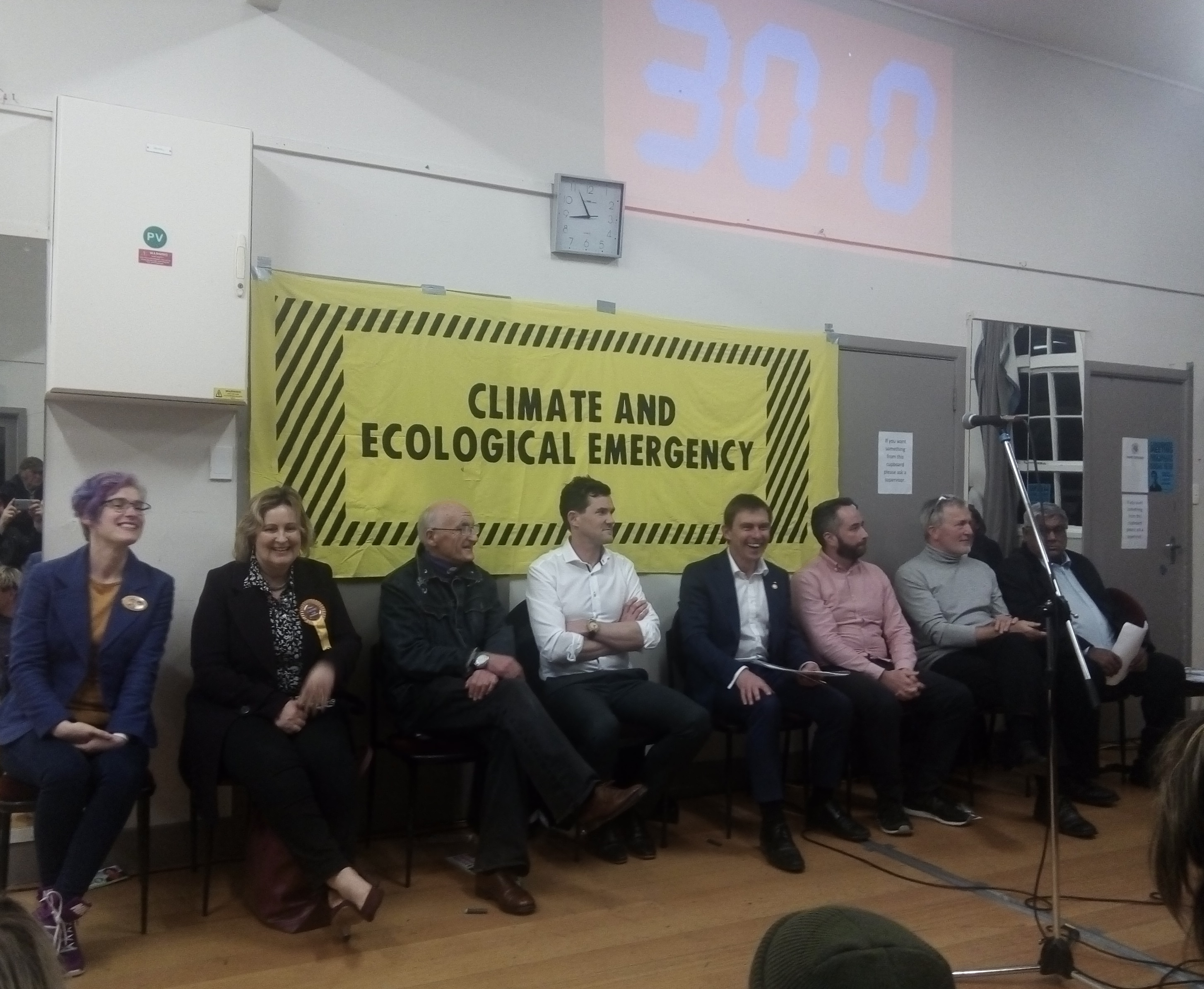
Candidates at a debate L. to R.: Condie, Calvert, Cox, Lester, Foster, Hill, Hausberg, Rathod

A total of nine candidates sought the mayoralty position in 2019.

Name	Photo	Affiliation	Description	Endorsements
Diane Calvert		Your Advocate	Wellington City Councillor for Wharangi/Onslow-Western Ward Diane Calvert announced her candidacy for the Wellington City Council mayoralty on 13 August 2019.	The Wellington Party, a centre-right election ticket; Simon Woolf, city councillor for the Onslow-Western ward
Jenny Condie		YIMBY Futureproof Wellington	Former Opportunities Party parliamentary candidate Jenny Condie confirmed her candidacy on 8 August 2019. She described herself as a moderate and supported the council increasing borrowing to pay for infrastructure while limiting any "spending spree on non-essential items".	
Andrew Cox		aaacnp	Nomination lodged on 16 August. He aimed to "make a significant contribution to dramatically cutting CO_{2} emissions".	
Andy Foster		Andy for Wellington	Veteran councillor and 2017 New Zealand First parliamentary candidate Andy Foster announced he would be running for mayor for a third time.	Sir Peter Jackson, film director
Conor Hill		For a Better Wellington	Blogger Conor Hill entered the mayoral race on 10 July 2019. Hill previously worked in project management, IT, as a farmhand and volunteered for the Labour Party. He resigned his Labour membership to enable himself to stand against Lester, in accordance with the party's constitution.	
Norbert Hausberg		Independent	Former puppet theatre operator Norbert Hausberg was the first candidate to officially enter the race. He previously stood for the regional council in 2016 on a platform of reducing transport fares and carbon emissions, but was unsuccessful. In 2019 he pledged to, if elected, move towards making Wellington carbon neutral by 2022.	
Justin Lester		Labour	Incumbent mayor Justin Lester of the Labour Party announced he would run for a second term in 2019. The Labour Party also fielded candidates to contest every ward, the first time they have done so since 1986.	Celia Wade-Brown, former mayor; Unions Wellington, local trade union
Don Newt McDonald		Plain Talk – Growth Is Bad 4 WGT Mayor	Perennial and "anti-growth" candidate.	
Ajay Rathod		Independent	Local businessman. Lodged nomination on 15 August.	

== Campaign ==
Local promoter Phil Sprey offered funding of $10,000 to the campaign for a viable candidate to run against Lester, stating Lester was "killing Wellington", but he was not interested in running himself. Lester responded by saying Sprey was "all talk". Former councillor Bryan Weyburne and local businessman Digby Paape accepted Sprey's offer and formed the Wellington First Party which would focus on transportation issues and was critical of the amounts of ratepayer money spent on cycle ways. Ultimately, Paape did not run for mayor.

Incumbent Mayor Justin Lester launched his re-election campaign in March at the Te Wharewaka function centre to a crowd of supporters and Labour Party faithful. He announced a series of promises for his second term including removing private vehicle access to Wellington City's golden mile which encompasses Lambton Quay, Willis Street and Courtenay Place. Other policies proposed by Lester included ending homelessness by increasing supported living units and establishing a 'Welcome Home' package for refugees which would grant new arrivals to the city free access to council facilities.

On 12 July 2019 the formation of a new centre-right political grouping 'The Wellington Party' was announced. The new party fielded candidates for both the Wellington City Council and Wellington Regional Council with policies around expenditure cuts, improvement to the bus network and reduction of cycleway construction. The Wellington Party claimed to have polling data showing low approval ratings for both Lester and his grasp on the city's issues. Lester said he welcomed the new party stating it was good for democracy to have an open exchange of ideas. The party was created by members of the National Party; National's Wellington Central chair Bryan Hall became chairman of the new party, but has no official ties. It also subsumed the previously proposed Wellington First party.

Near the end of July, Conor Hill called for council-owned golf courses to be reduced in size to free-up land for housing in an attempt to mitigate the housing crisis. Lester and other Labour Party representatives voiced opposition to the proposals, saying the city's green town belt needed protecting. Hill launched a series of policies including a switch to land value-based rates, establishing light rail and cancelling council funding for airport runway extensions and convention centres.

August saw a series of late entries to the mayoral race and increasing criticism from councilors of the direction of the city under Lester's leadership. Diane Calvert, on announcing her bid for the mayoralty, said that "The city just hasn't moved forward [under Lester]. No one likes to say that about their city ... but I think its got to the stage now where we've got to be open and transparent about things." The Wellington Party withdrew its plans to stand a mayoral candidate for fear of splitting the centre-right vote, and instead encouraged supporters to vote for Calvert. Andy Foster, a councilor since 1992, made his bid for the mayoralty later than most with the support of director Peter Jackson, who was opposed to the proposed development at Shelly Bay which included plans for new housing and retail space. Jackson stated he believed Lester lacked integrity.

In September candidates' hoardings began to appear around the city. In an interview with the Dominion Post, three former mayors voiced their concern around the trajectory of Wellington. Lester's immediate predecessor, Celia Wade-Brown (mayor from 2010 to 2016), said she supported Lester continuing in the role. Mark Blumsky (1995–2001) defended his sale of the council asset Capital Power while he was mayor, and suggested that the council look at asset sales now as an alternative method of acquiring revenue to reinvest in Civic Square. Wade-Brown, Blumsky and Kerry Prendergast (2001–2010) identified a poor transport system, uncertainty around infrastructure projects and traffic as the primary issues hurting Wellington's reputation. Also in September, the Wellington branch of the New Zealand Council of Trade Unions released endorsements concerning races throughout the Wellington region. Candidates who were, in the opinion of Unions Wellington, deemed to be "strong, progressive candidates who put working people first" received an endorsement. Justin Lester, Conor Hill and Norbert Hausberg were all recommended as potential 'progressive' mayors while it was urged that Jenny Condie and Andy Foster be ranked last by voters.

== Turnout ==
The election's final turnout was 41.2% of eligible voters voted in this election. This is lower than the previous election in 2016, which saw 45.6% turnout, but similar to the 2013 and 2010 elections.

== Results ==
In a result that shocked many, Andy Foster beat incumbent Justin Lester on the final iteration by 62 votes, after votes for Calvert were transferred to Foster. This was thought to be the closest result in a Wellington mayoral election.

A preliminary count gave Foster a lead of 715 on the final iteration. After the final results were announced and the margin reduced, Lester indicated he was might request a recount, which he did on 25 October 2019, but this request was denied by a court on 8 November 2019.

2019 Wellington City mayoral election (final results)
Party	Candidate	FPv%	Count							
Party	Candidate	FPv%	1	2	3	4	5	6	7	8
Andy for Wellington	Andy Foster	31.9	19,323	19,345	19,411	19,493	19,567	20,457	22,062	27,364
Labour	Justin Lester	34.4	20,830	20,845	20,904	20,965	21,084	22,446	24,620	27,302
Your Advocate	Diane Calvert	13.8	8,385	8,405	8,429	8,493	8,584	9,335	11,471	
YIMBY Futureproof Wellington	Jenny Condie	9.7	5,901	5,925	5,957	6,005	6,143	7,227		
For a Better Wellington	Conor Hill	7.5	4,555	4,566	4,612	4,658	4,796			
Independent	Norbert Hausberg	0.9	562	576	592	632				
Independent	Ajay Rathod	0.6	399	406	426					
Plain Talk – Growth Is Bad 4 WGT Mayor	Don McDonald	0.5	329	340						
Independent	Andrew Cox	0.2	151							
Electorate: Valid: 60,435 Quota: Turnout: 40.12%

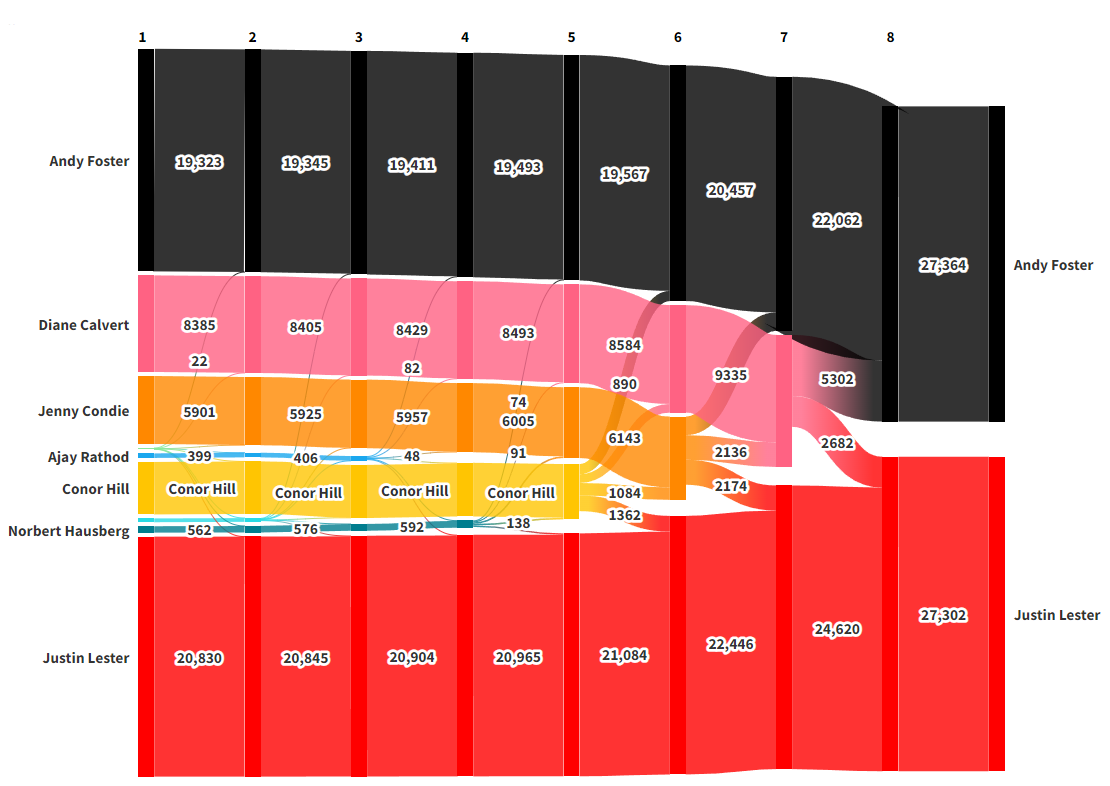
2019 Wellington City mayoral election (final results).png

Unsuccessful mayoral candidates Jenny Condie and Diane Calvert were both elected to Wellington City Council. Lester's Labour ticket also faced setbacks in other Wellington local elections, with Brian Dawson losing his seat to student union president Tamatha Paul in the Lambton ward and Peter Gilberd losing his seat to Jenny Condie in the Northern ward.

As mayor, Andy Foster also won the right to select the deputy mayor from the Wellington City councillors. A number of councillors approached Foster to push against selecting Nicola Young or Diane Calvert as deputy; the elected council was mainly left-leaning with three Labour members, three Green members, and two other left-leaning members, whereas Foster, Young, and Calvert are more conservative. Foster selected Green Party member Sarah Free as the deputy mayor.

== See also ==
- 2019 Wellington City Council election
