= Anna Fifield =

New Zealand journalist (born 1976)

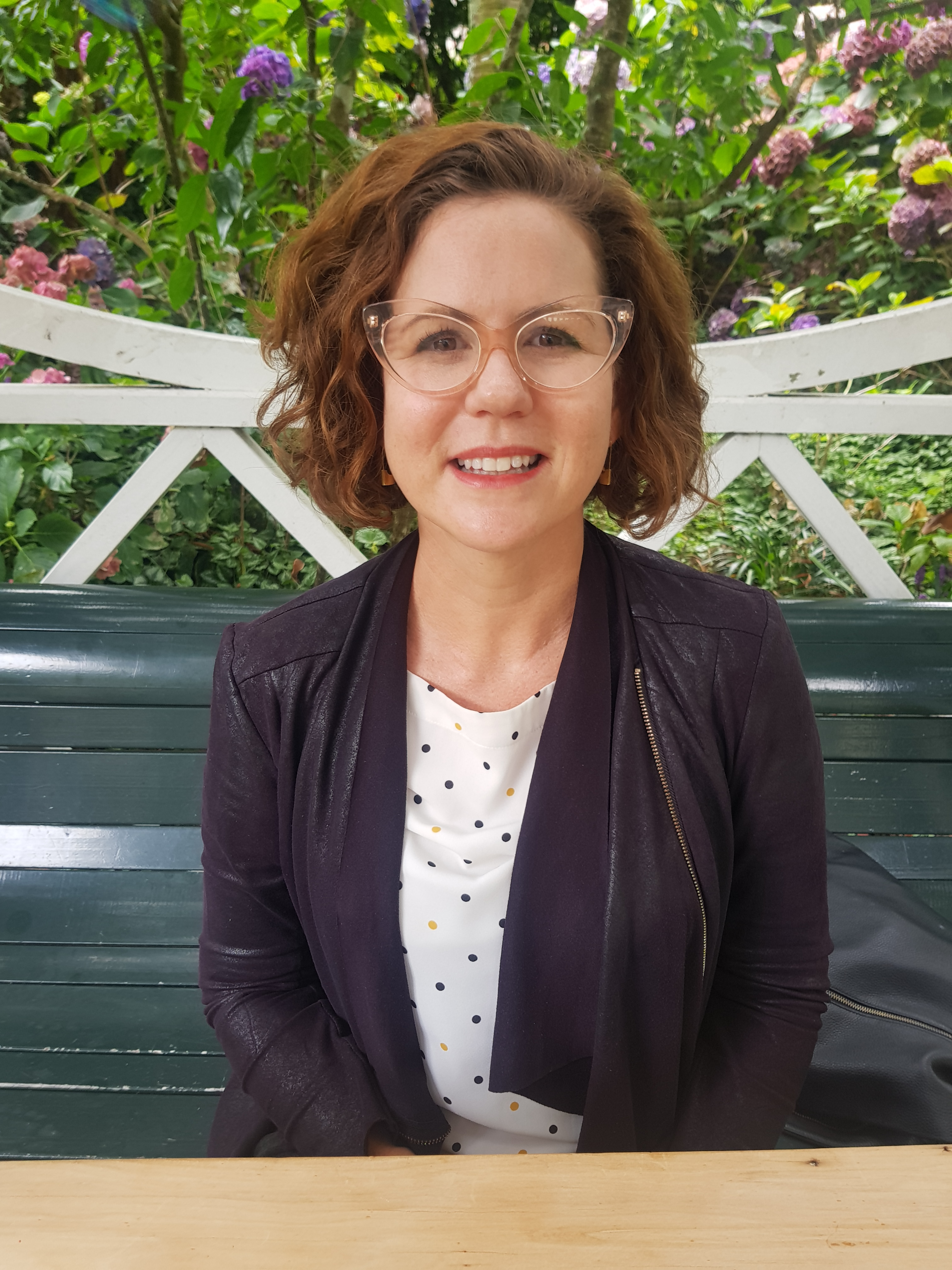
- Fifield in 2018
- Born: 14 March 1976 (age 50); Hastings, Hawke's Bay, New Zealand
- Occupations: Journalist, correspondent
- Employer: The Washington Post

Anna Fifield (born 14 March 1976) is a New Zealand foreign correspondent who writes a newsletter about New Zealand's place in the world, called Between Giants. She also contributes to other outlets including Radio New Zealand, Television New Zealand and the Spinoff. She turned to focus on New Zealand after 25 years in international journalist, at both the Financial Times and the Washington Post, with postings in Beijing, Tehran, Beirut, Seoul, Tokyo and Washington, D.C. She was also Asia-Pacific editor at the Washington Post and previously spent two years as editor of The Dominion Post.

== Career ==
Raised in Hastings, Fifield got her start writing for the Rotorua Daily Post and the NZPA wire service. In 2001 at the age of 25 she headed to London and secured a job at the Financial Times, where she worked for 13 years, mainly as a foreign correspondent.

She was US Political Correspondent in Washington, D.C. between 2009 and 2013, and was previously Middle East correspondent in Beirut and Tehran, and Korea Correspondent in Seoul. She was Tokyo bureau chief for The Washington Post from 2014 to 2018, and became the Beijing bureau chief. Fifield has reported from more than 20 countries, including Iran, Iraq, Syria, Libya and North Korea. Over 20 years she covered the first nuclear test by North Korea in 2006, the disputed Iranian presidential election of 2009, and the 2012 US presidential election. She has been to North Korea more than a dozen times.

In reporting on North Korea, she highlighted the difficulties faced by ordinary North Koreans, especially in the Kim Jong-un era. In 2017, she interviewed more than 25 recent escapees from North Korea, producing a major report that was published in both English and Korean. This was the first time The Washington Post had published in Korean. She also secured the only interview with Kim Jong-un's aunt, who had been living in the United States since 1998. She wrote about young North Korean escapees making a new life for themselves in South Korea, offering a different narrative from the usual portrayal of North Koreans as helpless victims. Fifield became the first person to ever go live on Facebook from North Korea in 2016. She covered the story of deceased US student Otto Warmbier, who was released from imprisonment in North Korea.

Interviewing numerous people who have met Kim Jong-un, Fifield has sought to show through reporting that he is not a cartoon villain or a joke, but a ruthless dictator operating strategically, even if that strategy involves killing his own uncle and half-brother in order to stay in power. Fifield's book The Great Successor: The Divinely Perfect Destiny of Brilliant Comrade Kim Jong Un, was published in June 2019, and has since been translated into 24 languages.

She was a Nieman Fellow in Journalism (August 2013 through May 2014) at Harvard University, where she studied how change happens in closed societies. In 2018, she was awarded the Shorenstein Journalism Award from Stanford University for excellence in reporting on Asia. "Fifield exemplifies how crucial it is to get the complexities of Asia right and the profound role of journalism in shaping public and decision maker approaches to our counterparts in the region," the university said.

After covering the coronavirus epidemic, Fifield returned to New Zealand in 2020, and in July became the editor of The Dominion Post and Stuff's Wellington newsroom. She took up her position on 5 October 2020 and left it in December 2022.

In 2022, Fifield announced that she was returning to the Washington Post as its Asia-Pacific editor, overseeing correspondents covering China, Japan, the Koreas, South-East Asia and Australia/New Zealand/the Pacific.

== Education ==
- 2013–2014 – Harvard University, Fellow, Nieman Foundation for Journalism
- 1997 – University of Canterbury, Post-graduate Diploma, Journalism
- 1994–1996 – Victoria University of Wellington, Bachelor of Arts, English language and literature

== Select publications ==
- Fifield, Anna. Life under Kim Jong Un The Washington Post, 17 November 2017
- Fifield, Anna. Kim Jong Un wants to stay in power — and that is an argument against nuclear war The Washington Post, 10 August 2017
- Fifield, Anna. North Korea's leader is a lot of things — but irrational is not one of them.] The Washington Post, March 25, 2017
- Fifield, Anna. China and US agree non-binding climate plan – Financial Times, 10 July 2013.
- Fifield, Anna, Japan's Leader Stops Short of WWII Apology], The Washington Post, 14 August 2015. (with 1:45 embedded video)
- Anna Fifield, S. Koreans Make Big Sacrifices to Study Overseas, (paper presented at the annual meeting for the Association for Asian Studies, ... 1996); Chang-sik Shin and Ian Shaw, “Social Policy in South Korea: Cultural and Structural Factors in the Emergence of Welfare" First published: 23 June 2003. doi:10.1111/1467-9515.00343

-Reprinted in: Los Angeles Times, 16 January 2006, Josh C. H. Lin (El Monte, CA: Pacific Asian Press, 1998), 95–112. in Encyclopedia of Asian American Issues Today, Volume 1, by Edith Wen-Chu Chen.
-Reprinted in: Encyclopedia of Asian American Issues Today, co-edited by Edith Wen-Chu Chen and Grace J. Yoo, 2010. Social Science.

- Fifield, Anna (2019). The Great Successor: The Secret Rise and Rule of Kim Jong Un. London: John Murray Press. ISBN 978-1-5293-8724-7.
