= 2019 Wellington City Council election =

- 12 October 2019
- Turnout: 41.20% ▼ ~pp (61,061 out of 148,191 enrolled voters)
- Mayoral election
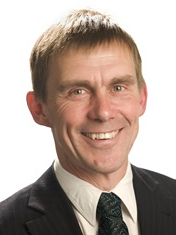

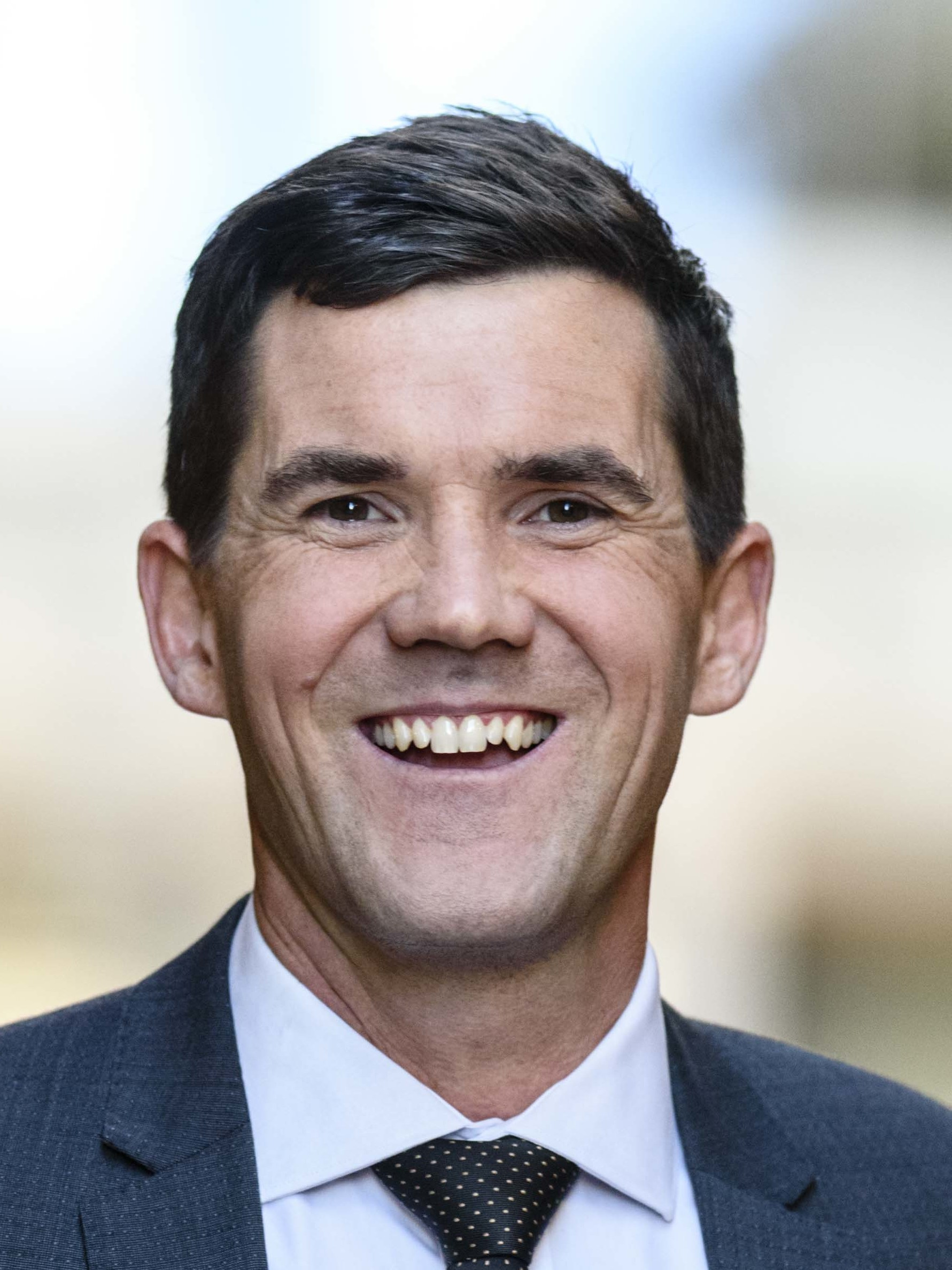
Candidate	Andy Foster	Justin Lester
Party	Independent	Labour
Final round votes	27,364	27,302
Percentage	45.28%	45.18%
First choice votes	19,323	20,830
Percentage	31.97%	34.47%
Mayor before election
Justin Lester
Labour
Elected mayor
Andy Foster
Independent
- Council election
- All 14 seats available
Party	Leader	Vote %	Seats	+/–
Independents			8	0
Labour			3	0
Green			3	0
This lists parties that won seats. See the complete results below.

The 2019 Wellington City Council election took place on 12 October 2019, to elect the Mayor of Wellington, city councillors, and community board members for the 2019–2022 term, as part of nation-wide local elections.

== Electoral system ==
The fourteen councilors were elected across five wards, while the Mayor was elected at large. All offices were elected through a single transferable vote (STV) system done via postal voting.

Candidates could not spend more than $60,000 on electoral expenses and had to disclose details of any donations larger than $1,500.

== Background ==
=== Wellington Convention Centre ===
In December 2015 the Wellington City Council bought land opposite Te Papa to build a convention centre. The council agreed to give a 25 year lease on the bottom two floors to the Movie Museum Limited, an organisation owned by Peter Jackson, Fran Walsh, Richard Taylor and Tania Roger. In March 2017 it was revealed that the Museum was delaying construction as its plans hadn't been finished. Delays on constructuion continued and in August of that year's, the museum's lease was cancelled. Eventually in August 2019 work on the convention center began.

=== Shelly Bay ===
In February 2016 property developer Ian Cassel's company, The Wellington Company, proposed a partnership with the Port Nicholson Block Settlement Trust for a mixed use development in Shelly Bay. Beneficiaries of the Port Nicholson Block Settlement Trust voting against selling the land, but in July of the following year the board of the Trust and Cassells would renegotiate terms and the Board sold the land anyways. The trust sold the land for 2 million dollars despite buying it for 13.3 million dollars.

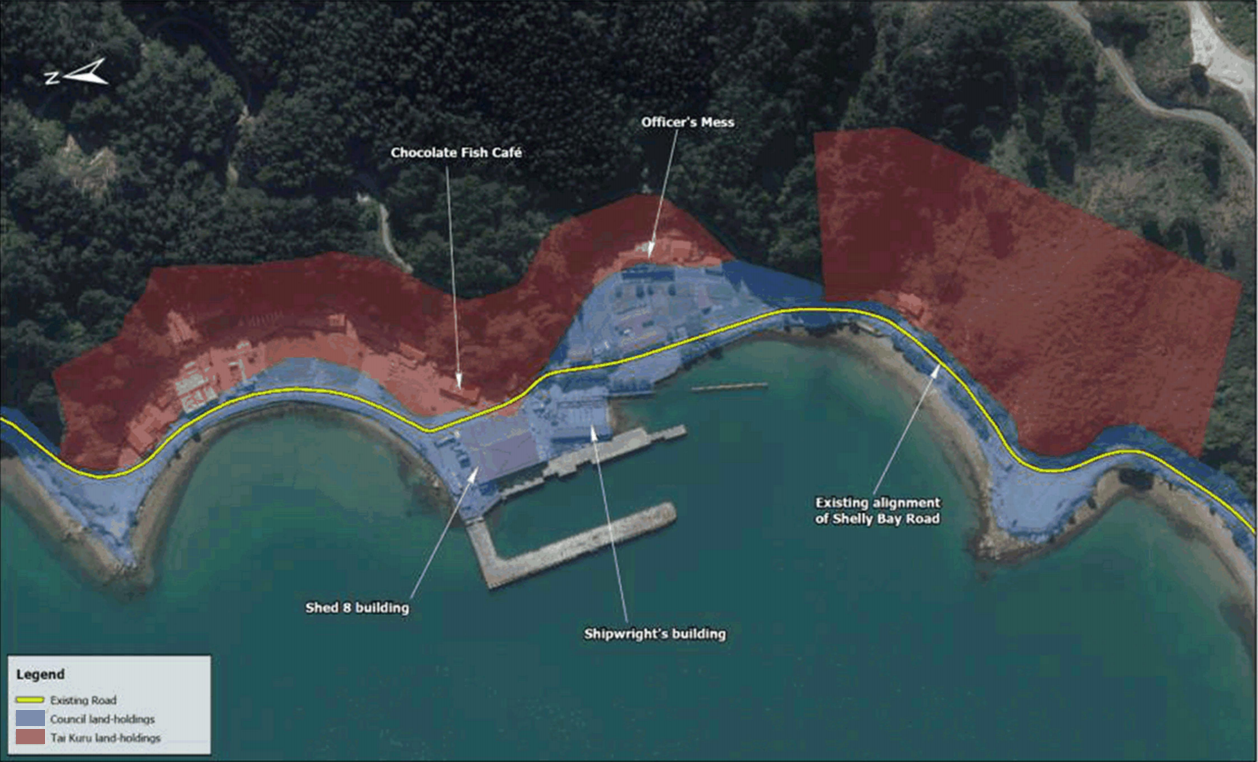
Map showing ownership of Shelly Bay as of April 2017

Pending resource consent the council received 1100 public submissions on the development, 51% of which were negative, and faced opposition from the public along with Peter Jackson and Fran Walsh. September 2017 the Council approved the resource consent for the development and agreed to sell land to the company for the development. A local business group, the "Miramar Business Improvement District" appealed to the High Court for a judicial review of the consent but was rejected.

=== Incumbents not seeking re-election ===
Incumbent Independent councillor Simon Marsh and Green councillor David Lee did not run again in the Motukairangi/Eastern Ward and the Paekawakawa/Southern Ward respectively.

== Results ==
=== Mayor ===
Ten candidates announced that they would run for mayor, including incumbent Justin Lester.

==== Fundraising and endorsements ====
Andy Foster

Endorsements

- Peter Jackson, Director

Donations

- $5,000 - Portsmouth Rentals, film equipment rental agency
- $10,00 - Park Road Post, post production facility
- $10,000 Maudi Trust
- 15,000 - Weta Digital, visual effects company
- $10,000 - Phil Sprey, concert promoter
- $5,000 - Antipodes, skincare company
- $4,738 - Building Solutions, construction company

Expenses

- $58,066.32
Justin Lester (Labour)

Endorsements

- Celia Wade-Brown, former mayor
- Unions Wellington, trade union federation

Donations

- $5,000 - E tū, trade union

Expenses

- $16,284.38

==== Results ====
2019 Wellington City mayoral election
Party	Candidate	FPv%	Count							
Party	Candidate	FPv%	1	2	3	4	5	6	7	8
Andy for Wellington	Andy Foster	31.97%	19,323	19,345	19,411	19,493	19,567	20,457	22,062	27,364
Labour	Justin Lester†	34.47%	20,830	20,845	20,904	20,965	21,084	22,446	24,620	27,302
Your Advocate	Diane Calvert	13.87%	8,385	8,405	8,429	8,493	8,584	9,335	11,471	
YIMBY Futureproof Wellington	Jenny Condie	9.76%	5,901	5,925	5,957	6,005	6,143	7,227		
For a Better Wellington	Conor Hill	7.54%	4,555	4,566	4,612	4,658	4,796			
Independent	Norbert Hausberg	0.93%	562	576	592	632				
Independent	Ajay Rathod	0.66%	399	406	426					
Plain Talk – Growth Is Bad 4 WGT Mayor	Don McDonald	0.54%	329	340						
aaacnp	Andrew Cox	0.25%	151							
Valid: 60,435 Spoilt: 626 Quota: first iteration: 30,218, last iteration: 27,333

Sankey diagram of the mayoral election results.

=== Councillors ===
† indicates the incumbent candidate

==== Takapū/Northern Ward ====
The Takapū/Northern ward returned three councillors to the city council.

2019 Wellington City Council Takapū/Northern Ward Election
Party	Candidate	FPv%	Count						
Party	Candidate	FPv%	1	2	3	4	5	6	7
Independent	Jill Day†	27.77%	3,404	3,065	3,125	3,125	3,134	2,981	3,316
Moderate Independent	Malcolm Sparrow†	17.10%	2,098	2,173	2,220	2,322	2,507	2,546	2,997
YIMBY Futureproof Wellington	Jenny Condie	16.37%	2,007	2,079	2,136	2,220	2,367	2,402	2,900
Labour	Peter Gilberd†	13.34%	1,635	1,717	1,761	1,859	1,989	2,029	2,259
Wellington Party	John Apanowicz	12.24%	1,500	1,533	1,598	1,664	1,925	1,944	
Political Parties have NO PLACE in Local Govt	Graeme Sawyer	5.96%	731	747	818	866			
Independent	John Peters	3.93%	482	493	519				
Independent	Tracy Hurst-Porter	3.27%	401						
Valid: 12,258 Spoilt: 452 Quota: first iteration: 3,064.5, last iteration: 2,868.02

==== Wharangi/Onslow-Western Ward ====
The Wharangi/Onslow-Western ward returns three councillors to the Wellington City Council. Andy Foster was an incumbent in this ward and ran for reelection but his candidacy was superseded by his victory in the mayoral race, and his votes were redistributed according to next preferences.

2019 Wellington City Council Wharangi/Onslow-Western Ward Election
Party	Candidate	FPv%	Count									
Party	Candidate	FPv%	1	2	3	4	5	6	7	8	9	10
Your Advocate	Diane Calvert†	26.92%	4,141	3,846	4,082	3,793	3,904	3,756	4,133	3,714	3,724	3,945
Independent	Simon Woolf†	19.00%	2,923	3,014	3,211	3,306	3,398	3,447	3,756	3,852	3,684	3,916
Labour	Rebecca Matthews	14.58%	2,243	2,277	2,358	2,393	2,896	2,916	3,073	3,142	3,166	3,815
Independent	Michelle Rush	7.78%	1,196	1,232	1,372	1,412	1,680	1,703	1,946	2,036	2,073	2,472
For a Better Wellington	Conor Hill	8.05%	1,239	1,269	1,365	1,396	1,597	1,614	1,867	1,932	1,959	
Independent	Rohan Biggs	8.28%	1,274	1,307	1,426	1,464	1,549	1,569				
Green	Richard McIntosh	8.41%	1,293	1,307	1,359	1,374						
Independent	Ray Chung	6.98%	1,073	1,108								
Valid: 15,382 Spoilt: 310 Quota: first iteration: 3845.50, last iteration: 3536.95

==== Pukehīnau/Lambton Ward ====
The Pukehīnau/Lambton ward returns three councillors to the Wellington City Council.

2019 Wellington City Council Takapū/Northern Ward Election
Party	Candidate	FPv%	Count					
Party	Candidate	FPv%	1	2	3	4	5	6
Green	Iona Pannett†	31.78%	3,220	2,539	2,578	2,512	2,607	2,571
Independent	Nicola Young†	25.31%	2,565	2,652	2,547	2,517	2,561	2,678
Independent	Tamatha Paul	19.21%	1,947	2,134	2,253	2,279	2,483	2,770
Labour	Brian Dawson†	12.03%	1,219	1,431	1,500	1,530	1,624	1,758
Independent	Shan Ng	4.95%	502	544	592	606	670	
Independent	Lee Orchard	4.12%	417	490	549	561		
Independent	Harry Smith	2.60%	263	290				
Valid: 10,133 Spoilt: 287 Quota: first iteration: 2,533.25, last iteration: 2,444.17

==== Motukairangi/Eastern Ward ====
The Motukairangi-Eastern ward returns three councillors to the Wellington City Council.

2019 Wellington City Council Motukairangi-Eastern Ward Election
Party	Candidate	FPv%	Count				
Party	Candidate	FPv%	1	2	3	4	5
Green	Sarah Free†	26.48%	3,019	2,883	2,920	3,052	2,799
Labour	Teri O'Neill	19.33%	2,204	2,305	2,408	2,872	2,895
Wellington Party	Sean Rush	17.43%	1,988	2,061	2,247	2,692	2,764
Independent	Chris Calvi-Freeman†	17.52%	1,998	2,072	2,176	2,416	2,501
Independent	Steph Edlin	11.44%	1,305	1,368	1,488		
Independent	Bernard O'Shaughnessy	5.21%	594	645			
Independent	Ajay Rathod	2.59%	295				
Valid: 11,403 Spoilt: 528 Quota: first iteration: 2,850.75, last iteration: 2,739.83

==== Paekawakawa/Southern Ward ====
The Paekawakawa/Southern ward returns two councillors to the Wellington City Council.

2019 Wellington City Council Paekawakawa/Southern Ward Election
Party	Candidate	FPv%	Count
Party	Candidate	FPv%	1
Labour	Fleur Fitzsimons†	41.10%	3,967
Green	Laurie Foon	39.42%	3,805
Independent	Humphrey Hanley	12.94%	1,249
Independent	Thomas Morgan	6.55%	632
Valid: 9,653 Spoilt: 414 Quota: 3,217.67

== Other local elections ==
=== Tawa Community Board ===
The Tawa Community Board is made up of 2 councilors along with 6 representatives who are voted in by residents of Tawa, Grenada North and Takapu Valley.

2019 Tawa Community Board Election
Party	Candidate	FPv%	Count								
Party	Candidate	FPv%	1	2	3	4	5	6	7	8	9
Independent	Steph Knight	20.06%	795	586.94	573.64	591.19	575.93	564.93	551.29	546.63	544.08
Independent	Richard Herbert	17.66%	700	592.93	582.35	583.00	600.74	566.05	551.83	546.21	543.59
Independent	Graeme Hansen†	14.69%	582	627.39	572.85	579.80	607.78	565.27	552.22	546.16	543.58
Independent	Robyn Parkinson†	11.48%	455	507.51	519.89	548.39	578.43	564.72	551.52	547.14	544.55
Independent	Jackson Lacy	9.36%	371	419.23	430.19	455.58	511.32	535.90	549.24	548.02	544.57
Independent	Anna Scott	8.02%	318	373.25	386.48	434.16	492.47	518.12	532.12	539.84	544.78
Independent	Damian Hewett	7.67%	304	357.57	377.21	400.19	459.14	490.63	505.89	514.12	519.15
Independent	John Peters	6.69%	265	278.87	284.54	298.05					
Independent	Bronwyn Thurston	4.37%	173	190.04	195.56						
Valid: 3,963 Spoilt: 200 Quota: first iteration: 566.14, last iteration: 540.61

=== Mākara / Ōhāriu Community Board ===
The Mākara / Ōhāriu Community Board is made up of 6 representatives voted in by residents of Mākara, Mākara Beach and Ōhāriu. Only six candidates ran so all won automatically.

2019 Mākara / Ōhāriu Community Board Election
Party	Candidate	FPv%	Count
Party	Candidate	FPv%	1
Independent	Wayne Rudd†		N/A
Independent	John Apanowicz†		N/A
Independent	Christine Grace†		N/A
Independent	Hamish Todd†		N/A
Independent	Chris Renner†		N/A
Independent	Darren Hoskins		N/A
Quota: N/A

== See also ==
- 2019 Greater Wellington Regional Council election
- 2019 Porirua City Council election
- 2019 Hutt City Council election
- 2019 Upper Hutt City Council election
- 2019 Kāpiti Coast District Council election
- 2019 New Zealand local elections
