= Andy Foster =

New Zealand politician (born 1961)

Andy Foster MP
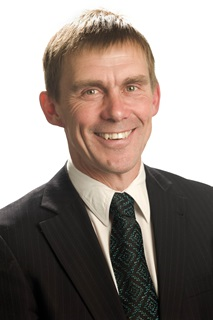

Member of the New Zealand Parliament for New Zealand First party list
- Incumbent
- Assumed office 14 October 2023

36th Mayor of Wellington
- In office 19 October 2019 – 15 October 2022
- Deputy: Sarah Free
- Preceded by: Justin Lester
- Succeeded by: Tory Whanau
- Majority: 62

Wellington City Councillor for Onslow-Western Ward
- In office 2004–2019

Wellington City Councillor for Western Ward
- In office 1992–2004

Personal details
- Born: Andrew John Whitfield Foster; 21 December 1961 (age 64) Pembury, Kent, England
- Party: New Zealand First (2017–present)
- Other political affiliations: National (until 1993)
- Spouse: Ann
- Children: 2
- Education: Victoria University of Wellington
- Website: andyfoster.org.nz

Andrew John Whitfield Foster MP (born 21 December 1961) is a New Zealand politician. He was elected to the New Zealand House of Representatives as a list MP for the New Zealand First party in the 2023 New Zealand general election.

He was previously Mayor of Wellington from 2019 to 2022 and a Wellington City Councillor for nine terms from 1992 until 2019.

Foster has described himself as a "Bluegreen", a conservative environmentalist.

== Early life and family ==
Foster was born on 21 December 1961 in Pembury, Kent, England, and moved with his family to New Zealand aged 5, originally settling in the Wellington suburbs of Ngaio and Khandallah before becoming a long-term Karori resident. He became a naturalised New Zealand citizen in 1978. Foster attended Wellington College and later studied at Victoria University of Wellington, gaining a Bachelor of Arts in history and economic history and a Bachelor of Commerce in business management.

He shares two children with his wife, Ann.

== Local government political career ==
In the late 1980s Foster became politically active and joined the National Party and worked as a parliamentary researcher for National for three years. When party colleagues were looking for people to stand in local government, Foster accepted nomination and stood for election in the 1992 local elections for the Wellington City Council on a Citizens' ticket. He was successful winning a seat from the Western Ward. Citizens did not operate as a ticket post-election. He held a seat in the Western Ward until 2004 when local electoral boundaries were re-drawn and he stood for the newly created Onslow-Western Ward and held a seat from there until 2019.

Foster stood for Mayor of Wellington on four occasions; first in 2001, coming fourth, then in 2016 placing fifth. Foster announced his third campaign for the mayoralty at the 2019 local elections and gained endorsement from Sir Peter Jackson. In a surprise, he narrowly beat the one-term incumbent, Justin Lester, by 62 votes after special and last-minute votes had been counted. Lester became the first Wellington mayor in 33 years to be replaced after just one term.

Foster was the president, and is now a life member, of TRAFINZ, which represents local authority views in New Zealand regarding road safety and traffic management. As a city councillor he was appointed to the boards of council-owned companies Capital Power (1991–1992), Wellington International Airport from 1996 to 1998, and Wellington Water's predecessor Capacity Infrastructure (2004–2014).

=== Mayor of Wellington, 2019–2022 ===
Significant policies undertaken in his tenure included the funding of the climate change "Te Atakura – First to Zero" action plan and the announcement of preferred options for the Let's get Wellington Moving transport infrastructure package. This included a second Mount Victoria Tunnel and a mass transit route from the Wellington railway station via the Basin Reserve to Newtown and Island Bay.

In April 2021, local mana whenua iwi Ngati Toa Rangatira and Taranaki Whanui were invited to have a representative with voting rights at council committee meetings. On 30 April 2022, a new strategic partnership was signed with local Iwi at Pipitea Marae.

In July 2021, Foster received acclaim from colleagues typically referenced as his political adversaries for his decision to light up the exterior of the council-owned Michael Fowler Centre with the colours of the transgender flag following confirmation a group considered by some to be transgender-exclusionary would speak there. In addition, Foster attended a counter-rally with Labour Party councilors Fleur Fitzsimons and Teri O'Neill, draped in the transgender flag.

In October 2021, Foster expressed disagreement with the Sixth Labour Government's Three Waters reform programme, which proposes transferring the management of water utilities from local councils to four new entities.

In October 2022, Foster became the third person in 36 years to hold the Wellington mayoralty for just one term. Voters selected Tory Whanau to replace him, with her gaining over twice as many votes after seven rounds of preferences.

== Member of Parliament ==
New Zealand Parliament
Years	Term	Electorate	List	Party
2023–2026	54th	List	7	NZ First
2026–present	55th	List	11	NZ First

Foster stood unsuccessfully for Parliament on two occasions. In 1996, he stood as an independent in the 1996 New Zealand general election for Wellington Central. In the leadup to the 2017 general election Foster contemplated standing for Parliament as a candidate for New Zealand First. On 15 August 2017 he was confirmed as the New Zealand First candidate for the Wellington Central electorate. He was placed 18 on the party's list, too low to be elected. Foster did not stand for Parliament while Mayor of Wellington. On 5 September 2023, Foster confirmed that he would be standing as New Zealand First's candidate in the Mana electorate during the 2023 general election. Foster had initially denied he was running for the party two weeks earlier. He was placed at 7 on the party list.

During the 2023 election, Foster came fourth place in the Mana electorate, gaining 1,848 votes. With New Zealand First's election night result of 6.46% entitling it to eight MPs, Foster was elected as a list MP.

During the 2026 New Zealand general election scheduled for 7 November, Foster stood in the Remutaka electorate for NZ First. He was ranked 11th place on the party list. Based on preliminary results, Foster came third place in Remutaka with 3,407 votes. He was re-elected to Parliament on the NZ First party list.

== Community activities ==
Foster has been involved with the Karori Wildlife Sanctuary Trust, Karori Sports Club, and the Karori Brooklyn Community Trust.
