= 2016 Wellington mayoral election =

New Zealand local election

- 8 October 2016
- Turnout: 64,656 (45.56%)
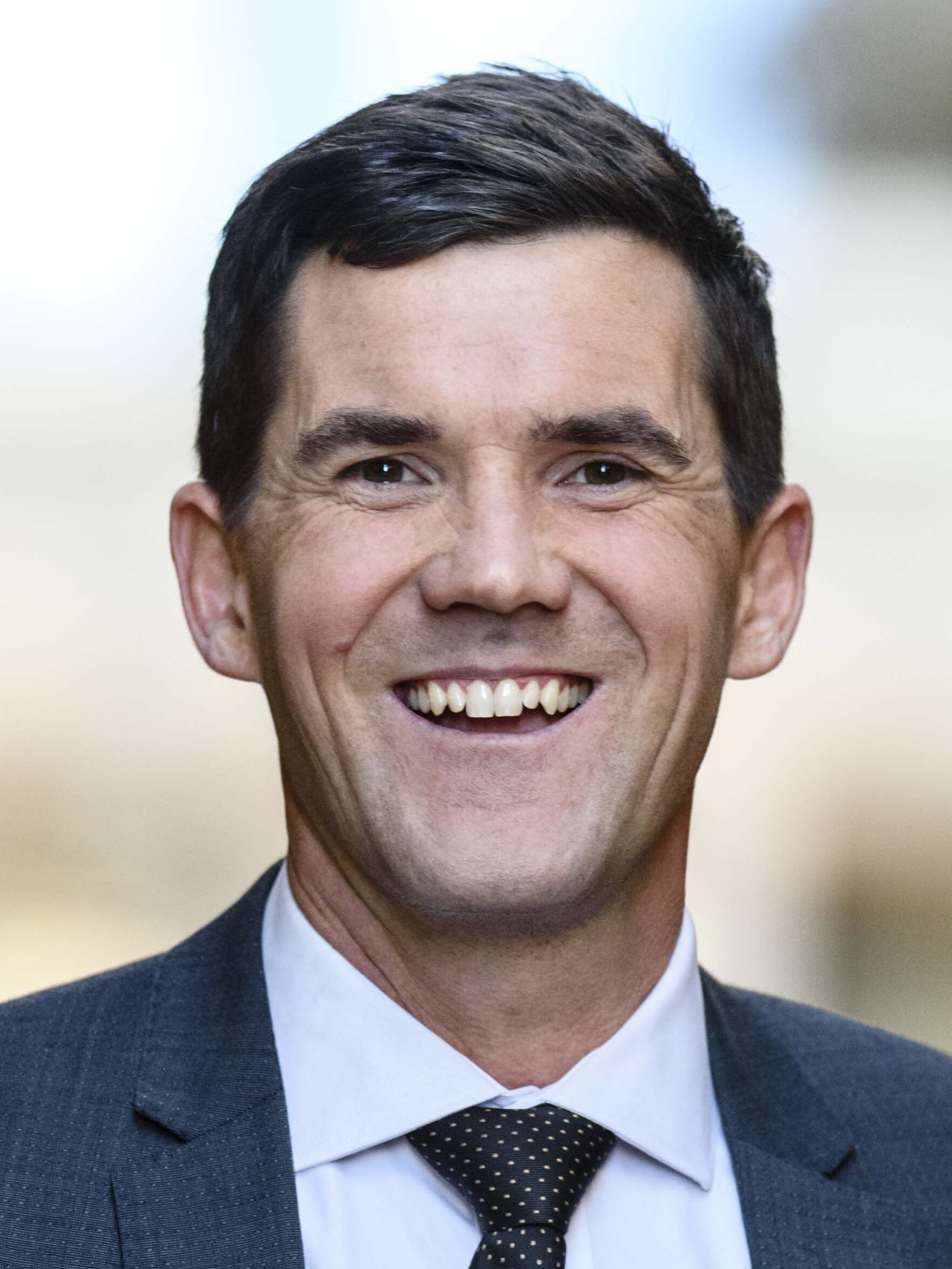

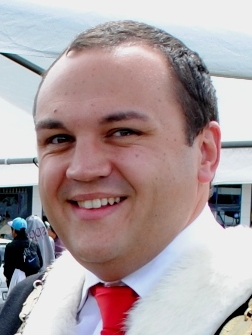

Candidate	Justin Lester	Nick Leggett	Jo Coughlan
Party	Labour	Independent	Independent
Primary vote	23,751	16,528	16,528
Percentage	36.7%	25.6%	20.4%
Final count	31,921	31,921
Percentage	56.4%	43.6%
Mayor before election
Celia Wade-Brown
Independent
Elected mayor
Justin Lester
Labour

The 2016 Wellington mayoral election was part of the New Zealand local elections and was held on 8 October to determine the next mayor of Wellington. The incumbent was Celia Wade-Brown, who was first elected in the 2010 mayoral election. Wade-Brown did not seek re-election. Her title was pursued by her deputy, Justin Lester, councillors Jo Coughlan, Andy Foster, Helene Ritchie and Nicola Young, former mayor of Porirua City Nick Leggett, and independent candidates Keith Johnson and Johnny Overton.

Lester won the election becoming the 35th Mayor of Wellington, Leggett came second and Coughlan third.

== Candidates ==
Wade-Brown decided against standing for a third term as mayor. However, eight other candidates sought her position.

=== Confirmed ===
Name	Photo	Affiliation	Description	Endorsements
Jo Coughlan		Independent	Coughlan was first elected as Councillor for the Onslow-Western ward in 2007. Previously, Coughlan gave serious consideration to running for Mayor in the 2013 election. Coughlan was chair of the Council Economic Growth and Arts Committee and is a member of other committees, including the Environment and Community, Sports and Recreation Committees. She ran as an independent candidate, but was a press secretary for Sir Don McKinnon (National) while he was serving as the Minister of Foreign Affairs. She is the sister-in-law of then Deputy Prime Minister, Bill English.	Kerry Prendergast (former mayor); Fran Wilde (former mayor); Jack Yan (former mayoral candidate)
Andy Foster		Independent	Veteran councillor Andy Foster, the council's then Transport and Urban Development Committee Chairman, had served the Wellington City Council for well over two decades. He also sought re-election as a councillor in the Onslow-Western Ward.	
Keith Johnson		Independent	Dr Keith Johnson, an economic policy analyst and blogger from Island Bay, announced his candidacy in April 2016. Johnson ran for the Southern Ward in 2010 with the Labour Party alongside Paul Eagle and in 2013 proposed to stand for mayor. He subsequently withdrew, saying that "There was not much resonance in the concerns I had for debt control and against the rebalancing of rates".	
Nick Leggett		Independent	Leggett had been the mayor of Porirua City since 2010. In March 2016, he announced he would not stand in the next local body elections, hinting at running in the election for mayor in Wellington City. In April, Leggett resigned from the Labour Party and confirmed his intention to stand. Central to his launch campaign speech was a desire to put an end to the "bickering" and "palace politics" holding the Wellington City Council back, resolve transport issues including supporting twin tunnels to the airport, and to facilitate (not fund) a new Sports Museum and Virtual Reality Centre for Wellington.	Mark Blumsky (former mayor)
Justin Lester		Labour	Lester was first elected as a Wellington City Councillor in 2010. When mayors were given the ability to choose their deputy without involving councillors after the 2013 election, Wade-Brown chose Lester. Lester ran on a Labour Party ticket. He went on to win the election.	Andrew Little (Leader of the Opposition); Celia Wade-Brown (retiring mayor)
Johnny Overton		Localisation Party	Overton announced his candidacy in early August 2016. He is a fringe dwelling guerrilla gardener, artist & political activist. In the 2014 general election he contested the seat of Rongotai for the 'Peoples Revolutionary Front', finishing in last place with 0.12% of the vote.	
Helene Ritchie		Independent	Helene Ritchie announced her candidacy for the mayoralty, her 11th term as councillor, and a position on the District Health Board on the day nominations for local elections opened. Days before the nominations closed, Ritchie opted to campaign only for the mayoralty, withdrawing from all other contests except for the Capital and Coast DHB. She had previously served as Deputy Mayor and leader of the Labour caucus on council.	
Nicola Young		Freeze rates and cut waste	Young was first elected in 2013. She originally stood only for the city council, but then also nominated herself for the mayoralty. Of the six mayoral candidates, she came fourth. Young is an independent councillor; she formerly stood for the National Party in the 2005 general election in Wellington's Rongotai electorate. Her father was the former cabinet minister Bill Young, and she is the sister of former National list MP Annabel Young.	

=== Withdrew ===
Celia Wade-Brown

Wade-Brown was first elected as a Wellington City Councillor in 1994 and apart from a three-year break served on council until she was elected mayor in the 2010 election. Whilst she has always stood as an independent during her mayoralty, she is generally associated with the Green Party of Aotearoa New Zealand, and The Dominion Post commented that "everything about her shouts 'Green'". On 5 August, Wade-Brown pulled out of the race. Wade-Brown announced her endorsement of Justin Lester as her preferred successor on 2 September.

== Opinion polling ==
Several polls were conducted indicating a tight race with Justin Lester, Jo Coughlan and Nick Leggett polling the strongest.

Date(s) administered	Sample size	Preference	Jo; Coughlan	[[Andy; Foster]]	Keith; Johnson	Nick; Leggett	Justin; Lester	Johnny; Overton	Helene; Ritchie	Nicola; Young	Other / Undecided
8–10 September 2016	559	First	17.5%	1.4%	–	17.4%	34.5%	–	3.5%	4.2%	16.3%
8–10 September 2016	559	Second	19%	14.4%	–	17.4%	13.1%	–	8%	3.9%	21.1%
11–14 September 2016	500	First	11.1%	1.1%	0.7%	19.2%	19.6%	0.%	1%	3.5%	43.8%
11–14 September 2016	500	Second	12%	2%	1%	13%	12%	1%	0%	5%	54%

== Results ==
2016 Wellington City mayoral election
Party	Candidate	FPv%	Count						
Party	Candidate	FPv%	1	2	3	4	5	6	7
Labour	Justin Lester	36.7	23,751	23,884	24,092	24,887	26,418	27,674	31,921
Independent	Nick Leggett	25.5	16,528	16,584	16,709	17,011	17,598	18,667	24,697
Independent	Jo Coughlan	20.4	13,203	13,233	13,347	13,602	14,190	15,844	
Independent	Nicola Young	6.6	4,303	4,367	4,598	5,104	5,532		
Independent	Andy Foster	4.8	3,125	3,168	3,304	3,718			
Independent	Helene Ritchie	3.7	2,439	2,538	2,733				
Independent	Keith Johnson	1.8	1,083	1,190					
Independent	Johnny Overton	0.9	620						
Electorate: Valid: 64,656 Spoilt: 511 Quota: Turnout: 45.56%

== Ward results ==
Candidates were also elected from wards to the Wellington City Council.

Party/ticket	Councillors
Independent	8
Labour	3
Greens	3
