= Sister cities of Wellington =

Wellington, the capital city of New Zealand, maintains partnerships with eight sister cities and one formally recognized friendship city. Six of these sister city relationships are formalized through written agreements, while two are informal but mutually acknowledged partnerships.

The following cities are partnered with Wellington:

- Harrogate, United Kingdom (since 1954)
- Chania, Greece (since 1984)
- Xiamen, China (since 1987)
- Sakai, Japan (since 1995)
- Taipei, Taiwan (since 1997)
- Tianjin, China (since 2000)
- Qingdao, China (since 2000)
- Beijing, China (since 2006)

Friendship city:

- Sydney, Australia
- Ramallah, Palestine (since 2025)

== Sister cities with formal agreements ==
=== Beijing ===
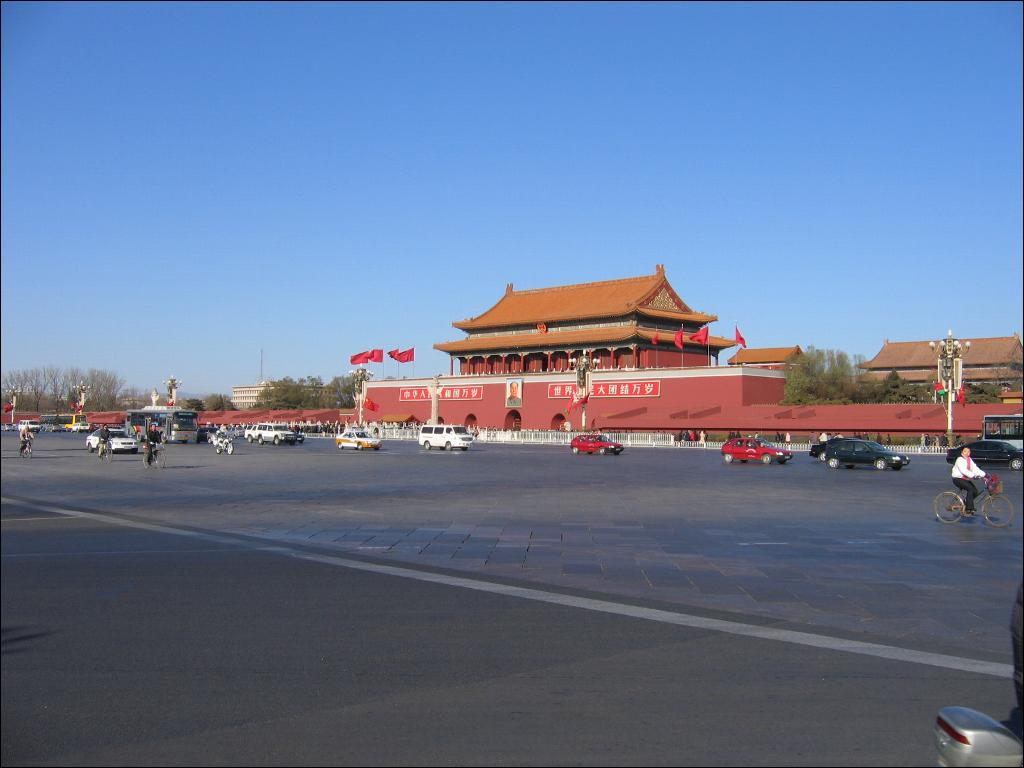
Tiananmen Square in Beijing

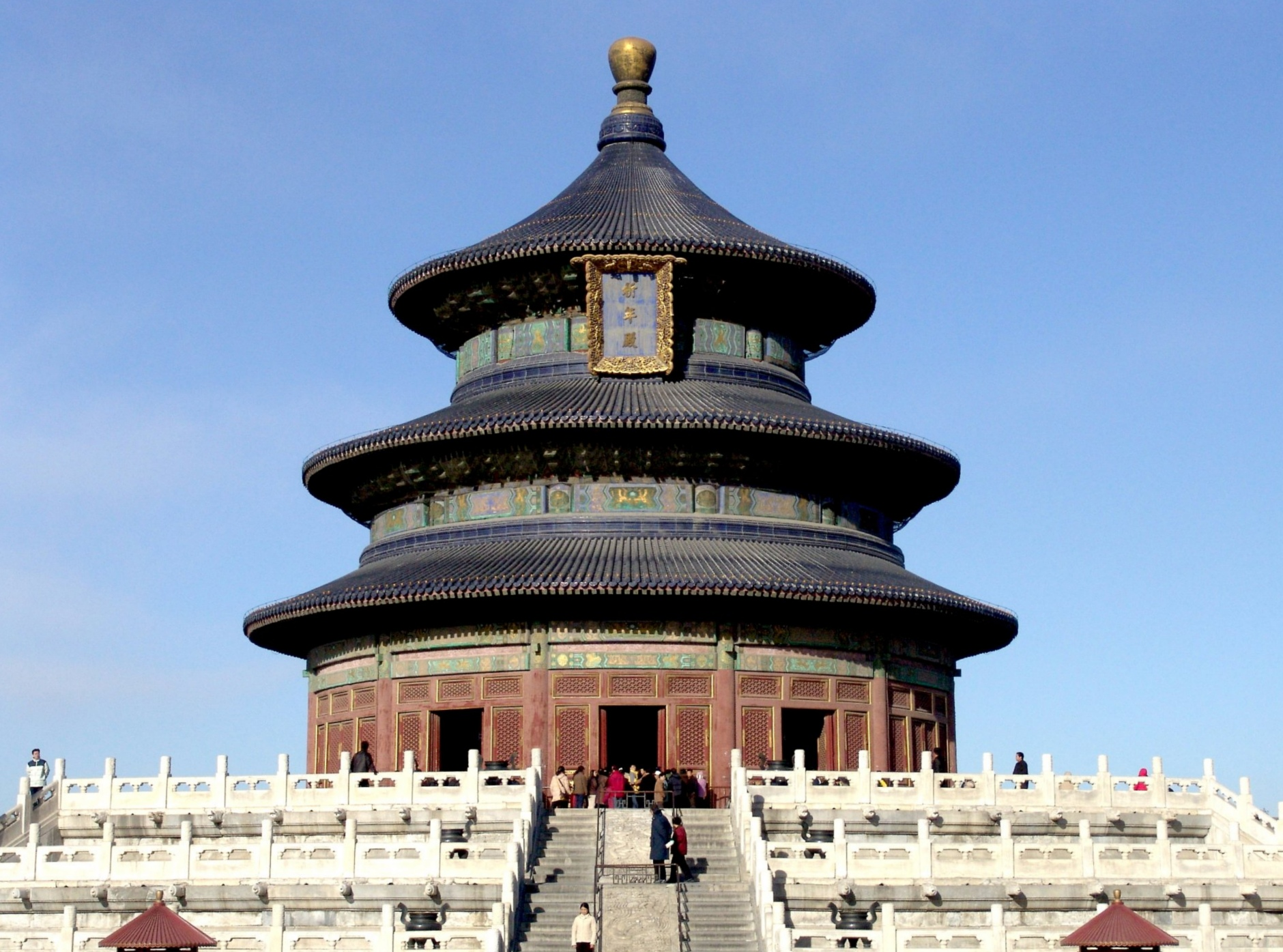
Temple of Heaven in Beijing

In 1994, Deng Lin, daughter of former Chinese leader Deng Xiaoping, visited Wellington and expressed her admiration for the city in subsequent interviews. That same year, Beijing's deputy mayor visited Wellington, followed by a visit from Wellington's deputy mayor to Beijing, during which the sister city agreement was finalized. Both cities described the partnership as enduring, based on mutual support and consistent cooperation.

The partnership was formally signed during the Sister Cities New Zealand 25th Anniversary Conference in May 2006. Wellington's mayor, Kerry Prendergast, and Beijing's deputy mayor, Sun Anmin, officiated the agreement.

New Zealand officials consider the partnership with Beijing particularly significant due to its status as the capital of a major global power. In February 2005, Beijing gifted Wellington a fireworks display to celebrate the Chinese New Year, marking the longest fireworks show in Wellington's history.

Collaborative activities between Wellington and Beijing include:

- Business and diplomatic visits
- Trade and earthquake preparedness exchanges
- Mayoral visits
- Teacher and student exchanges
- Jointly organized festivals and concerts

In May 2026, Wellington and Beijing celebrated the 20th anniversary of their sister-city relationship with a concert in Wellington.

=== Xiamen ===
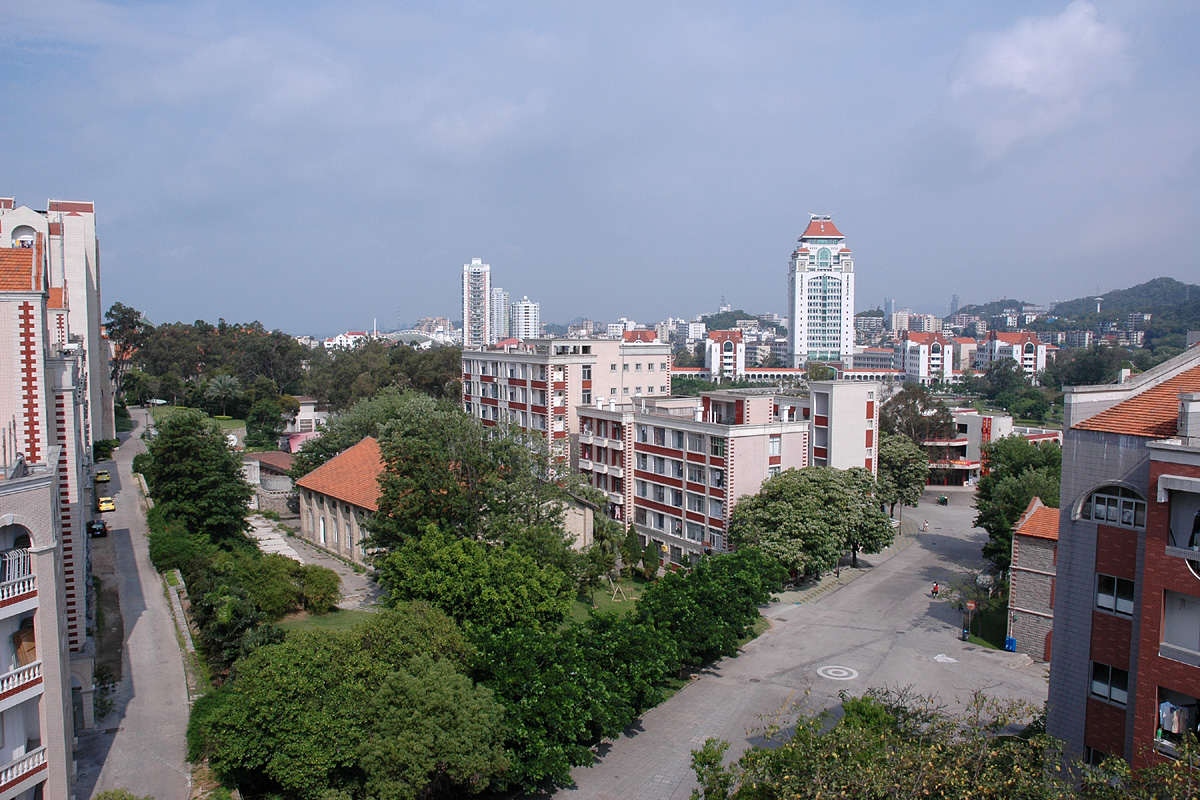
Panorama of Xiamen

In the 1980s, the Wellington City Council approached the Chinese embassy in Wellington to strengthen ties between New Zealand and Chinese cities. These efforts were reinforced during a visit by New Zealand Prime Minister David Lange. Chinese authorities proposed Xiamen as a partner due to its status as a Special Economic Zone and similarities with Wellington, such as climate.

The sister city agreement was signed in 1987. In 1998, the Wellington Xiamen Association was established to deepen collaboration, facilitating numerous diplomatic visits, discussions, and reforms.

=== Tianjin ===
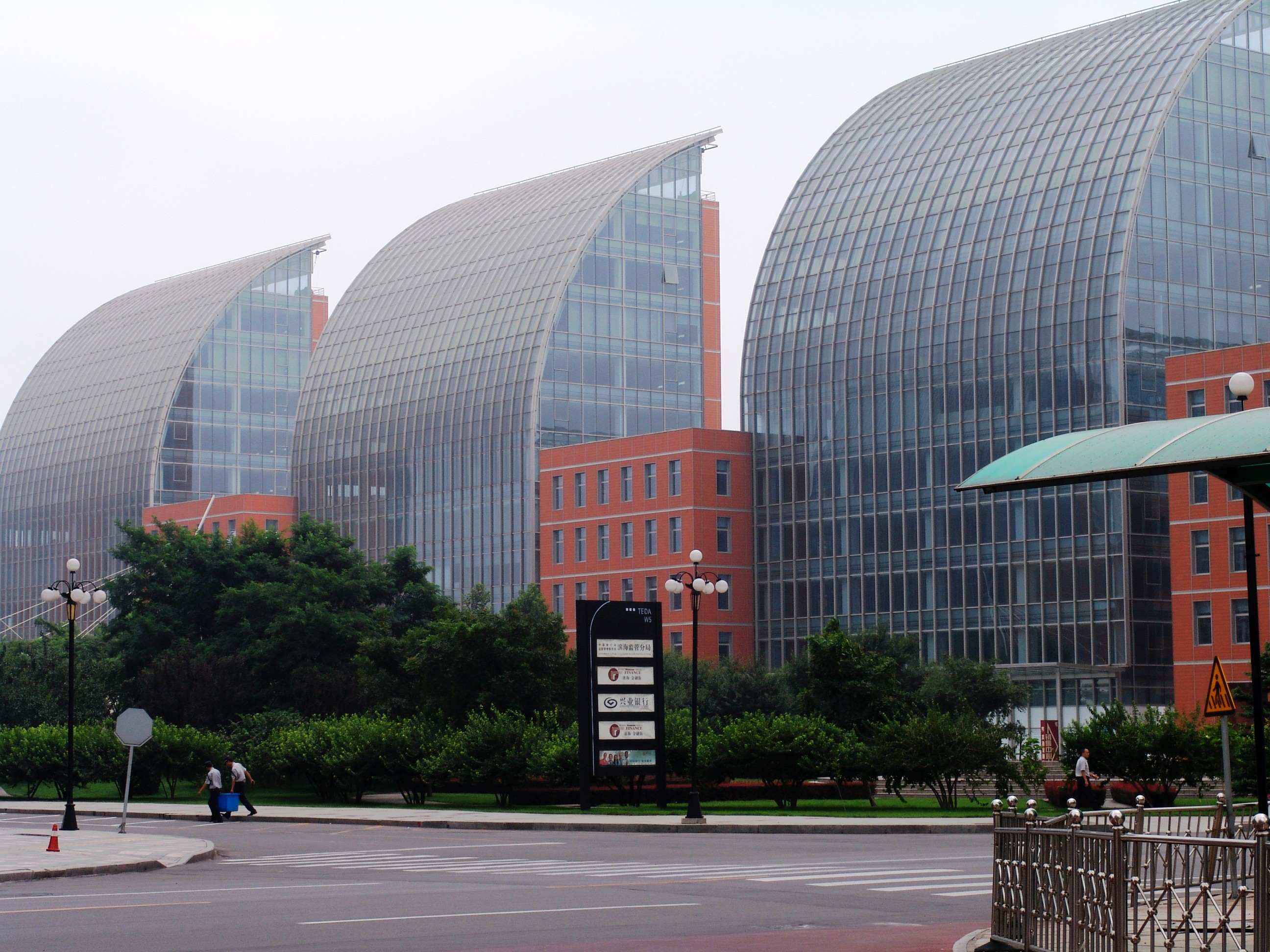
Modern buildings in Tianjin's Economic-Technological Development Area

Wellington and Tianjin formalized their sister city relationship in 2000 to collaborate on earthquake preparedness. Wellington's then-mayor, Mark Blumsky, visited Tianjin to sign the agreement.

This partnership aligns with the World Bank's Megacities Earthquake Mitigation Initiative, aimed at enhancing seismic resilience. The Chinese Seismological Bureau selected Tianjin as Wellington's partner to support this program. The collaboration focuses on sharing earthquake prevention strategies, mitigating impacts, and providing mutual aid for rebuilding and resource exchange.

=== Qingdao ===
The sister city agreement with Qingdao, signed in 2000, promotes student and teacher exchanges. The partnership encourages Chinese students to study in New Zealand, with over 1,000 Qingdao students currently enrolled in Wellington.

=== Sakai ===
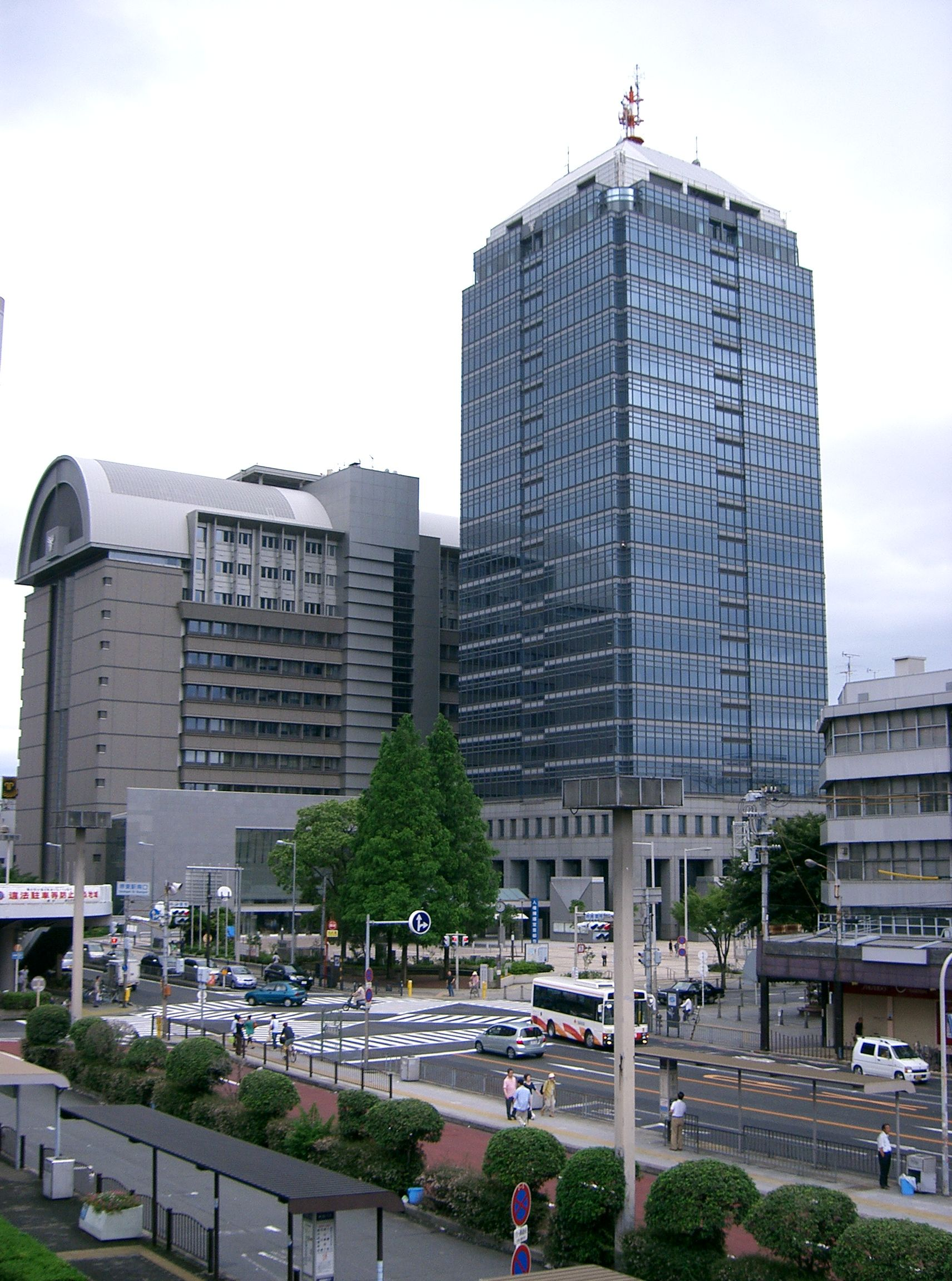
Sakai City Hall

In the 1980s, Japan's ambassador to New Zealand, Takeo Iguchi, proposed a partnership between Japan and New Zealand. In 1993, Wellington's then-mayor, Fran Wilde, visited Sakai and signed a preliminary agreement. The following year, Sakai's mayor, Hideo Hataya, led a delegation to Wellington. The partnership was formalized in 1995, alongside the establishment of the Wellington Sakai Association to support collaboration. Sakai also has a corresponding Sakai Wellington Association.

Collaborative activities include:

- Exchanges of teachers, students, and business professionals
- Youth sports competitions
- Exhibitions of paintings, sculptures, and ikebana

=== Taipei ===
In 1997, Wellington's deputy mayor, Kerry Prendergast, visited Taipei and met with deputy mayor Bai Hsiu-hsiung to sign a sister city agreement. In 1998, a 155-member delegation from Taipei visited Wellington, extending the partnership.

== Sister cities with informal agreements ==
=== Harrogate ===
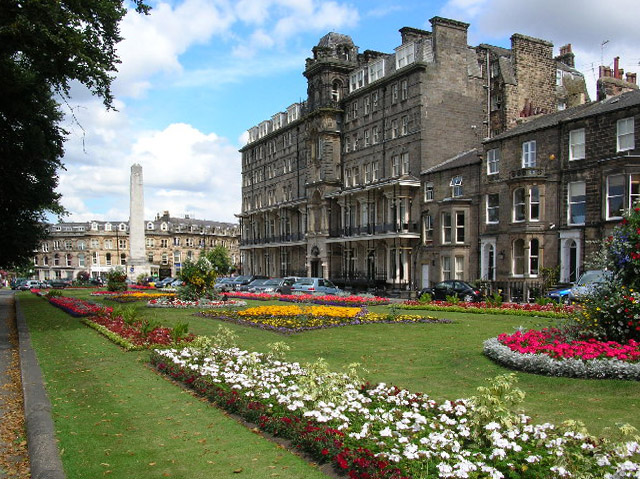
Cenotaph in Harrogate

The partnership with Harrogate traces back to World War II, when 23 New Zealand airmen were buried in Harrogate's cemetery. In 1954, Harrogate City Council gifted Wellington a buława crafted by a local goldsmith, often considered the start of the partnership. The mace is used in ceremonies involving both cities.

=== Chania ===
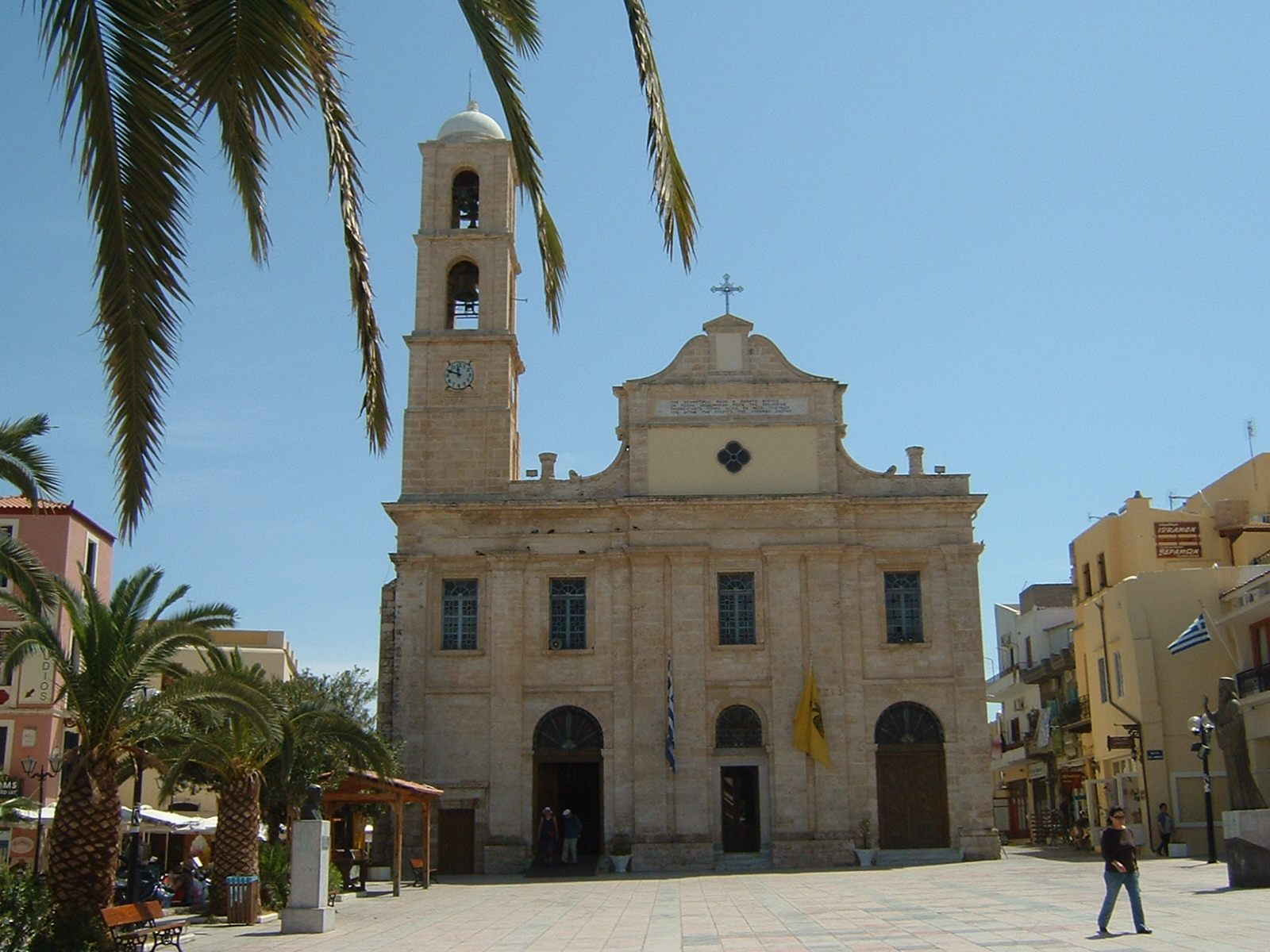
Orthodox cathedral in Chania

The informal partnership with Chania began in 1984 to honor the contributions of Crete and Greece to New Zealand during World War II, particularly in battles involving New Zealand and German forces in Chania. To commemorate this relationship, an olive tree was planted at Wellington's Michael Fowler Centre. Wellington observes "Chania Day" on 21 May. Chania's mayor visited Wellington in 2004.

== Friendship city ==
The official portal of the Wellington City Council provides the following definition of a friendly city relationship:

A friendly city relationship is less formal than a sister city relationship and it generally has a lower profile. It is likely to be a long term relationship, but the level of community support and involvement is not as high as with a full sister city relationship.

=== Sydney ===
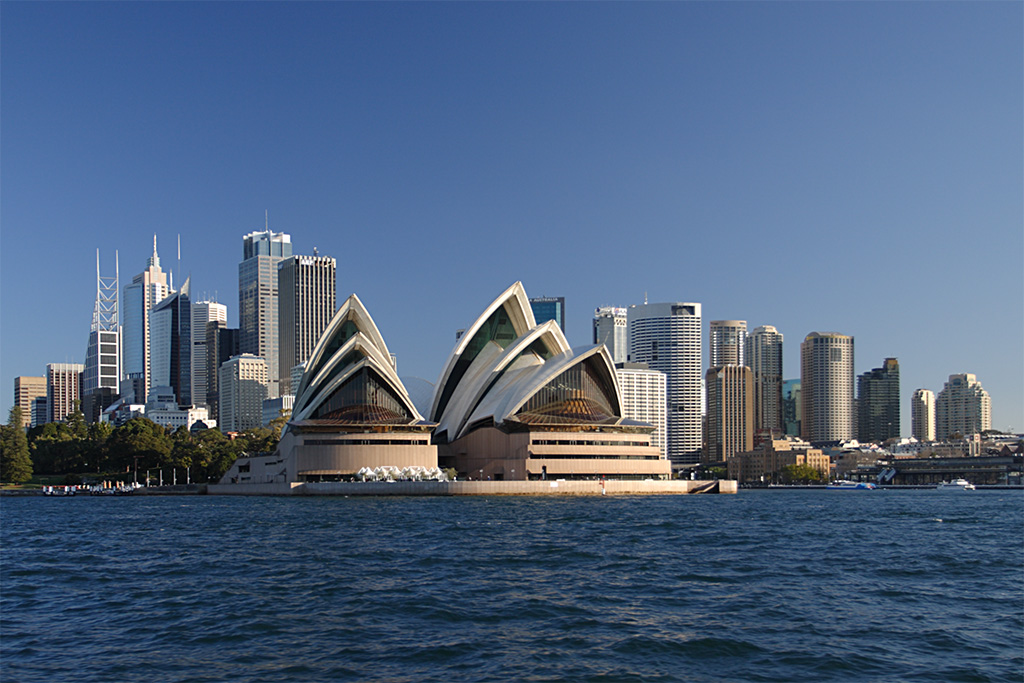
Sydney Opera House and skyline

Wellington and Sydney established an informal partnership in 1983, initiated by a visit from Wellington's then-mayor, Ian Lawrence. The collaboration focuses on trade and business support.

=== Ramallah ===
Wellington and Ramallah established a formal partnership with a friendly city agreement on 6 August 2025, following the Wellington City Council's vote in 2023 to initiate a friendly city relationship with Ramallah. Wellington mayor Tory Whanau and Ramallah mayor Issa Kassis first met online in April 2024.

== 2006 conference ==
In 2006, the Sister Cities New Zealand 25th Anniversary Conference celebrated 25 years of the organization facilitating Wellington's sister city agreements. The event also marked 25 years of partnerships with China and 50 years of global sister city relationships.

Participants included:

- Representatives from Wellington's sister cities, including Tianjin's mayor
- Chinese diplomats and trade representatives
- Wellington's mayor and city council
- Residents of Wellington's sister cities
- Asian trade and business organizations

The conference featured presentations, interactive projects, and speeches addressing:

- The potential of international partnerships
- Societal benefits of sister city relationships
- Opportunities for business sector support
- Promoting cultural and racial tolerance
