= 2001 Wellington mayoral election =

New Zealand local election

- 13 October 2001
- Turnout: 58,642 (47.78%)
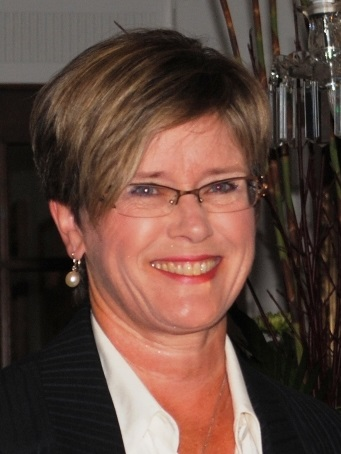

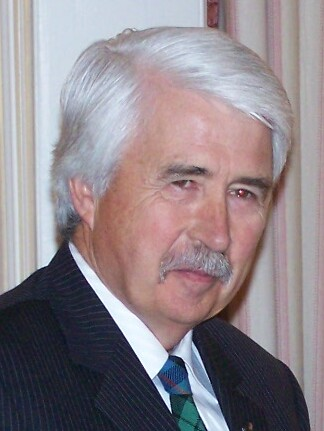
Candidate	Kerry Prendergast	Mary Varnham	John Morrison
Party	Independent	Independent	Independent
Popular vote	19,782	11,097	10,289
Percentage	33.73%	18.92%	17.54%
- Candidate performance by ward
Mayor before election
Mark Blumsky
Elected mayor
Kerry Prendergast

The 2001 Wellington mayoral election was part of the 2001 New Zealand local elections held at that time. Elections were held for the Mayor of Wellington plus other local government roles. Kerry Prendergast, the former deputy mayor, was elected as mayor of Wellington replacing Mark Blumsky who had retired. This was the last Wellington mayoral election that used the first-past-the-post method.

== Results ==
2001 Wellington mayoral election
Party	Candidate	Votes	%	±%
Independent	Kerry Prendergast	19,782	33.73	
Independent	Mary Varnham (Note: Endorsed by the Greens)	11,097	18.92	
Independent	John Morrison	10,289	17.54	
Independent	Andy Foster	3,982	6.79	
Alliance	Stephanie Cook	3,648	6.22	−16.24
Independent	Merepeka Raukawa-Tait	3,174	5.41	
Independent	Rob Goulden	1,827	3.11	
Independent	Bryan Pepperell	1,714	2.92	−9.95
Independent	Ollie Tafua	745	1.27	
Independent	Kent Clark	693	1.18	
Independent	Lindsay Milkop	290	0.49	
Independent	Josie Bullock	259	0.44	
Independent	Hugh Baker-Boyd	134	0.22	−2.16
Independent	Thomas Morgan	134	0.22	
Informal votes		874	1.49	
Majority		8,685	14.81	
Turnout		58,642	47.78	−0.68
Registered electors		122,730		

== Ward results ==
Candidates were also elected from wards to the Wellington City Council.

Party/ticket	Councillors
Independent	11
Three for North	3
Labour	2
Greens	1
Alliance	1
Independent Citizens	1
