= Blumsky =

Blumsky is a surname. Notable people with the surname include:

- John Blumsky (1928–2013), New Zealand journalist
- Mark Blumsky (born 1957), New Zealand politician and diplomat, son of John
