= Mary Varnham =

New Zealand writer and publisher

Mary Varnham (born 1946) is a New Zealand writer and publisher. She was a Wellington City Councillor from 1998 to 2001.

== Biography ==
Varnham was raised in Paekākāriki until she was 8 years old, when her family moved to Wellington. She attended Paekākāriki School, Hataitai School, Wellington East Girls College and Woodford House. She studied a Bachelor of Arts degree majoring in English and political science at the University of Otago, graduating in 1969. From 1972 to 1978, she lived in New York City, where she worked as a writer, public relations consultant, and book publicist at Simon & Schuster.

After returning to New Zealand, she worked at National Business Review and Network Communications. In 1983, she joined the New Zealand Labour Party’s parliamentary research unit and in 1984, she became a ministerial press secretary for Ann Hercus in David Lange's Labour Government.

From 1998 to 2001, Varnham was a Wellington City Councillor. In 2001 she stood for Mayor of Wellington, but was unsuccessful, finishing second behind deputy mayor Kerry Prendergast.

In 2003, Varnham established Awa Press, a publishing company focusing on non-fiction works by New Zealand and overseas writers. She edited Peter Adds' book The Transit of Venus, which was shortlisted for the Montana New Zealand Book Awards in the Reference & Anthology Category in 2008.

== Publications ==
- Varnham, M., & Woodford House (Havelock North, N.Z.). (1994). Beyond blue hills: One hundred years of Woodford House. Havelock North, N.Z: Woodford House.
- Kedgley, S. J., & Varnham, M. (1993). Heading nowhere in a navy blue suit: And other tales from the feminist revolution. Wellington, N.Z: Daphne Brasell Associates Press.
- Varnham, M. (1979). Bhutan: Himalayan Kingdom. Thimphu: Royal Government of the Kingdom of Bhutan.

== Personal life ==
Varnham married Paul O'Regan, a solicitor, in 1986.
