= 2013 Wellington mayoral election =

New Zealand local election

- 12 October 2013
- Turnout: 25,931 (40.85%)
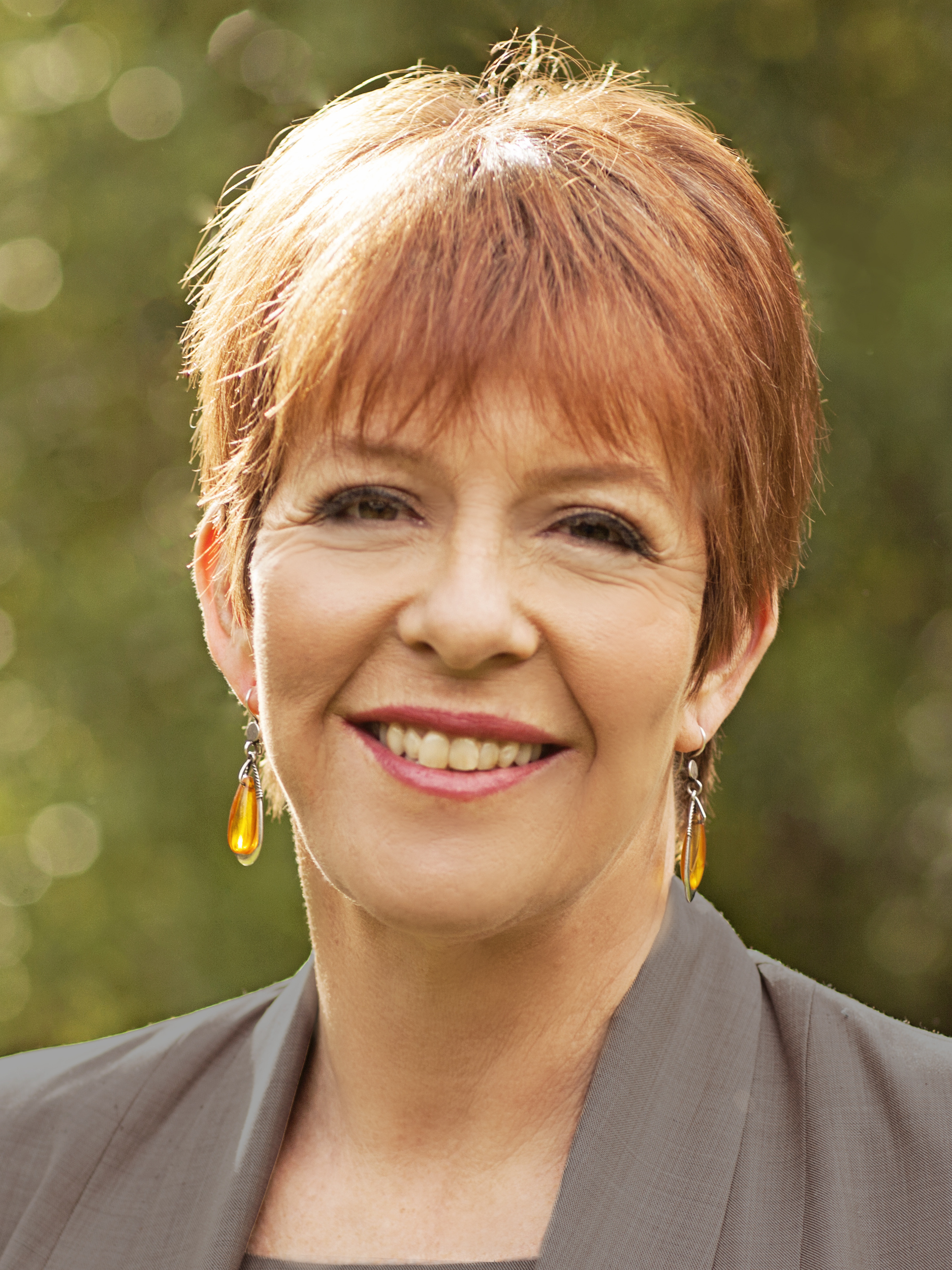

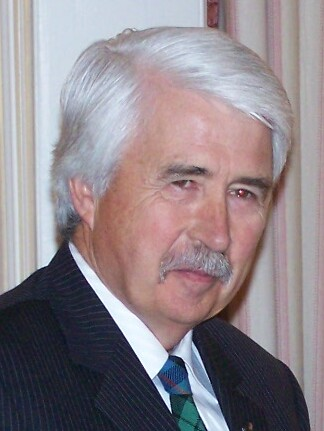

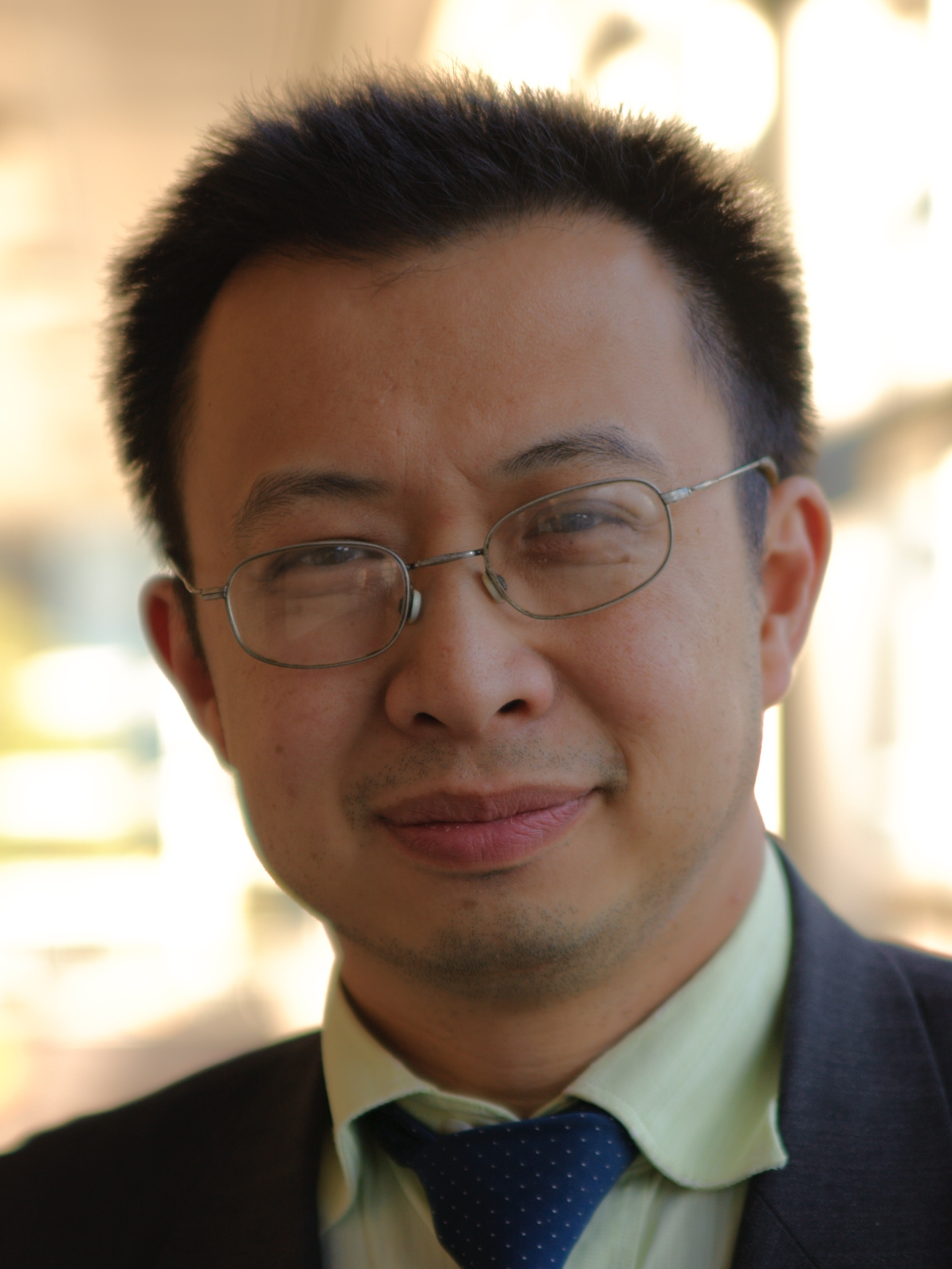
Candidate	Celia Wade-Brown	John Morrison	Jack Yan
Party	Independent	Independent	Independent
Popular vote	27,171	24,691	9,996
Percentage	52.39 (Last iteration)	47.61 (Last iteration)
Mayor before election
Celia Wade-Brown
Elected mayor
Celia Wade-Brown

The 2013 Wellington mayoral election was part of the New Zealand local elections. On 12 October 2013, elections were held for the Mayor of Wellington plus other local government roles. Celia Wade-Brown was re-elected.

At the time, Wellington was one of eight local bodies in New Zealand that used the Single transferable vote system to elect its mayor and councillors. The 2013 local government election was the first time that the Greater Wellington Regional Council used STV in it elections, and the first time a regional council used STV for elections in New Zealand.

== Candidates ==
When nominations closed there were six candidates for the Wellington mayoralty.

Name	Photo	Affiliation	Description
Rob Goulden		Independent	An Eastern Ward councillor from 1998 to 2010, Goulden himself forward for the mayoralty and for the Eastern Ward. He had previously stood for the mayoralty in 2004. He said that he wanted to "tackle council debt". A news item commented that he "will enliven Wellington mayoral race" as "he was voted out in 2010, after years of turbulent relationships with his fellow councillors".
John Morrison		Independent	A former cricketer and city councillor for the Onslow-Western ward since 1998. The main centre-right candidate to challenge Wade-Brown.
Karuna Muthu		Independent	A barrister and entrepreneur, entered the Wellington mayoral race just before nominations closed. A former chairman of the New Zealand National Party Rongotai electorate, and a past parliamentary candidate for the United Future Party in the 2008 general election.
Celia Wade-Brown		Independent	The incumbent mayor since 2010, she has served as a Southern Ward councillor from 1994 to 1998 and 2001 to 2010. She stood for the Green Party for parliament in 1996 (under the Alliance banner), 1999 and 2002.
Jack Yan		Independent	Stood for the mayoralty in 2010; in 2008 stood for the Alliance Party as a list candidate.
Nicola Young		Independent	In 2005 stood in the Rongotai electorate for the National Party. Her father was the former cabinet minister Bill Young, and she is the sister of former National list MP Annabel Young.

Withdrew

Dr Keith Johnson, an economist from Island Bay who ran as a Labour Party candidate for the Southern Ward in 2010, initially proposed to stand. He subsequently withdrew, saying that There was not much resonance in the concerns I had for debt control and against the rebalancing of rates.

== Results ==
Wade-Brown was re-elected. The following table shows preliminary results for first preference votes, and final results for the last iteration.

2013 Wellington City mayoral election
Party	Candidate	FPv%	Count				
Party	Candidate	FPv%	1	2	3	4	5
Independent	Celia Wade-Brown	37.61	21,259	21,449	22,021	23,228	27,171
Independent	John Morrison	33.44	18,904	19,064	19,769	21,433	24,691
Independent	Jack Yan	14.33	8,105	8,346	8,782	9,996	
Independent	Nicola Young	7.99	4,520	4,612	5,108		
Independent	Rob Goulden	4.47	2,531	2,607			
Independent	Karuna Muthu	1.65	935				
Electorate: Valid: 56,524 Spoilt: 71 Quota: 25,931 Turnout: 40.85%

== Ward results ==
Candidates were also elected from wards to the Wellington City Council.

Party/ticket	Councillors
Independent	9
Greens	3
Labour	2
