= 2007 Wellington mayoral election =

New Zealand local election

- 13 October 2007
- Turnout: 51,328 (39.76%)
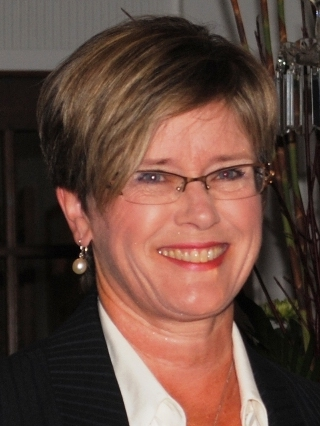

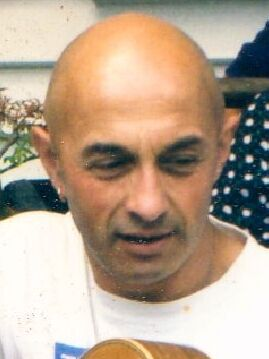

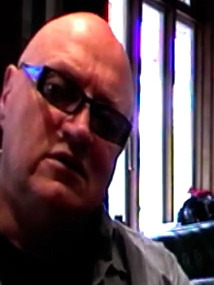
Candidate	Kerry Prendergast	Ray Ahipene-Mercer	Bryan Pepperell
Party	Independent	Independent	Independent
Popular vote	21,868	10,899	10,125
Percentage	50.98%	25.41%	23.61%
Mayor before election
Kerry Prendergast
Elected mayor
Kerry Prendergast

The 2007 Wellington mayoral election was part of the 2007 New Zealand local elections. On 13 October 2007, elections were held for the Mayor of Wellington plus other local government roles. Kerry Prendergast was elected for a third consecutive term as mayor of Wellington.

== Candidates ==
There were eleven candidates in the election:

- Ray Ahipene-Mercer, Councillor for the Eastern Ward since 2000
- Paul Bailey, a strategic marketing business consultant
- Carl Gifford, an artist and stonemason
- Rob Goulden, Councillor for the Eastern Ward since 1998
- Nick Kelly, a bus driver, trade unionist and former chairperson of the Rimutaka electorate committee of the Labour Party stood for the Workers Party
- John McGrath, a local restaurateur
- Bryan Pepperell, Councillor for the Southern Ward since 1996
- Kerry Prendergast, Incumbent Mayor since 2001
- Helene Ritchie, Councillor for the Northern Ward since 1998
- Jack Ruben, former city councillor
- Nick Wang, a journalist and the editor of the Capital Chinese News

== Campaign ==
McGrath's campaign was filled with controversies. During the campaign he used an image of Auckland Mayor Dick Hubbard on a billboard without permission and was forced to admit he owed up to $40,000 from the launch of his bar which he later sold. His campaign manager resigned, claiming he owed her money. After the election he failed to file his candidate spending figures, blaming it on his accountant.

== Results ==
The following table shows detailed results:

2007 Wellington City mayoral election
Party	Candidate	FPv%	Count								
Party	Candidate	FPv%	1	2	3	4	5	6	7	8	9
Independent	Kerry Prendergast	34.89	17,910	18,008	18,110	18,327	18,521	19,274	19,925	20,516	21,868
Independent	Ray Ahipene-Mercer	13.55	6,954	7,065	7,168	7,360	7,642	8,003	8,632	9,389	10,899
Independent	Bryan Pepperell	11.07	5,680	5,752	5,861	5,966	6,187	6,458	7,070	8,335	10,125
Independent	Helene Ritchie	10.83	5,559	5,633	5,755	5,865	6,050	6,346	6,754	7,643	
Independent	Jack Ruben	7.66	3,930	3,996	4,076	4,228	4,424	4,723	5,348		
Independent	Rob Goulden	6.21	3,187	3,241	3,299	3,515	3,708	4,213			
Independent	John McGrath	6.05	3,106	3,155	3,188	3,344	3,473				
Independent	Carl Gifford	3.37	1,730	1,779	1,901	2,015					
Independent	Paul Bailey	2.95	1,512	1,546	1,584						
Workers Party	Nick Kelly	1.82	932	988							
Independent	Nick Wang	1.63	838								
Electorate: 132,051 Valid: 51,328 Spoilt: 218 Quota: 21446 Turnout: 39.76

== Ward results ==
Candidates were also elected from wards to the Wellington City Council.

Party/ticket	Councillors
Independent	11
Greens	2
Labour	1
