= 1998 Wellington mayoral election =

New Zealand local election

- 10 October 1998
- Turnout: 57,512 (48.46%)
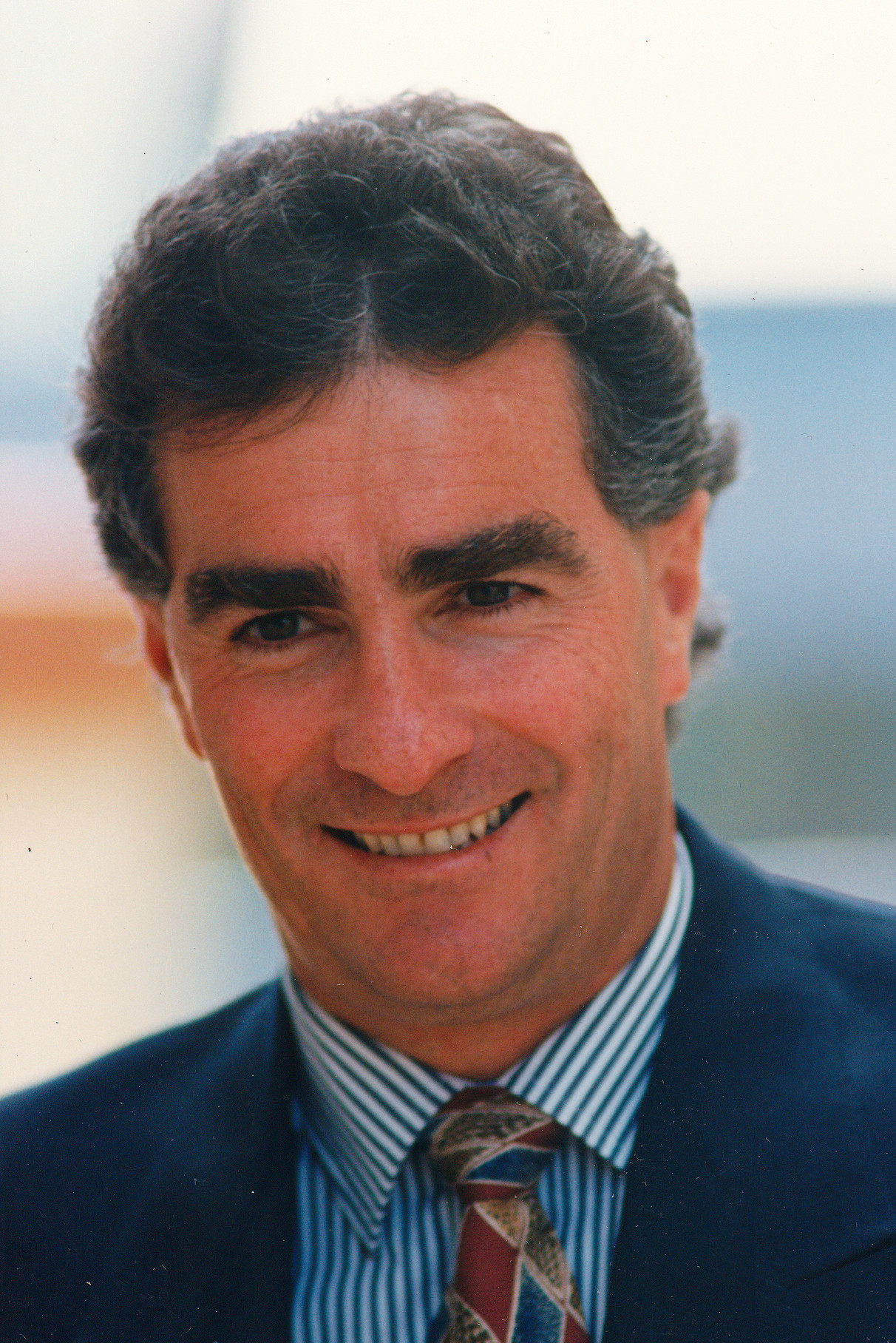

Candidate	Mark Blumsky	Stephanie Cook	Bryan Pepperell
Party	Wellington Alive	Alliance	Public Interest
Popular vote	33,828	12,918	7,402
Percentage	58.81	22.46	12.87
Mayor before election
Mark Blumsky
Independent
Elected mayor
Mark Blumsky
Wellington Alive

The 1998 Wellington mayoral election was part of the New Zealand local elections held that same year. In 1998, elections were held for the Mayor of Wellington plus other local government positions including 18 councillors. The polling was conducted using the standard first-past-the-post electoral method.

== Background ==
The election saw incumbent Mayor Mark Blumsky re-elected with a greatly increased majority. However Blumsky did not gain a majority of support on the council with only seven of the "Wellington Alive" ticket elected. Wellington Alive were selection of right-leaning council candidates led by Blumsky following the dissolution of the decades old Citizens' Association several years earlier.

Councillor Jack Ruben initially declared to stand, but withdrew to support Stephanie Cook and avoid further splitting the left-wing vote. Bryan Pepperell, another left leaning candidate stood as well. Cook and Pepperell were re-elected to the council, though Ruben lost his seat.

The 1998 election is the last mayoral election in Wellington's history to date where the successful candidate polled more than half the popular vote. It was also the first time since the 1933 election that the Labour Party did not field a mayoral candidate.

== Mayoralty results ==
The following table gives the election results:

1998 Wellington mayoral election
Party	Candidate	Votes	%	±%
Wellington Alive	Mark Blumsky	33,828	58.81	+14.82
Alliance	Stephanie Cook	12,918	22.46	
For The Public Interest	Bryan Pepperell	7,402	12.87	+11.25
no affiliation	Rama Ramanathan	1,381	2.40	
Independent	Hugh Baker-Boyd	1,374	2.38	
Tumeke	Robert Te Whare	609	1.05	
Majority		20,910	36.35	+11.84
Turnout		57,512	48.46	−4.64
Registered electors		118,669		

== Ward results ==
Candidates were also elected from wards to the Wellington City Council.

Party/ticket	Councillors
Wellington Alive	7
Labour	3
For the Public Interest	1
Greens	1
Alliance	1
Independent	5
