= Jack Yan =

New Zealand publisher, designer and businessman

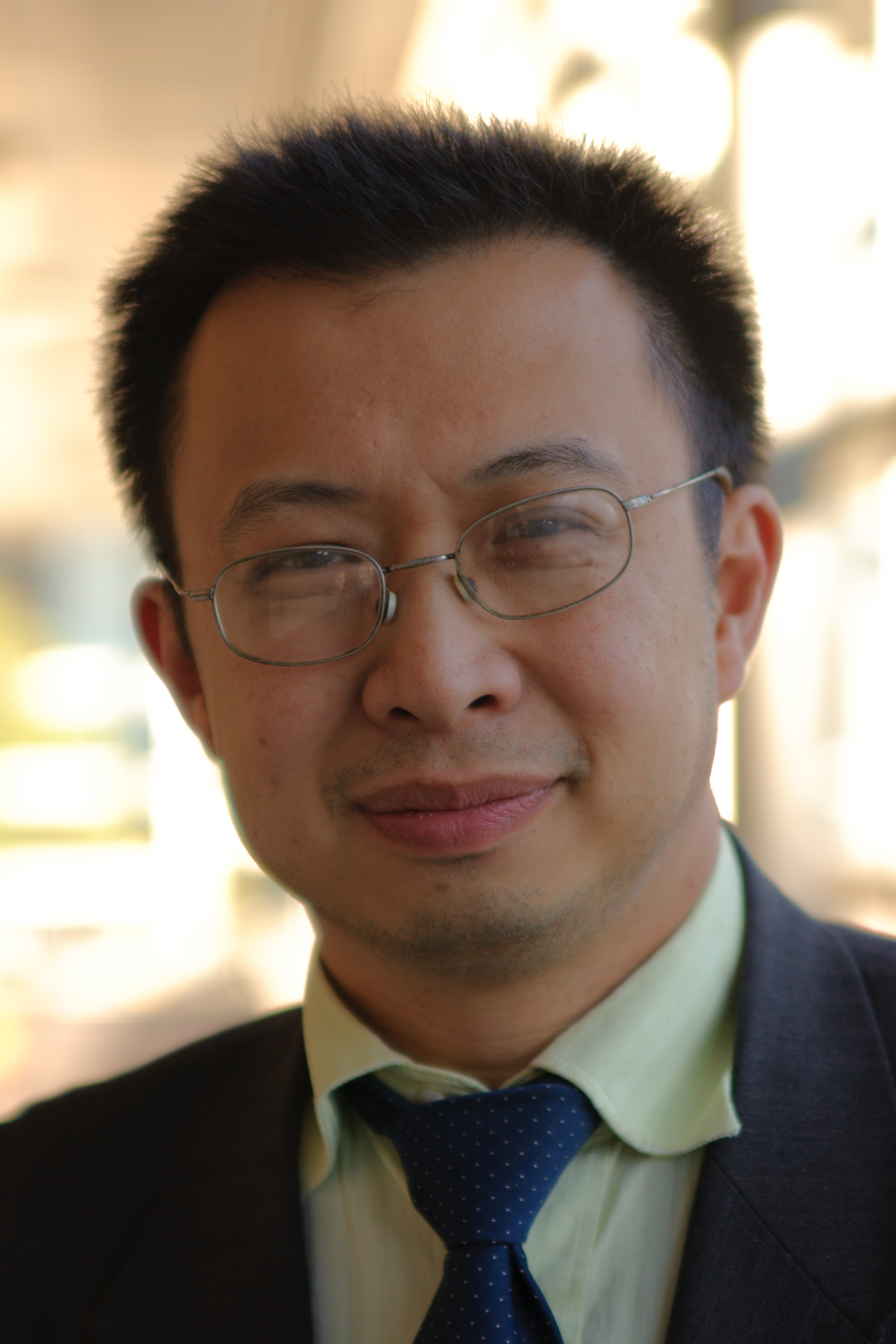
- Born: 1972 (age 53–54); Kowloon, British Hong Kong
- Occupations: Publisher, designer, businessman
- Political party: Alliance (2008)
- Website: https://jackyan.com/

Jack Yan (Chinese: 甄爵恩; pinyin: Zhēn Jué'ēn; born 1972) is a New Zealand publisher, designer and businessman. He is best known as the founder and publisher of Lucire.

He ran for mayor of Wellington in 2010, and again in 2013, but was unsuccessful in both elections.

== Background ==
Yan was born in Kowloon, Hong Kong, and emigrated to Wellington, New Zealand, with his parents in 1976. He attended St Mark's Church School (where he was Dux) and Scots College, and graduated from Victoria University of Wellington with three degrees – two in business and one in law.

Aside from English, Yan speaks Cantonese, French, and Taishanese.

== Career ==
=== Business ventures ===
Beginning in the 1980s, Yan created over 100 typeface designs himself for his firm, Jack Yan & Associates and was New Zealand's first digital typeface designer. He encouraged other local typeface designers such as Kris Sowersby to pursue careers in that industry. His typefaces include Ætna, a revival of Bembo.

He also helms a consulting firm, and is co-chair of the Medinge Group think-tank.

In 1997, he founded Lucire, a fashion magazine that added print editions after starting on the web, and serves as its publisher.

From 2007 to 2012, he was a judge for Miss Universe New Zealand, and became a director of the licensee firm that took over in 2013.

In 2008, he founded the online car encyclopedia Autocade, which he then extended into a print version in 2023.

=== Writings and media ===
Yan was a contributor to Visual Arts Trends in New York (1999–2001), The Journal of Brand Management in London (2003–11), and Desktop magazine in Australia (1996–2010).

Web publications that he has written for include UK-based Fontzone and DZ3. He was a founding contributor to Allaboutbranding.com (from 2002). Additionally, he writes for his own publications, CAP and Lucire.

He contributed chapters to Beyond Branding (2003) and Brands with a Conscience (2016), wrote Typography and Branding (2004), and ghost-wrote Greek designer Panos Papadopoulos's autobiography, Panos: My Life, My Odyssey (2022), for which they won a Highly Commended at the Business Book Awards 2023. He followed that up with the biographical Lilla boken om Panos: historien om den ikoniska badmodedesignern (2024) in Sweden.

From 3 March 2006, he began a weekly spot on TV One's Good Morning, discussing men's issues, but resigned from that role in 2007.

In 2020, he started as a regular panellist on Radio New Zealand's The Panel.

He is better known outside New Zealand for his work; he has been interviewed by CNN, Business 2.0 and the UK's The Daily Telegraph.

=== Politics ===
In the 2008 general election Yan stood as a candidate on the Alliance party list, but no candidates for the Alliance were elected. He was a candidate in Wellington's 2010 mayoral election, and stood again in the 2013 elections.

== Books ==
- Beyond Branding: How the New Values of Transparency and Integrity Are Changing the World of Brands, with Nicholas Ind (editor), Malcolm Allan, Simon Anholt, Julie Anixter, John Caswell, Thomas Gad, Sicco van Gelder, Tim Kitchin, Chris Macrae, Denzil Meyers, Alan Mitchell, John Moore, Ian Ryder; 2003, 2004 reprint edition, Kogan Page, ISBN 0-7494-4115-1; 2005 paperback edition, Kogan Page, ISBN 0-7494-4399-5.
- Viewpoint: Perspectives on 21st Century Branding: User Seductive; 2004, Wai-te-ata Press.
- Typography and Branding; 2004, Natcoll Publishing.
- Brands with a Conscience: How to Build a Successful and Responsible Brand, with Nicholas Ind (editor), Malcolm Allan, Enric Bernal, Peter Brown, Giuseppe Cavallo, Thomas Gad, Ava Hakim, Sudhir John Horo, Oriol Iglesias, Philippe Mihailovich, Simon Paterson, Annette Rosencreutz, Cristián Saracco, Nikolaj Stagis, Brigitte Stepputtis, and Erika Uffindell; 2016, Kogan Page, ISBN 0-7494-7544-7.
- Panos: My Life, My Odyssey, with Panos Papadopoulos; 2022, LID Publishing, ISBN 978-1-911687-12-2.
- Autocade Yearbook 2024, 2023, JY&A Media, ISSN 3021-159X.
- Lilla boken om Panos: historien om den ikoniska badmodedesignern, with Panos Papadopoulos; 2024, Tukan förlag, ISBN 978-9-180385-83-1.
- Autocade Year of Cars 2025, 2024, JY&A Media, ISSN 3021-159X.
- Autocade Year of Cars 2026, 2025, JY&A Media, ISSN 3021-159X.
