= John Morrison (cricketer) =

New Zealand cricketer

John Morrison MNZM
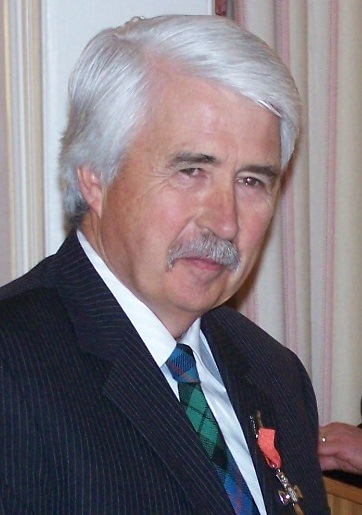

Personal information
- Full name: John Francis MacLean Morrison
- Born: 27 August 1947 (age 79); Wellington, New Zealand
- Nickname: Mystery
- Batting: Right-handed
- Bowling: Slow left-arm orthodox
- Role: Batsman

International information
- National side: New Zealand (1973–1983)
- Test debut (cap 128): 29 December 1973 v Australia
- Last Test: 19 March 1982 v Australia
- ODI debut (cap 20): 9 March 1975 v England
- Last ODI: 17 March 1983 v Australia

Domestic team information
- Years: Team
- 1965/66–1966/67: Central Districts
- 1967/68–1983/84: Wellington

Career statistics
Competition	Test	ODI	FC	LA
Matches	17	18	126	54
Runs scored	656	252	6,142	1,312
Batting average	22.62	21.00	30.71	31.23
100s/50s	1/3	0/1	7/32	0/10
Top score	117	55	180*	89
Balls bowled	264	283	4,407	576
Wickets	2	8	51	12
Bowling average	35.50	24.87	31.50	34.75
5 wickets in innings	0	0	1	0
10 wickets in match	0	0	0	0
Best bowling	2/52	3/24	5/69	3/24
Catches/stumpings	9/–	6/–	133/–	21/–
- Source: Cricinfo, 3 December 2016

John Francis Maclean Morrison MNZM (born 27 August 1947) is a former New Zealand cricketer who played 17 Test matches and 18 One Day Internationals for New Zealand. From 1998 to 2013, he was a Wellington City Councillor; his political career ended when he stood for mayor in 2013.

== Cricket career ==
A dogged right-handed opening batsman who was born at Wellington in 1947, Morrison was also known for his occasional left-arm spin bowling, including his 'mystery' delivery. After several seasons of moderate performances in domestic cricket he hit 180 not out (which remained his highest first-class score) for Wellington against Northern Districts at Wellington in 1972–73, and was selected for the next season's tour of Australia. In the three-Test series he was the leading run-scorer on either side, with 249 at an average of 41.50. He hit 117, his only Test century, in the Second Test at Sydney. He never regained that Test form, although he did enough to be selected in the International Wanderers XI tour of South Africa in 1975–76.

His best first-class bowling came for Wellington against Auckland at Auckland in 1977–78, when he took 5 for 69 in Auckland's second innings and followed up with 106 to lead a run chase which ended with Wellington losing by four runs.

== Local-body politics ==
Since retiring from playing, Morrison has worked as a commentator and in local politics, including serving on the Wellington City Council for the Western Ward since 1998. As councilor, Morrison worked to bring an Aussie Rules match to Wellington. A match was held on Anzac Day 2013 between St Kilda and the Sydney Swans. Shortly afterwards Morrison and businessman John Dow brokered a deal with Australian firm CallActive to bring "300 to 500" call-centre jobs to Wellington.

In May 2013, Morrison announced his candidacy for the Wellington mayoralty at the 2013 local elections. He was unsuccessful in challenging incumbent mayor Celia Wade-Brown, meaning that he was no longer on Wellington City Council, as he had contested the mayoralty only.

In July 2019, a new centre-right political party, the Wellington Party, announced candidates for the 2019 local government elections would include Morrison. However, he did not appear on the final list of candidates.

== Other roles ==
After finishing as a Wellington City Councillor in 2013, Morrison took on a role as CallActive's business development manager but left before the centre went into liquidation in 2015.

== Honours and awards ==
In the 2009 Queen's Birthday Honours, Morrison was appointed a Member of the New Zealand Order of Merit, for services to cricket and the community.
