= John Bryan (diplomat) =

New Zealand diplomat

High Commissioner of New Zealand to the Cook Islands
- In office August 2005 – late February 2008
- Preceded by: Kurt Meyer
- Succeeded by: Brian Donnelly

High Commissioner of New Zealand to Niue
- Incumbent
- Assumed office May 2000
- Preceded by: Michael Pointer

John Bryan is a New Zealand career diplomat who served as High Commissioner of New Zealand to Niue and later as High Commissioner to the Cook Islands.

== Career ==
=== High Commissioner to Niue ===
In February 2000, New Zealand Foreign Affairs Minister Phil Goff announced Bryan as New Zealand's next High Commissioner to Niue, with the posting to begin in May 2000, replacing Michael Pointer. At the time, he had served in postings including Apia, Suva, Singapore, Bonn, and New York City, and had most recently been Consul-General in Brisbane.

In September 2010, Bryan was succeeded as acting High Commissioner to Niue by the appointment of former Wellington Mayor Mark Blumsky to the post.

=== High Commissioner to the Cook Islands ===
In May 2005, Goff appointed Bryan as New Zealand's next High Commissioner to the Cook Islands, to replace Kurt Meyer in August 2005.

In February 2008, Winston Peters announced that former Member of Parliament Brian Donnelly would take up the Cook Islands posting in late February, replacing Bryan, who had retired.
