= Celia Wade-Brown =

New Zealand politician

Celia Wade-Brown QSO MP
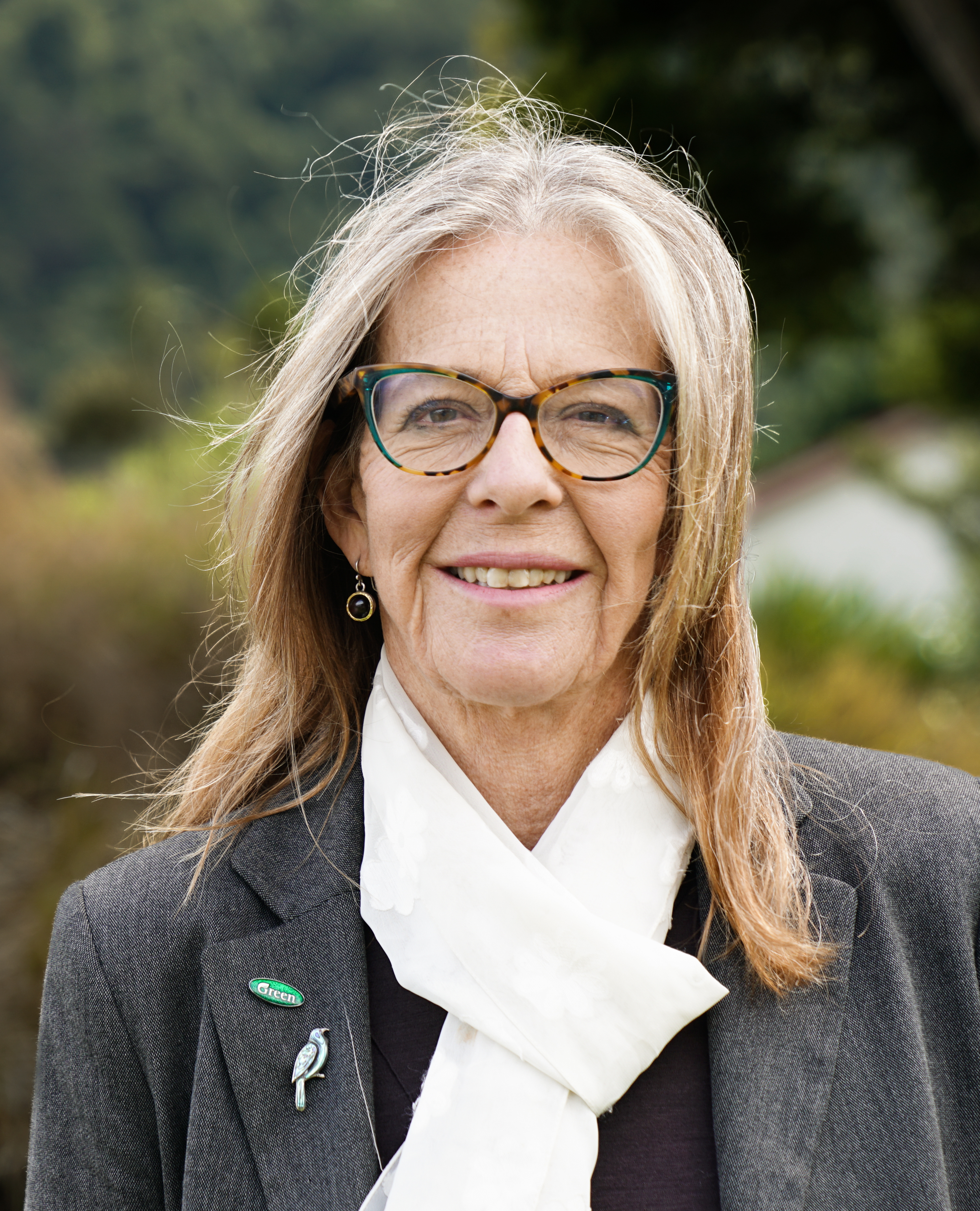
- Wade-Brown in 2023

Member of the New Zealand Parliament for Green party list
- Incumbent
- Assumed office 19 January 2024
- Preceded by: Golriz Ghahraman

34th Mayor of Wellington
- In office 27 October 2010 – 10 October 2016
- Deputy: Ian McKinnon (2010–13); Justin Lester (2013–16)
- Preceded by: Kerry Prendergast
- Succeeded by: Justin Lester

Member of the Wellington City Council for the Southern Ward
- In office 13 October 2001 – 27 October 2010
- Preceded by: Alick Shaw
- Succeeded by: Paul Eagle
- In office 30 April 1994 – 10 October 1998
- Preceded by: Merrin Downing
- Succeeded by: Alick Shaw

Personal details
- Born: 12 July 1956 (age 70) Paddington, London, England
- Party: Green
- Other political affiliations: Alliance (1991–1997)
- Spouse: Alastair Nicholson (m. 1993)
- Children: Two
- Wade-Brown's voice recorded July 2024

Celia Margaret Wade-Brown QSO MP (born 12 July 1956) is a New Zealand politician who has been a Green Party list MP since 19 January 2024. She previously served as the 34th mayor of Wellington, the capital city of New Zealand, from 2010 until 2016.

Wade-Brown was the third female mayor of the city, replacing centre-right Kerry Prendergast. She defeated Prendergast by 176 votes in the 2010 single transferable vote mayoral election. Wade-Brown won a second term in 2013. She was the second mayor of a major New Zealand city to have been a member of the Green Party, after Dunedin's Sukhi Turner, but she stood as an independent candidate. Wade-Brown did not contest the Wellington mayoralty in the 2016 local election for a third term.

== Early life ==
Born in Paddington, West London, to British military officer father Paul Wade-Brown, Wade-Brown grew up in a council flat. She attended The Holt School in Wokingham, Berkshire, England. After school, she took a gap year in Cape Coast, Ghana, then earned an honours degree in philosophy from the University of Nottingham. She started her professional life with IBM in the United Kingdom, and moved to Wellington in 1983.

As an adult, Wade-Brown discovered and connected with two half-sisters. One half-sister, Gitta Rupp, was an Austrian war child born to her father and an Austrian mother.

== Local government career ==
Wade-Brown served two periods as a Wellington City Councillor for the Southern ward, first in 1994–1998 and 2001–2010.

=== Mayor of Wellington ===
In 2010 Wade-Brown decided to run for Mayor of Wellington instead of standing again in her council seat in Wellington's Southern ward. Wade-Brown beat the incumbent mayor, Kerry Prendergast, by 176 votes. Some media outlets reported that this was the closest margin ever seen in the Wellington mayoral race. In total, Wade-Brown received 24,881 votes, compared to Prendergast's 24,705 votes.

Paul Eagle replaced Wade-Brown as a Councillor for the Southern ward.

Wade-Brown did not favour Wellington's adopting a 'super city' type council like Auckland, though she supported reducing the number of councils in greater Wellington from nine to "three or four".

Wade-Brown was re-elected as Mayor of Wellington in October 2013, beating her main rival John Morrison 27,171 to 24,691 after five rounds of vote allocation.

Wade-Brown listed her priorities for the first 100 days as "the south coast cycle lanes, completing the draft annual plan before Christmas, agreeing on three-year priorities, taking first steps towards a living wage for council staff, slimming down council-owned companies and continuing to improve shared services with other councils". A basic form of the living wage was introduced in 2014, increasing salaries for over 500 council staff as well as people in the zoo, museums trust, security contractors, and cleaners.

In August 2014 Wade-Brown became an executive leader of Mayors for Peace. Peace Action Wellington criticised Wellington Venues' decision to host a 'War Conference' sponsored by Lockheed Martin in June 2015 because of her role as the executive leader of Mayors for Peace. A spokesperson for Peace Action Wellington said, "Her commitment to working for peace appears to be as shallow as her understanding of the role of weapons manufacturers in promoting war and militarism. In her response, the Mayor has equated the Weapons Conference with the likes of an international yoga meeting or a sustainable living expo."

Wade-Brown was criticised heavily for her involvement in the construction of a cycleway in the Wellington suburb of Island Bay. However, she increased the cycling budget from $70,000 p.a. when she was elected to $37 million over four years, including central government funding.

In 2016, the World Economic Forum recognised her as one of five ground-breaking female Mayors.

Under her leadership, Wellington maintained its rank as the 12th highest city for quality of life. In 2015, Vogue magazine described Wellington as the "coolest little city" and the BBC described Wellington as the "hottest little city".

Successful projects in partnership with central government included Pukeahu National Memorial Park, the Cenotaph precinct and WW100 commemorations. Other achievements included significant biodiversity increases with pest control and forest restoration. In 2013 Wellington became a Biophilic Cities partner.

Celia Wade-Brown was expected to run for reelection in 2016, but announced that she would not run for the mayoralty again. Justin Lester replaced Wade-Brown as Mayor of Wellington, winning the popular vote by more than 6000 votes over his rivals.

Wade-Brown moved permanently to the Mangatarere Valley outside Carterton in 2017 in a property she had owned with her husband since 1987.

== Member of Parliament ==
New Zealand Parliament
Years	Term	Electorate	List	Party
2024–present	54th	List	15	Green

After gaining profile as a Wellington City councillor, Wade-Brown stood for election to the New Zealand House of Representatives as a Green Party candidate three times, first as a list candidate (ranked 44th) under the Alliance banner in the 1996 election. In the 1999 election, while on a hiatus from her local government career, she stood for the Green Party as a list candidate (ranked 29th). In the 2002 election, she stood for the Green Party as a list candidate (ranked 15th) and ran in the Rongotai electorate where she placed third.

After a four-year hiatus from politics, Wade-Brown was selected as the Green Party's candidate for the Wairarapa general electorate seat at the 2020 election. She did not stand on the party list. At the 2023 election Wade-Brown contested Wairarapa for a second time and was 15th on the party list. She came fourth place in the electorate, winning 1,832 votes. The Green Party had its most successful result ever, but was one seat short of bringing Wade-Brown to Parliament.

Following Golriz Ghahraman's resignation announcement on 16 January 2024, Wade-Brown was declared elected a Member of Parliament from the Green Party list by the Electoral Commission on 19 January. In January 2026 she announced her intention to retire at that year's general election.

During her term as a Member of Parliament, Wade-Brown held party spokesperson roles in democracy and electoral reform, digitising government, local government, and tourism and hospitality, sitting as a member of the government administration committee. She was also associate spokesperson for conservation and campaigned for the compulsory microchipping and registration of cats.

On 28 January 2026, Wade-Brown announced she would not stand at the 2026 New Zealand general election.

== Community involvement ==
Wade-Brown was a founding member of the New Zealand Internet Society (now known as InternetNZ). InternetNZ is a non-profit organisation set up in 1995 dedicated to protecting and promoting the Internet in New Zealand. In 2002 Wade-Brown founded Living Streets Aotearoa, a walking-advocacy organisation with 15 branches. It holds collective membership of the International Federation of Pedestrians.

Wade-Brown is a Friend of Taputeranga Marine Reserve.

== Family ==
Wade-Brown is married to Alastair Nicholson and has two sons.

Political offices
Preceded by Kerry Prendergast	Mayor of Wellington; 2010–2016	Succeeded by Justin Lester
Preceded by Merrin Downing	Wellington City Councillor for Southern Ward; 1994–1998; 2001–2010	Succeeded by Alick Shaw
Preceded by Alick Shaw	Wellington City Councillor for Southern Ward; 1994–1998; 2001–2010	Succeeded by Paul Eagle
