= Panos Papadopoulos =

Greek–Swedish businessman

Panos Papadopoulos (born 1958 in Kertezi, Greece) is the founder, designer and entrepreneur behind Panos Emporio AB, established 1986 in Gothenburg, Sweden, the largest swimwear supplier in Scandinavia. He is known as the "King of Swimwear". He is also well known as the man who desired to change the face of beauty competitions when he purchased the Miss Sweden contest and changed the name to New Miss Sweden.

== Early life ==
The youngest of three siblings, Panagiotis Papadopoulos was born in Kertezi, Greece, and was nicknamed Panos from a young age. The family soon moved to the outskirts of Athens, where his parents worked at a metal foundry. The young Panos accompanied his mother when she worked as a cleaner at the foundry at the weekends, and was soon hired himself. As a teenager, he encountered corruption relating to labour violations, environmental pollution, and education. Frustrated with being unable to instigate change, he purchased an interrail ticket to see Europe, winding up in Gothenburg, Sweden. He decided to continue his university studies there, working in kitchens, on a cruise ship, as a teacher, rest home worker, and prison guard, among other professions.

== Panos Emporio ==
In 1986, Papadopoulos founded a swimwear label, Panos Emporio, after noticing that the market predominantly had dull colours. He was eventually able to sell them through Swedish retailers, and his colourful designs proved a hit. In 1991, he was able to secure Jannike Björling, the former partner of Björn Borg, as his model, catapulting his label into the media limelight.

In 1996, Papadopoulos launched the Paillot as part of the Panos Emporio range, a three-in-one women's swimsuit that remains part of its range today. The same year, Victoria Silvstedt succeeded Björling as Panos Emporio's model. Subsequent models included Janina Frostell, Traci Bingham, and Sofia Mattsson.

Between 1997 and 2002, Panos Emporio was the naming rights' sponsor of the football club Ljungskile SK. There was some additional interest in sponsoring in 2008.

In 2009, it did a nationwide search to see who would be the company's next model.

In 2014, its L'homme fragrance was nominated as the men's fragrance of the year under SEK 500 at that year's Swedish Beauty & Cosmetics Awards. In 2017, his second men's fragrance won the same nomination at that year's awards.

In 2016, Papadopoulos won a silver prize in the Swedish Design Awards for his men's swimming trunk design, Meander.

== Miss Sweden ==
Papadopoulos negotiated to buy the Miss Sweden pageant from Swedish network TV3 in 2004, retooling it (as "New Miss Sweden") and eliminating tiaras, sashes and the swimwear segment, with a relaunch in 2006. Josephine Alhanko was crowned its first winner that year. The final New Miss Sweden took place in 2009, after a falling out with Miss Universe: Papadopoulos claimed the licensor was "fearful of change" and they unilaterally ended the business relationship, despite being initially positive about the press he was getting.

== Other business ventures ==
In 2006, he bought 7.2% of the Swedish footwear retail chain Wedins, but soon sold his shares at a profit after the company declined to give him a seat on the board.

In 2021, he opened the Panos Panos Tavern in Gothenburg. It won two golds at the Authentic Greek Cuisine Awards 2023.
