= Mark Blumsky =

New Zealand politician

Mark Blumsky QSO
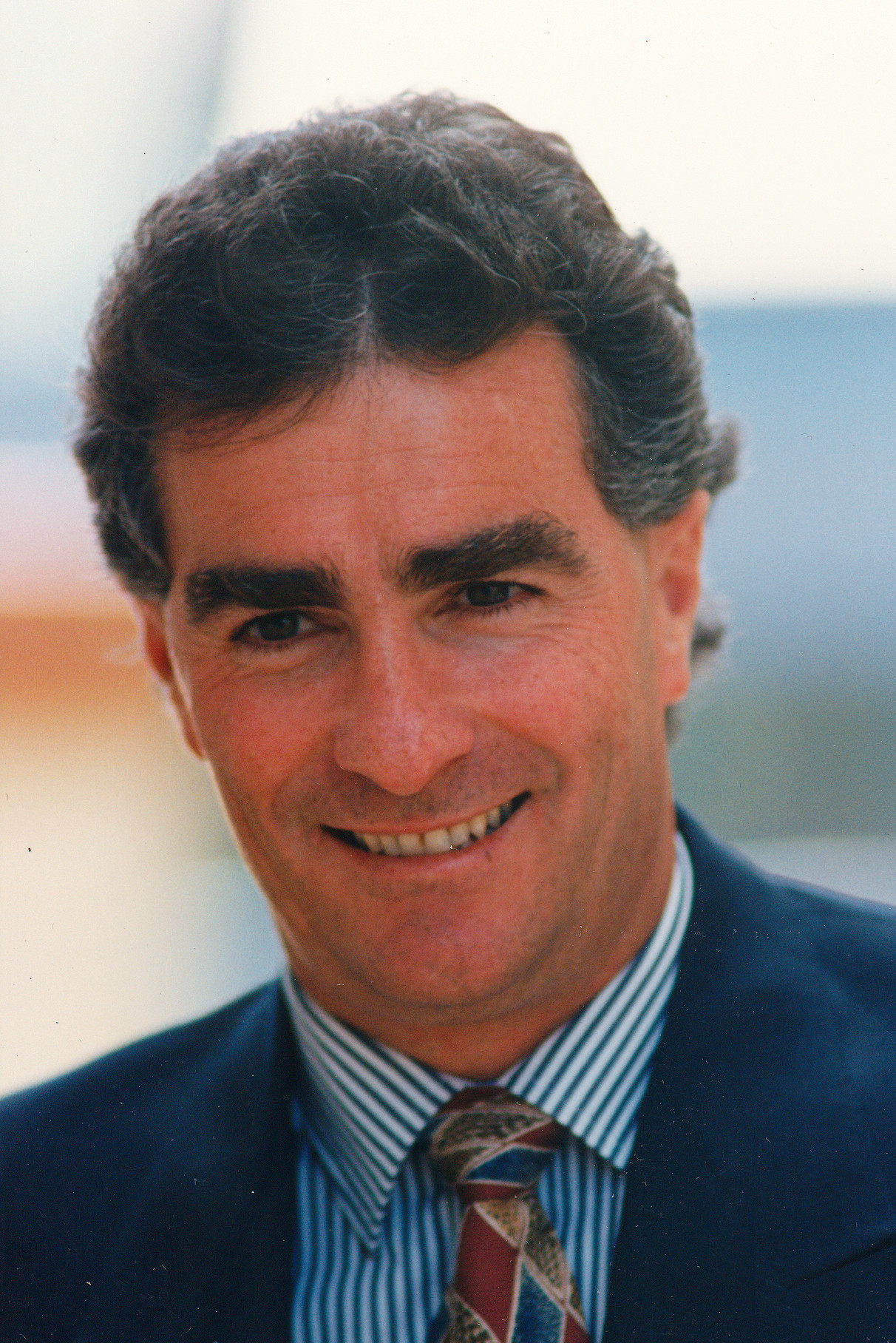
- Blumsky in 1996

32nd Mayor of Wellington
- In office 28 October 1995 – 27 October 2001
- Deputy: Kerry Prendergast
- Preceded by: Fran Wilde
- Succeeded by: Kerry Prendergast

Member of the New Zealand Parliament for National Party List
- In office 17 September 2005 – 8 November 2008

High Commissioner of New Zealand to Niue
- In office 2010–2014
- Preceded by: John Bryan
- Succeeded by: Ross Ardern

Personal details
- Born: 29 August 1957 (age 69) Nelson, New Zealand
- Party: National (2004–); United Future (2004)
- Relations: John Blumsky (father)

Mark Herbert Blumsky QSO (born 29 August 1957) is a former New Zealand politician and diplomat. He was mayor of Wellington from 1995 to 2001, and a member of parliament for the National Party from 2005 to 2008. Blumsky was New Zealand's high commissioner to Niue from 2010 to 2014.

== Early life and family ==
Blumsky was born in Nelson in 1957, the son of broadcaster and journalist John Blumsky, and educated at St Bede's College and Linwood College in Christchurch. Of Polish and Jewish origin, Blumsky started work at Hannah's Footwear Company in 1976 aged 17. He progressed from salesperson, to merchandise manager, to footwear buyer, to national sales manager. In 1989 he founded Mischief Shoes, which grew into a nationwide multimillion-dollar chain. In 1995 he left to enter politics.

== Mayor of Wellington ==
In mid-1995 Blumsky sought the nomination of the centre-right Citizens' Association electoral ticket for the mayoralty, but lost out to Nigel Gould, the former chairman of the Wellington Harbour Board. Blumsky was not dissuaded and immediately declared his candidacy for the mayoralty as an independent candidate. Blumsky was elected Mayor of Wellington in 1995 and re-elected in 1998. One of his main policies during the 1995 election campaign was that he would not allow the council to sell its remaining 51% share of Capital Power. However, during his first term in office Blumsky controversially agreed to sell the council's stake in the company, citing commercially sensitive information. The remainder of his mayoralty focused on building Wellington's image as an exciting and diverse city to visit and to live in. He was also the inaugural patron of the Wellington Gay Business group GAP. Among other things, he developed Totally Wellington (the regional tourism promoter), established the Wellington Regional Economic Development Agency, and established infrastructure for the film industry.

Financial problems at Mischief Shoes, subsequent to his entering politics, prompted questions from critics and the media about whether he was responsible.

He enjoyed living in an inner-city apartment because it enabled him to go out on the town in the evenings. A popular local tale was his battle with well-known Courtenay Place busker 'Kenny', a cowboy hat-wearing country music singer whose amplifier was confiscated by the council after the volume annoyed other city apartment-dwellers.

Blumsky retired in 2001 and endorsed then deputy mayor Kerry Prendergast as his successor. She went on to win the mayoralty in 2001 and was re-elected in 2004 and 2007.

== 2001–2005 ==
After leaving office, Blumsky returned to business life. From October 2001 to September 2002 he co-ordinated the highly successful Wellington premieres of the first two movies in Peter Jackson's The Lord of the Rings trilogy and managed the marketing of The Lord of the Rings collectibles for Weta Workshop. During the shooting of The Lord of the Rings: The Return of the King he took an active role, and was persuaded to throw the severed heads over a set wall onto a group of Knights. The results of this can be seen in the film during the buildup to the battle at Gondor.

In the 2002 Queen's Birthday and Golden Jubilee Honours, Blumsky was appointed a Companion of the Queen's Service Order for public services.

From September 2002 to July 2004 Blumsky was founding director of Creative HQ, a business incubator for high-growth export-oriented start-ups. From August 2004 to May 2005 he was director (sales and marketing) for Norsewear, an iconic New Zealand clothing company with a multimillion-dollar turnover.

== Member of Parliament ==
New Zealand Parliament
Years	Term	Electorate	List	Party
2005–2008	48th	List	36	National

In early 2004 Blumsky joined United Future at the urging of its leader Peter Dunne, an old school friend. Blumsky, dubbed by media the man with "the most charismatic eyebrows in politics", served as Party President and confirmed he was considering running for Parliament for the party. However, he resigned soon afterwards, citing a conflict of interest.

In October 2004, Blumsky announced that he would seek the National Party candidacy for the Wellington Central electorate, and was nominated unopposed in November. In June 2005 the National Party released its party list for the elections later that year and Blumsky was ranked 36.

His campaign was marred by an incident in which he received a black eye and other abrasions when returning home late at night. He said he did not recall the incident but believed he had been assaulted. Political opponents suggested he had been inebriated, and a witness reported that he was inebriated when she helped him to his door. Police investigated but no assailant was charged.

Blumksy was elected as a National list MP in the 2005 general election although his challenge to incumbent Wellington Central MP Marian Hobbs was unsuccessful, losing by 6,180 votes. In 2007, he announced that he would not stand again in the next election.

== Niue ==
In September 2010, Blumsky was appointed High Commissioner to Niue, replacing acting High Commissioner John Bryan. He was succeeded by Ross Ardern in February 2014.

Blumsky married a Niuean, Pauline Rex, in 2012 and now lives permanently on Niue. He represented Niue in lawn bowls at the 2018 Commonwealth Games, competing in the men's pairs and men's four, but did not progress beyond the group stage in either event.

Blumsky ran as a candidate in the 2020 Niuean general election but was unsuccessful.

Political offices
Preceded by Fran Wilde	Mayor of Wellington; 1995–2001	Succeeded by Kerry Prendergast
