= 2004 Wellington mayoral election =

New Zealand local election

- 9 October 2004
- Turnout: 52,067
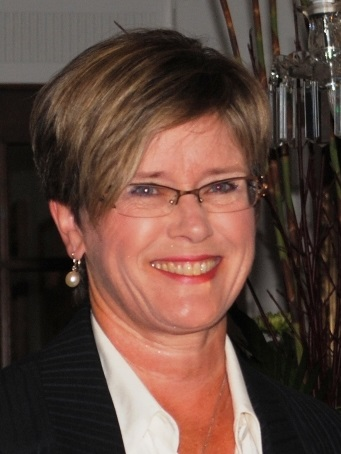

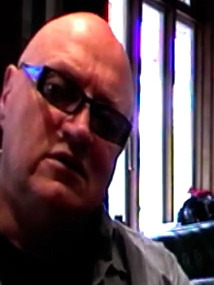
| Candidate | Kerry Prendergast | Bryan Pepperell |
| Party | Independent | Independent |
| Popular vote | 27,002 | 18,115 |
| Percentage | 59.85 | 40.15 |
Mayor before election
Kerry Prendergast
Elected mayor
Kerry Prendergast

The 2004 Wellington mayoral election was part of the 2004 New Zealand local elections. On 9 October 2004, elections were held for the Mayor of Wellington plus other local government roles. Kerry Prendergast was re-elected for a second term as mayor of Wellington. This was the first Wellington mayoral election to be held under the Instant runoff voting system.

== Candidates ==
There were seven candidates nominated for the election:

- Bryon Charles Burke, a Newtown environmentalist
- Rob Goulden, Councillor for the Eastern Ward since 1998
- Stephen Hay, an unemployed film-maker stood for the Anti-Capitalist Alliance
- Timothy O'Brien, a writer and broadcaster from Mount Cook
- Kerry Prendergast, Incumbent Mayor since 2001
- Bryan Pepperell, Councillor for the Southern Ward since 1996
- Jack Ruben, former city councillor

Bryon Burke withdrew from the Mayoral election on 13 September 2004.

== Results ==
2004 Wellington mayoral election
| Party | Candidate | FPv% | Count | | | | |
| Party | Candidate | FPv% | 1 | 2 | 3 | 4 | 5 |
|---|---|---|---|---|---|---|---|
| Independent | Kerry Prendergast | 42.39 | 22,069 | 22,200 | 23,170 | 23,926 | 27,002 |
| Independent | Bryan Pepperell | 15.35 | 7,993 | 8,274 | 10,448 | 14,220 | 18,115 |
| Independent | Rob Goulden | 14.79 | 7,703 | 7,868 | 9,334 | 10,388 | |
| Independent | Timothy O'Brien | 12.60 | 6,560 | 6,778 | 7,537 | | |
| Independent | Jack Ruben | 12.57 | 6,547 | 6,724 | | | |
| Anti-Capitalist Alliance | Stephen Hay | 2.30 | 1,195 | | | | |
Valid: 52,067 Spoilt: 268 Quota: 22,559

== Ward results ==
Candidates were also elected from wards to the Wellington City Council.

| Party/ticket | Councillors |
|---|---|
| Independent | 11 |
| Labour | 1 |
| Greens | 1 |
| Alliance | 1 |
