= John Blumsky =

New Zealand journalist and broadcaster

John Blumsky QSM
- Born: John Patrick Cyril Blumsky; 13 November 1928
- Died: 1 August 2013 (aged 84); Christchurch, New Zealand
- Occupation: Broadcast journalist
- Children: Mark Blumsky

John Patrick Cyril Blumsky QSM (13 November 1928 – 1 August 2013) was a New Zealand journalist and broadcaster, best known for his coverage of the Erebus disaster in 1979.

== Biography ==
Blumsky was of Polish descent, and grew up in Greymouth and Nelson. He was educated at Nelson College from 1943 to 1945. Before moving into broadcast journalism, he worked as an insurance clerk.

In the early 1960s, Blumsky was a broadcaster with station 2XN in Nelson. He was also an active member of the Nelson Operatic Society at that time. He was a member of Johnny Shearer's skiffle group, alongside Cliff Whiting, in 1961.

In late 1962, Blumsky was transferred by the New Zealand Broadcasting Corporation to Dunedin, where he worked on both radio and the newly established television station DNTV2. In Dunedin, Blumsky continued his involvement in amateur dramatics, playing Dr Lomas in the Southern Comedy Players' 1963 production of The Pohutukawa Tree, directed by the play's author, Bruce Mason.

Blumsky ran for the New Zealand Parliament in the 1972 general election, standing unsuccessfully for the National Party against Tom McGuigan in the Lyttelton electorate. His son, Mark Blumsky, later became Mayor of Wellington and a National Party Member of Parliament.

Following the crash of an Air New Zealand DC-10 into Mt Erebus on 28 November 1979, Blumsky gained prominence as the only broadcast journalist sent to Antarctica to cover the disaster for the world's media. He was also one of the pioneers of talkback radio in New Zealand. In December 1997, Newstalk ZB cut Blumsky's Sunday radio show, which he co-hosted with Mike Minehan.

In the 2001 Queen's Birthday Honours, Blumsky was awarded the Queen's Service Medal for public services.

Blumsky died in Christchurch in 2013.
