= 2010 Wellington mayoral election =

New Zealand local election

- 9 October 2010
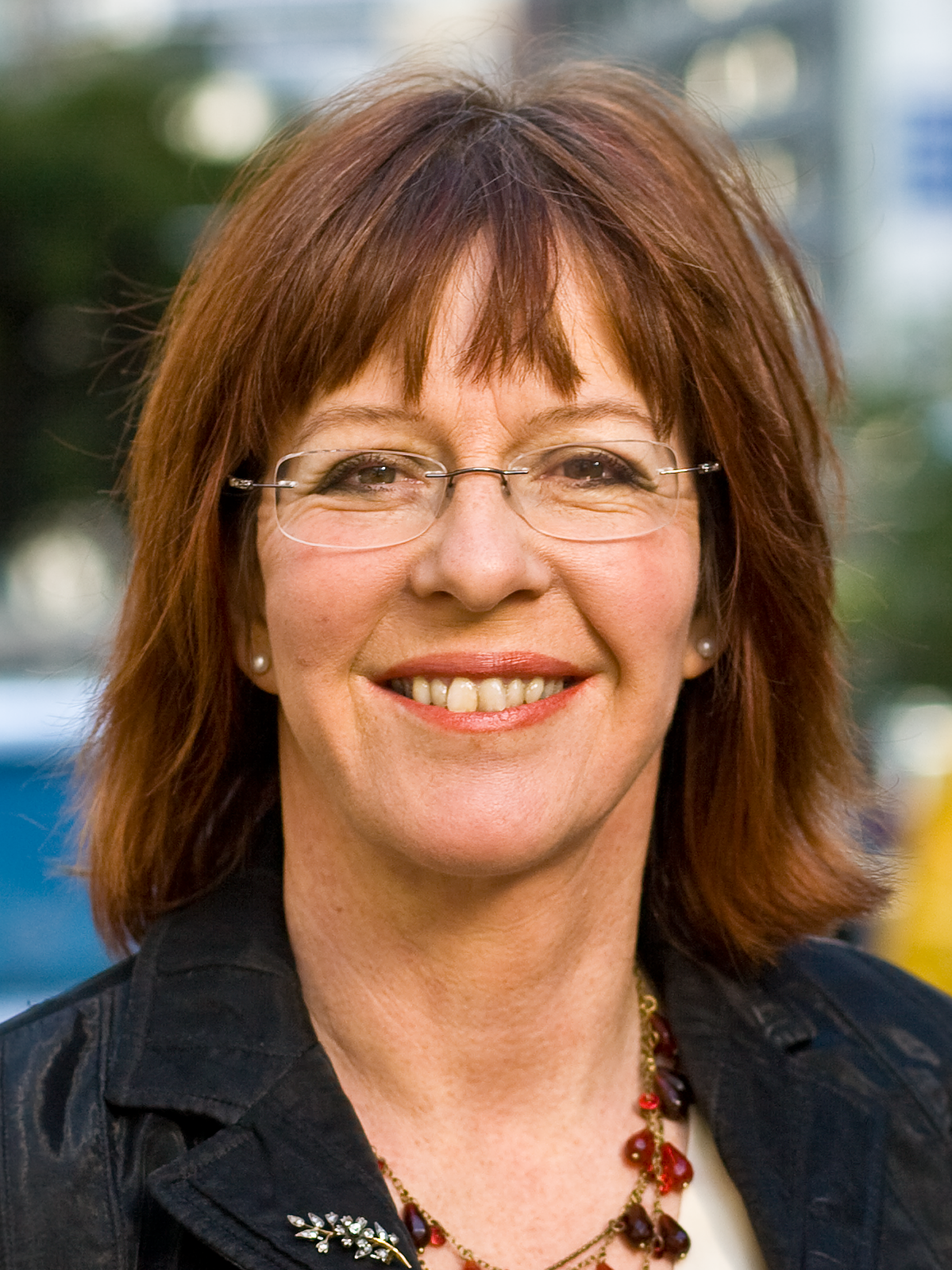

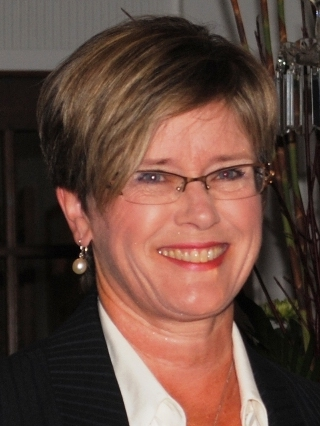

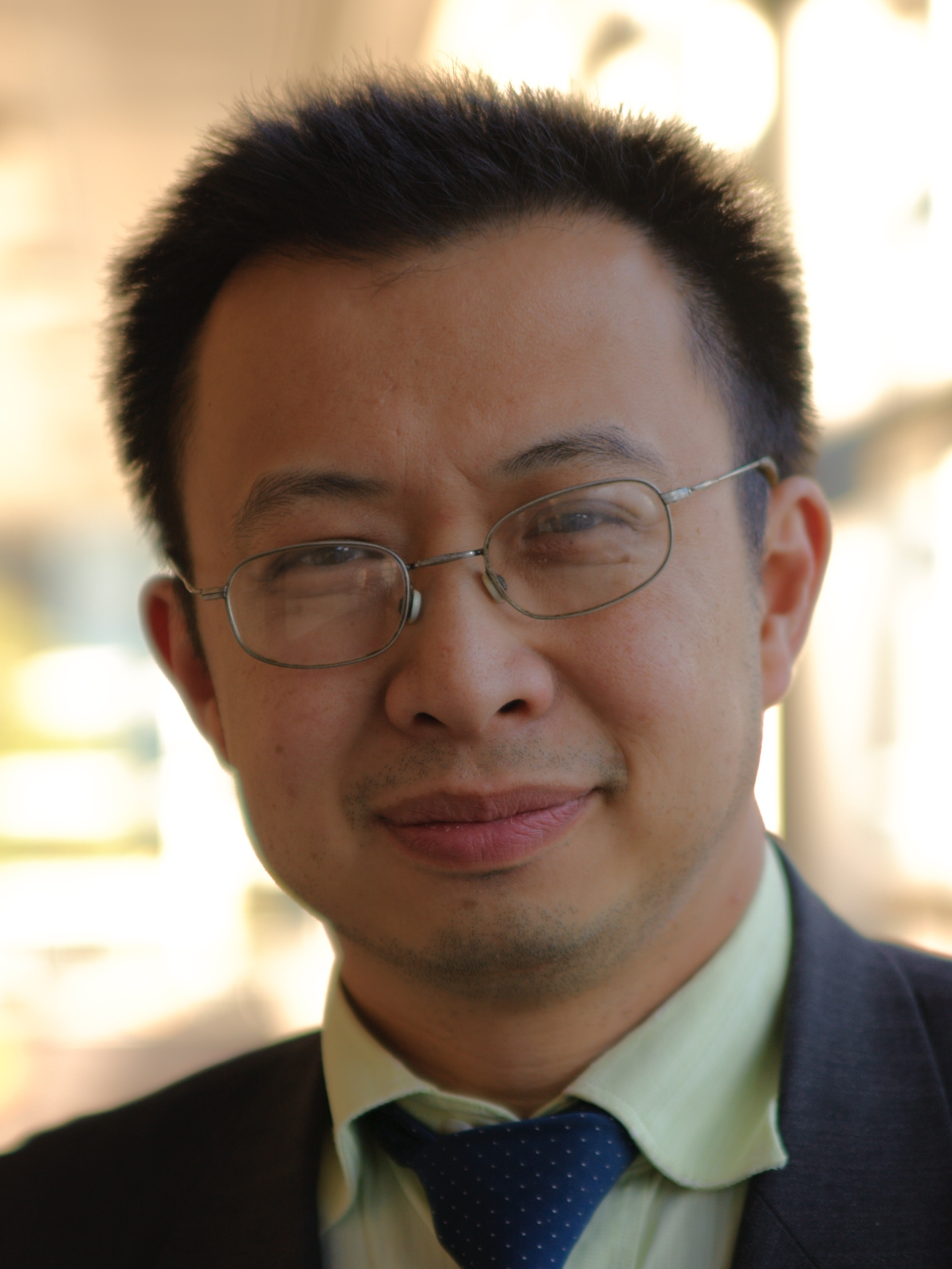
Candidate	Celia Wade-Brown	Kerry Prendergast	Jack Yan
Party	Independent	Independent	Independent
First preferences	18,560	21,809	5,817
First preferences	34.78%	40.86%	10.90%
2-Candidate Preferred	24,881	24,705
2-Candidate Preferred (%)	50.18%	49.82%
Mayor before election
Kerry Prendergast
Elected mayor
Celia Wade-Brown

The 2010 Wellington mayoral election is part of the 2010 New Zealand local elections. On 9 October 2010, elections were held for the Mayor of Wellington plus other local government roles. Sitting Green Party councillor Celia Wade-Brown defeated incumbent mayor Kerry Prendergast and four other candidates.

== Local government elections ==
On 9 October 2010, elections were held for the position of mayor of Wellington, for 14 councillors representing the 5 wards of the city council, for the city's 12 community board representatives, for the Capital and Coast District Health Board, for the Greater Wellington Regional Council and for the Hutt Mana Charitable Trust.

Local authority elections are held throughout New Zealand triennially and are conducted by postal vote.

Wellington is one of eight local bodies in New Zealand that uses the Single transferable vote system to elect its mayor and councillors.

== Timeline ==
Nominations opened for candidates to register with the returning officer on 23 July 2010. Nominations close on 20 Aug 2010. Voting documents will be delivered on 17 Sep 2010.

Under section 10 of the Local Electoral Act 2001, a "general election of members of every local authority or community board must be held on the second Saturday in October in every third year" from the date the Act came into effect in 2001, meaning 9 October 2010. On election day, voting closed at 12 noon.

== Candidates ==
Candidates who declared that they would contest the mayoralty were the incumbent Kerry Prendergast (who announced that she would want a fourth term back in early 2010 after initially ruling it out), city councillor Celia Wade-Brown and Jack Yan. Alan Probert opted not to stand and instead endorsed Wade-Brown. Several other candidates including Andy Foster, Brian Pepperell and Rob Goulden have announced that they will stand for the mayoralty. The final candidates standing in the 2010 election were: Mayor Kerry Prendergast, councillors Celia Wade-Brown and Bryan Pepperell, businessman Jack Yan, Al Mansell and Bernard O'Shaughnessy.

Name	Affiliation (if any)	Notes
Al Mansell		
Bernard O'Shaughnessy	Coalition and Transition	
Bryan Pepperell	For the Public Interest	Current Southern ward councillor
Kerry Prendergast	Kerry4Mayor	Incumbent
Celia Wade-Brown	A good choice for Wellington	Current Southern ward councillor
Jack Yan		

== Opinion polls ==
An opinion poll for the Dominion Post asked on 3 March 2010:

Would you vote for Kerry Prendergast for a fourth term as Wellington mayor?

22% said that they would vote for her, whilst 57% said that they would not. Another online poll conducted by the Dominion Post asked on 25 November 2009:

Who should be Wellington's next mayor?

As of mid May 2010, 450 people had voted, with Bryan Pepperell achieving 40.3% of the votes, Celia Wade Brown was second with 26.9% and Kerry Prendergast was on 4.0%.

One poll released on 2 October 2010, showed Prendergast with 33% followed by Wade-Brown on 25%. Jack Yan had 9% with Bryan Peperell on 8%.

== Result ==
Celia Wade-Brown won the election in the final round of the single transferable vote count by 24,881 to 24,705. She was ranked ahead of Kerry Prendergast on a significant number of ballots from the four trailing candidates after they were eliminated, which allowed her to overcome Prendergast's lead after the first round of counting (21,809 to 18,560), although Kerry Prendergast was leading by 40 votes before special votes were counted.

2010 Wellington mayoral election
Party	Candidate	FPv%	Count				
Party	Candidate	FPv%	1	2	3	4	5
Independent	✓ Celia Wade-Brown	34.77	18,560	18,675	19,002	21,422	24,881
Independent	Kerry Prendergast	40.86	21,809	21,863	22,021	22,899	24,705
Independent	Jack Yan	10.89	5,817	5,924	6,144	7,426	
Independent	Bryan Pepperell	10.41	5,560	5,652	5,954		
Independent	Bernard O'Shaughnessy	2.02	1,081	1,174			
Independent	Al Mansell	1.01	542				
Electorate: 135,556 Valid: 53,369 Spoilt: 1,005 Quota: 26,685 Turnout: 54,374 (40.11%)

== Ward results ==
Candidates were also elected from wards to the Wellington City Council.

Party/ticket	Councillors
Independent	11
Labour	2
Greens	1
