= Kerry Prendergast =

New Zealand politician

Dame Kerry Prendergast DNZM JP
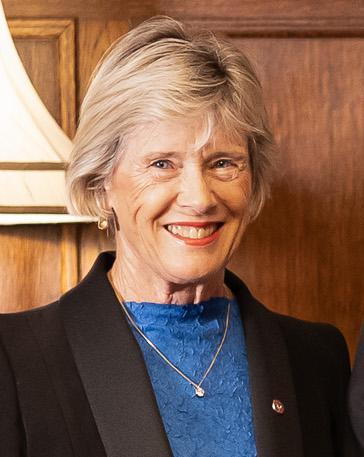
- Prendergast in 2026

33rd Mayor of Wellington
- In office 27 October 2001 – 27 October 2010
- Deputy: Alick Shaw (2001–2007); Ian McKinnon (2007–2010)
- Preceded by: Mark Blumsky
- Succeeded by: Celia Wade-Brown

20th Deputy Mayor of Wellington
- In office 28 October 1995 – 27 October 2001
- Mayor: Mark Blumsky
- Preceded by: David Watt
- Succeeded by: Alick Shaw

Personal details
- Born: Kerry Leigh Ferrier; 28 March 1953 (age 73) Christchurch, New Zealand
- Party: National
- Spouses: 1. Paul Prendergast; 2. Rex Nicholls
- Children: 3

Dame Kerry Leigh Prendergast DNZM JP (née Ferrier; born 28 March 1953) is a New Zealand politician who served as the 33rd Mayor of Wellington between 2001 and 2010, succeeding Mark Blumsky. She was the second woman to hold the position, after Fran Wilde.

== Early life ==
Prendergast was born in Christchurch but grew up in Tawa, attending Tawa College (1966–69), where she was captain of the college netball team. She qualified as a registered nurse and then trained as a midwife and was later awarded the Royal New Zealand Plunket Society Long Service Award in 1991. She has also been a voluntary grief counsellor. She holds an MBA degree from Victoria University of Wellington.

== Local-body politics ==
Prendergast started her political life as a Tawa Borough councillor in 1986. In 1989 she was elected to Wellington City Council and was re-elected every three years until 2010. In 1995 Prendergast became Deputy Mayor to Mark Blumsky.

She was a speculated candidate for the National Party nomination at the 1992 Wellington Central by-election, but quickly ruled herself out as a candidate, but stated national politics were a "future possibility" for her. In the 1999 general election Prendergast stood as a National list candidate, ranked 30th on the party's list. However, the National Party did not gain enough of the party vote for Prendergast to enter Parliament. She considered running again at the 2002 election, but in 2001 Mark Blumsky announced his intention not to run for the mayoralty again, and endorsed Prendergast's mayoralty candidacy.

Prendergast was elected mayor in 2001 and re-elected in 2004 and 2007. During her time as Mayor, Prendergast instigated the policy of making Wellington the "Creative Capital". She has endorsed changing the Flag of New Zealand.

In the 2010 Wellington City mayoral election, Prendergast was challenged by Green Party city councillor Celia Wade-Brown for the Wellington mayoralty. After the counting of special votes, Wade-Brown was declared the winner by a 176-vote margin, ending nearly a decade of Prendergast's mayoralty.

== Other roles ==
In 2011 she became chair of the Environmental Protection Authority and of the Tourism Board. She is on the board of Kirkaldie and Stains Ltd, WorkSafe NZ, Phoenix Football Club, and is on several advisory boards.

Prendergast was Vice President of Local Government New Zealand and a trustee of the Joe Aspell Trust during her time as Mayor. She has been executive chair of the New Zealand International Festival of the Arts since 2011. She was a director of Wellington International Airport Limited and the Wellington Region Association of Midwives until 2010. She is an honorary life member of the Katherine Mansfield Birthplace Society and of Plunket.

In 2015 Prendergast accepted the role of ambassador for Alzheimer's New Zealand, having had personal experience of the disease - both her late father Denis and her mother Beverley Ferrier suffered the disease.

== Honours and awards ==
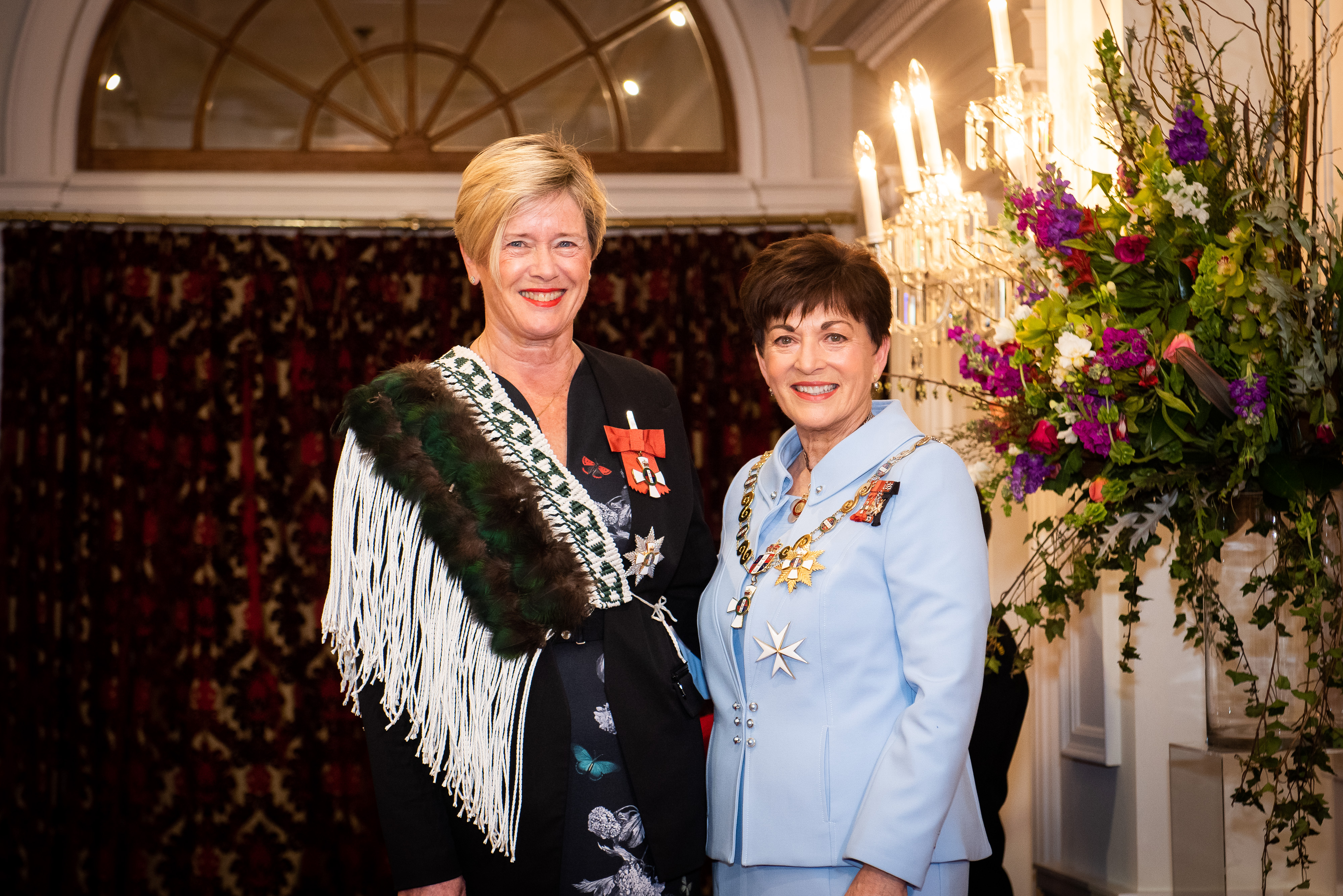
Prendergast (left) in 2019, after her investiture as a Dame Companion of the New Zealand Order of Merit by the governor-general, Dame Patsy Reddy, at Government House, Wellington

In the 2011 Queen's Birthday Honours, Prendergast was appointed a Companion of the New Zealand Order of Merit, for services to local-body affairs, and in the 2019 New Year Honours, she was promoted to Dame Companion of the New Zealand Order of Merit, for services to governance and the community.

In 2014, Prendergast received the New Zealand Women of Influence Award in the local and regional category.

== Personal life ==
Prendergast's father, Denis Ferrier, was also a local politician. In 1970 he was elected to the Tawa Borough Council and in 1986 he was elected to the Kapiti Borough Council. She is married and has two daughters. Her son, Andrew, was killed on 31 March 2011 in a riding accident.

== Recent legal and personal controversies ==
=== Driver's licence suspension ===
In March 2026, Prendergast publicly admitted that her driver's licence had been suspended for three months after she accumulated 100 demerit points for speeding five times over a two-year period. The suspension led to public calls for her to resign from her position on the Wellington Free Ambulance board.

=== Parking ticket court battle ===
In 2024, Prendergast challenged a $40 parking ticket issued by the Wellington City Council for parking her Tesla in an area deemed a "footpath". She successfully argued the case in the Wellington District Court, with the judge ruling the council had not legally designated the area as a footpath.

=== Town Hall document scandal ===
In 2025, confidential papers from Prendergast's mayoral term—including whistleblower allegations and staff pay details—were found inside a desk bought from a tip shop. Prendergast expressed outrage at the privacy breach.

Political offices
Preceded by Mark Blumsky	Mayor of Wellington; 2001–2010	Succeeded by Celia Wade-Brown
Preceded by David Watt	Deputy Mayor of Wellington; 1995–2001	Succeeded by Alick Shaw
