= SJS =

SJS may refer to:

== Medicine ==
- Schwartz–Jampel syndrome, a genetic disease
- Stevens–Johnson syndrome, a skin disorder
- Swyer-James syndrome, a lung disorder

== Organisations ==
- San Jacinto Seminary, Philippines
- San Jose Sharks, NHL hockey team
- San Jose State, a university in San Jose, California
- Shanghai Japanese School, China
- St. John's School (Texas), Houston, US
- Student Job Search, New Zealand

== Other ==
- Scientific jury selection
- St. James Street railway station, London (National Rail station code)
