= Enid Evans =

New Zealand librarian (1914–2011)

- Born: 8 October 1914; Gore, New Zealand
- Died: 23 May 2011 (aged 96)
- Occupation: Librarian

Enid Annie Evans QSM (8 October 1914 – 23 May 2011) was one of New Zealand's first women chief librarians. She was the chief librarian of the Auckland War Memorial Museum Library from 1946 to 1970.

== Biography ==
=== Early life ===
Evans was born in Gore, New Zealand, on 8 October 1914 to Robert Edward Evans and Annie Evans (née Shaw). Her father was a Presbyterian minister and in 1916 the family moved to Dunedin, as he had been transferred to North East Valley. Evans attended North East Valley School until 1926 when the family moved again, to Hāwera, Taranaki. She then attended Hawera Main School and Hawera High School. In 1932 Evans' father was appointed minister at Mount Albert Presbyterian Church in Auckland, and the family moved one more time.

From 1933 to 1938, Evans studied English and French at Auckland University College, graduating with a bachelor of arts degree.

=== Career ===
In 1936, while still studying, Evans started working in the college library as an assistant to Alice Minchin. In 1942 she was promoted to a first assistant, and from 1945 to 1946 served as acting librarian following Minchin's retirement. During this time Evans also studied for a librarian's qualification with the Library Association of England.

In 1946 Evans was appointed chief librarian at the Auckland War Memorial Museum Library, the first professional librarian to be employed there. During her tenure she was instrumental in acquiring a number of significant archival collections: in 1952 the library acquired the Edward Earl Vaile collection on Pacific exploration, and in 1969 acquired a donation of early New Zealand newspapers from publishers Wilson and Horton. In 1961 Evans accepted the New Zealand Women's Archive from Enid Roberts, who had begun the archive of notable New Zealand women's biographies in 1955. Chief librarians at other research libraries in the country had declined to accept the collection, however Evans not only accepted the archive, but actively developed it through regular workshops with local members of the National Council of Women.

Evans worked to enable easier access to the library collection for researchers by manually indexing early colonial newspapers and letters and manuscripts of early missionaries and other settlers. She also made significant contributions to the training of new librarians, by teaching Library Certificate courses for the New Zealand Library Association Inc. and by writing a textbook on classifying and cataloging.

Evans used her knowledge to write non-fiction articles on Auckland and New Zealand history and people, including in The New Zealand Herald and the Auckland Star newspapers, the Encyclopaedia of New Zealand and the Dictionary of New Zealand Biography.

Evans retired from the library in 1970, aged 56 years old. She later worked as a reference librarian at the Auckland Public Library and was librarian for the Royal Australasian College of Physicians in New Zealand. She became an Honorary Life Member of the Auckland Institute and Museum in 1988, and in the 1989 New Year Honours, Evans was awarded the Queen's Service Medal for community service.

Evans died in 2011, aged 96.
