= Wally Hirsh =

New Zealand educator and race relations conciliator (1936–2024)

Wally Hirsh OBE JP

Race Relations Conciliator
- In office March 1986 – July 1989
- Preceded by: Hiwi Tauroa
- Succeeded by: Chris Laidlaw

Personal details
- Born: Walter Hirsh; 24 March 1936 Mönchengladbach, Gau Düsseldorf, Germany
- Died: 31 December 2024 (aged 88) Auckland, New Zealand
- Spouse: Adele de Woolf (m. 1958)
- Children: 3
- Education: Victoria University of Wellington
- Occupation: Teacher; school principal; school inspector

Walter Hirsh OBE JP (24 March 1936 – 31 December 2024) was a New Zealand educator. He served as Race Relations Conciliator between 1986 and 1989.

== Early life, education and family ==
Hirsh was born in Mönchengladbach, Germany, on 24 March 1936, the son of Margot (née Jammer) and Ernst Hirsh. In 1938, his family fled Nazi persecution to find a new life in Milton, New Zealand, and he became a naturalised New Zealand citizen in 1946. He was educated at Tokomairiro District High School, Macandrew Intermediate School and Otago Boys' High School in Dunedin.

Hirsh began studying for a commerce degree at the University of Otago, and in late 1954 he was awarded a scholarship by the Zionist Council for a year's study at the Hebrew University of Jerusalem. He subsequently studied at Wellington Teachers' College and obtained a Trained Teacher's Certificate in 1958. He then studied at Victoria University, completing two degrees before embarking on a career in education and race relations.

In 1958, Hirsh married Adele de Woolf; they had two sons and one daughter.

== Career ==
From 1959 to 1965, Hirsh worked as a teacher in the Wellington region. From 1965 to 1969, he was a country teacher and school principal. In 1970, he lectured at Wellington Teachers' College. He was principal at Mount Cook School (1971–1974) and Karori West Normal School (1975–1985). He was inspector of schools in 1980.

Hirsh was awarded a Fulbright Scholarship in 1975, and travelled among Navajo and Mohawk communities in the United States and Canada.

In March 1986, Hirsh succeeded Hiwi Tauroa as New Zealand's Race Relations Conciliator and a Human Rights Commissioner, and served in that role for three years. Other positions he held included a consultancy with New Zealand's Ethnic Affairs Department, department head at Auckland University of Technology, and principal of Auckland's main Jewish education centre, Kadimah College. Hirsh has also authored several books, among them the autobiography, Out of The Shadows: My life's journey from Monchengladbach to Milton and beyond (2013). He was the foundation chairman of the New Zealand Jewish Council, from 1980 to 1985.

== Honours and awards ==
Hirsh was appointed an Officer of the Order of the British Empire in the 1990 New Year Honours, in recognition of his service as Race Relations Conciliator. He was appointed a justice of the peace in 1993.

== Death ==
Hirsh died in Auckland on 31 December 2024, at the age of 88.
