= Paul Hunt (academic) =

British human rights specialist

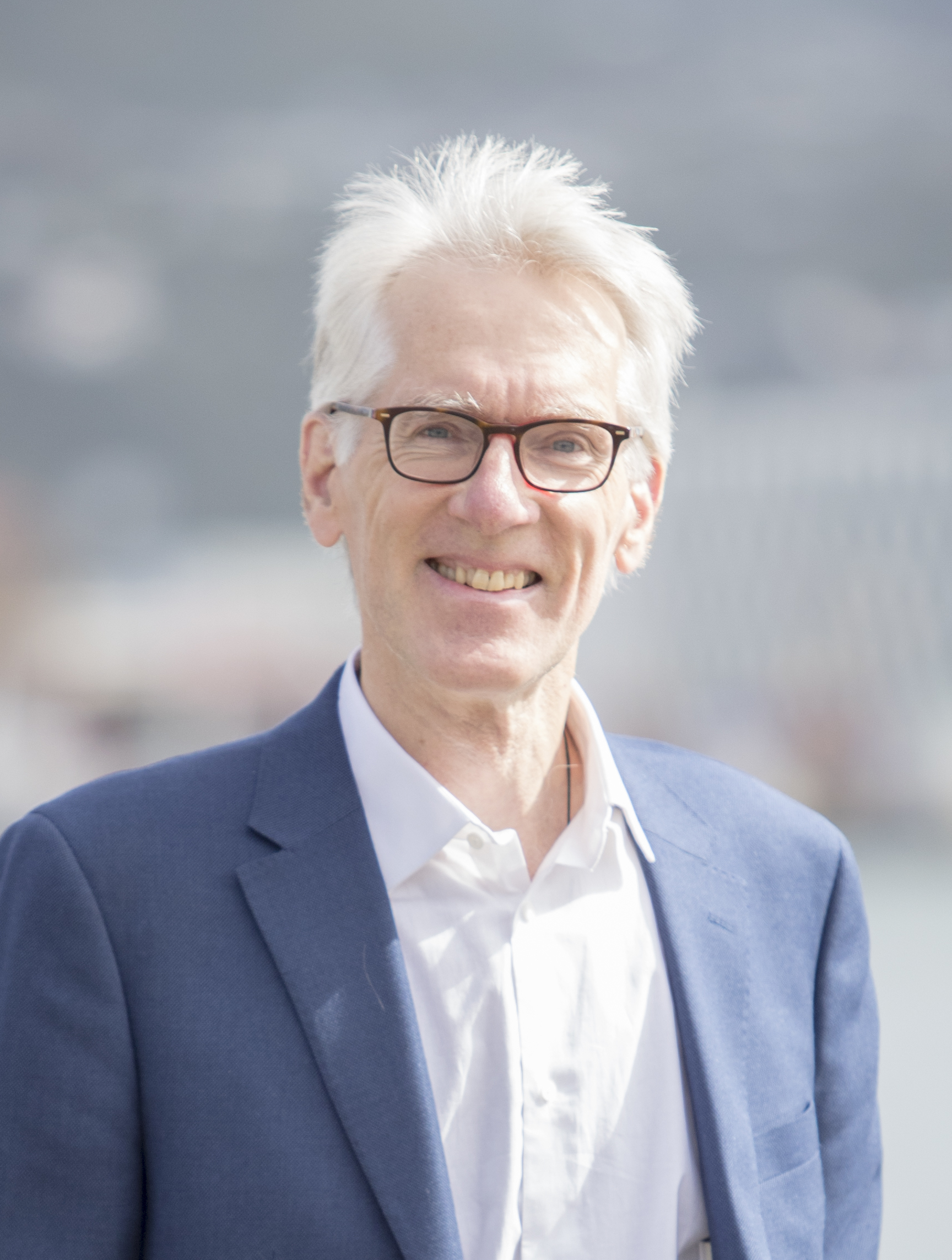
- Hunt in 2019

Chief Human Rights Commissioner of New Zealand
- In office 14 January 2019 – 13 January 2024
- Prime Minister: Jacinda Ardern; Chris Hipkins; Christopher Luxon
- Preceded by: Paula Tesoriero (Acting)
- Succeeded by: Karanina Sumeo (Acting)

Personal details
- Born: 6 December 1955 (age 70) Wegberg, West Germany
- Spouse: Joan E. Taylor
- Education: University of Cambridge
- Website: Profile website

Paul Hunt is British–New Zealand human rights expert who specialises in economic, social and cultural rights. Between 2019–2024, he held the office of Chief Commissioner at the New Zealand Human Rights Commission.

Formerly a Senior Lecturer at the University of Waikato he is Professor of Law at the Human Rights Centre, University of Essex. He has held senior UN human rights appointments, including Member of the UN Committee on Economic, Social and Cultural Rights, UN Special Rapporteur on the right to the highest attainable standard of health and Senior Human Rights Advisor to the Assistant WHO Director-General, Flavia Bustreo.

== Background ==
In 1979, he graduated from Cambridge University (UK) with a law degree. Between 1982–1985, he worked for law firm Kingsley Napley (London) as a civil and criminal litigation solicitor, and assistant to the Senior Partner, Sir David Napley. In 1988, he married New Zealander Joan E. Taylor and in 1992 moved to New Zealand where he took up the position of Senior Lecturer at the University of Waikato. In 1995, he was awarded a Masters of Jurisprudence (1st Class Hons) by the University of Waikato (New Zealand). In 2000, he was appointed Professor of Law at the University of Essex (UK) and also became a Visiting Professor at the University of Waikato. In 2018, he moved back to New Zealand to take up the position of Chief Commissioner in the New Zealand Human Rights Commission. In January 2024 his 5-year term ended and he returned to his position as Professor at Essex University.

== Human rights ==
In 1985, Hunt left private practice and became a human rights lawyer in Israel/Palestine working for Quaker Peace and Service. Between 1985 and 1987, he lived in the West Bank and Gaza Strip and researched the Israeli Military Courts. Published in 1987, Justice? The Military Court System in the Israeli-Occupied Territories, examined the Military Courts through the "lens" of Israel's international human rights obligations.

On his return to the UK, Hunt worked with Sydney D. Bailey on an inter-denominational project about human rights in Britain and Ireland. This Quaker project included Mary Robinson, shortly to become the President of Ireland, and David Trimble, shortly to become leader of the Ulster Unionist Party and First Minister of Northern Ireland. The project led to Human Rights and Responsibilities in Britain and Ireland, edited by Bailey, and a shorter version, A Christian Perspective on Human Rights and Responsibilities: with Special Reference to Northern Ireland, edited by Hunt.

Between 1987–1990, Hunt worked for the National Council for Civil Liberties/Liberty (UK) as Legal Officer, Head of the Legal and Campaign Team and Acting General Secretary. He conducted national and international human rights cases, including litigation in Strasbourg under the European Convention on Human Rights. In addition to prisoners' rights, he worked on the lawfulness of Northern Ireland's emergency laws.

Between 1990–1992, Hunt was appointed Associate Director of the African Centre for Democracy and Human Rights Studies (Gambia), working under Raymond Sock (formerly Solicitor-General) and Hassan Jallow (then Minister of Justice). The Centre paralleled and monitored the new Gambian-based African Commission on Human and Peoples' Rights established under the African Charter on Human and Peoples' Rights. With Jallow, Hunt co-authored one of the first publications on HIV/AIDS and human rights in Africa, as well as research on African national human rights institutions.

== Academic career ==
Between 1992–2000, Hunt was senior lecturer at the University of Waikato, New Zealand. The focus of his teaching and research was national and international public law, especially human rights. He began to specialise in economic, social and cultural rights and his study, Reclaiming Social Rights: International and Comparative Perspectives, was published in 1996. This was one of the first books published on social rights. Reviewing it in the Human Rights Quarterly, Barbara Stark remarked upon the book's ambition and concluded, "Hunt succeeds brilliantly" and that the study "dazzles".

At the University of Waikato, Hunt looked at human rights in New Zealand and the South Pacific, including the relationship between culture and rights, as well as the rights of indigenous peoples, which led to scholarship such as Culture, Rights and Cultural Rights: Perspectives from the South Pacific, co-edited with Margaret Wilson. Between 1996–97, he was a visiting fellow at the Harvard Law School Human Rights Program. In 2000, Hunt, Janet McLean, Bill Mansfield and Peter Cooper were commissioned by New Zealand's Attorney-General to prepare an independent report on the country's national human rights institutions. Many of their recommendations have been implemented by legislative and other reforms.

In 2000, Hunt was appointed Professor of Law at the Human Rights Centre, University of Essex (UK), a position he still holds. At Essex, his teaching and research focus is national and international human rights, with a particular emphasis on economic, social and cultural rights, as well as human rights and development. He has served as Director of the Human Rights Centre and Chair of the Democratic Audit.

== UN Committees (1999–2002) ==
In 1998, the New Zealand Government nominated Hunt to serve as an independent expert on the United Nations Committee on Economic, Social and Cultural Rights in Geneva, and he was duly elected by States. He served as the Committee's Rapporteur from 1999 to 2002. During this period, the Committee adopted several influential commentaries, known as General Comments, on economic, social and cultural rights, including on the right to adequate food, right to education, right to the highest attainable standard of health, and right to water. It also adopted some statements, including one on poverty and human rights, which broke new ground. These General Comments and statements have contributed to the growth of literature, and national and international initiatives, on economic, social and cultural rights since the turn of the century.

In light of the Committee's statement on poverty, Mary Robinson, UN High Commissioner for Human Rights, asked Hunt, Manfred Nowak and Siddiq Osmani to draft detailed and operational guidance on a human rights-based approach to poverty reduction. They responded by writing Human Rights and Poverty Reduction: A Conceptual Framework, followed by Draft Guidelines: A Human Rights Approach to Poverty Reduction Strategies, both of which were published by the UN Office of the High Commissioner for Human Rights (OHCHR). After a period of consultation, OHCHR revised the Draft Guidelines and they were published as Principles and Guidelines for a Human Rights Approach to Poverty Reduction Strategies.

== UN Special Rapporteur (2002–2008) ==
In 2002, Hunt stepped down from the UN Committee on Economic, Social and Cultural Rights and was appointed the first UN Special Rapporteur on the right to the highest attainable standard of health ('right to health'). In this independent capacity, he reported, orally and in writing, to the UN General Assembly, UN Commission on Human Rights and UN Human Rights Council. He submitted thematic reports on a wide range of right to health issues, such as sexual and reproductive health, neglected diseases, mental disability, maternal mortality, and the health-rights responsibilities of pharmaceutical companies. He also visited, and wrote right to health reports on, countries, including India, Peru, Sweden, and Uganda. Hunt took the unorthodox step of undertaking visits to, and preparing right to health reports on, non-state actors, such as the World Trade Organization, World Bank and International Monetary Fund, and GlaxoSmithKline. Also, he prepared reports with other Rapporteurs on Guantanamo Bay, as well as the Lebanon/Israel conflict of 2006.

His reports have elicited a wide response, for example, in 2005, Cynthia Rothschild discussed the report on sexual and reproductive health, "Hunt's 2004 report is certainly one of the UN system's most far-reaching documents to incorporate a focus on sexual orientation and gender identity and health". Some commentators called the report "shocking" and Hunt was branded "unprofessional" in the UN Commission on Human Rights.

On maternal death and morbidity, Sandeep Prasad wrote, it "was [Hunt] who first started bringing the human rights dimensions of the issue of maternal mortality to the attention of the [UN Human Rights] Council as a global Health and Human Rights crisis." Following a press conference in Delhi at the end of his visit to India, during which he focussed on maternal mortality in Rajasthan and Maharashtra, the Indian Express devoted an editorial to the issue, reflected on Hunt's findings, and agreed with his conclusion that "the situation does not befit a country of India's stature and level of development."

Following Hunt's report on Peru, Ariel Frisancho Arroyo remarked upon "[t]he key role" played by Hunt in "supporting the health authorities' interest on how to increase the realization of health-rights". Following his report on Sweden, scholars wrote, "Since Hunt's report and the resulting [Right to Health Care Initiative], most county councils have issued more generous guiding principles for the health care of local undocumented patients." In an editorial, The Lancet commended Hunt's thematic report on the health-rights responsibilities of pharmaceutical companies, as well as his twin report on GlaxoSmithKline. Hunt devoted three UN thematic reports to the methodological problem of how to measure the progressive realisation of the right to health and their influence is manifest in the key OHCHR publication Human Rights Indicators: A Guide to Measurement and Implementation. He drew on several of his UN reports to co-author a major study on health systems and the right to health which was described by The Lancet as a "landmark" report.

== Human rights and the WHO ==
Hunt's reports, such as his studies on Peru and Uganda, demonstrate constructive engagement with the World Health Organization (WHO). In 2008, during his last oral report to the UN Human Rights Council as Special Rapporteur, Hunt acknowledged this co-operation but also emphasised its limits: "Over the last six years, I have enjoyed excellent cooperation with a number of WHO members of staff on a range of policy and operational issues. For this, I am extremely grateful. However, to the best of my knowledge, neither the World Health Assembly, nor the WHO Executive Board, have ever considered one of my reports. Despite requests, I have never met a WHO Director General since my appointment in 2002."

However, between 2011–2013, Hunt was appointed as a part-time Senior Human Rights Advisor to the Assistant Director-General, WHO, Flavia Bustreo, and he directed a project which researched whether there was evidence of impact of a human rights approach to health. This interdisciplinary and multi-author research concluded that applying human rights to women's and children's health policies and other interventions "not only helps governments comply with their binding national and international obligations, but also contributes to improving the health of women and children." In 2015, Hunt co-edited a Special Issue of Harvard's Health and Human Rights which deepened analysis of this topic.

In September 2010, Hunt co-organised an international roundtable in Geneva on maternal mortality, human rights and accountability, and the proceedings were subsequently published. In this roundtable, and in a paper he presented at an international conference in Delhi during November 2010, Hunt began to analyse accountability as having three components: monitoring, review and remedy. This analysis was novel because, in the context of global health, accountability was usually understood as monitoring and evaluation, without the components of either independent review or remedy.

In 2010–11, Hunt sat on a Working Group of the UN Commission on Information and Accountability on Women's and Children's Health (COIA). The Working Group refined Hunt's conception of accountability in its submission to COIA. In its final report, Keeping Promises, Measuring Results, COIA adopted this understanding of accountability. This conception of accountability shaped COIA's recommendations to the UN Secretary-General, Ban Ki-moon, and led to the Secretary-General establishing the independent Expert Review Group on Information and Accountability for Women's and Children's Health (iERG). The iERG sat from 2011 to 2015 and was succeeded by the Independent Accountability Panel which largely shares COIA's understanding of accountability. In 2015, Julian Schweitzer wrote in the British Medical Journal (BMJ) that the COIA's "definition of accountability – a cyclical process of monitoring, review, and action … – is now widely accepted in global health". Hunt was the main architect of this conception of accountability in global health.

== After WHO ==
Hunt turned his attention to social rights in the UK. In 2014–15, he sat on the statutory human rights inquiry into emergency health care established by the Northern Ireland Human Rights Commission. He joined the Board of the National Health Service (NHS) England initiative, Sexual and Reproductive Health Rights, Inclusion and Empowerment (SHRINE). He was appointed a Patron of Just Fair, a London-based think-tank on economic and social rights. With Ruth Lister, Baroness Lister of Burtersett he wrote for the think-tank, Compass, on social rights in the UK. In 2018, Hunt was appointed by Nicola Sturgeon, First Minister of Scotland, to her Advisory Group on Human Rights Leadership. In 2019 Hunt explored how to advance social rights in the UK without amending the Human Rights Act 1998.

== New Zealand Chief Human Rights Commissioner ==
=== Appointment and Term ===
On 2 October 2018, the New Zealand Minister of Justice Andrew Little in the left-wing Labour-Green coalition government led by Prime Minister Jacinda Ardern announced Hunt's appointment as Chief Human Rights Commissioner at the New Zealand Human Rights Commission/Te Kāhui Tika Tangata. He took up the role on 14 January 2019, for a 5-year term ending in 2024. Hunt's term coincided with the Christchurch mosque shootings, a severe housing crisis, the COVID-19 pandemic, the 2022 Wellington protest and the impact of the Israel-Gaza war on social cohesion in New Zealand. During his term Hunt introduced structural changes to the Human Rights Commission with a view to honouring the Treaty of Waitangi. The Commission actioned national inquiries into housing and into pay equity for Pacific People, and published Maranga Mai!: The dynamics and impacts of white supremacy, racism and colonisation upon tangata whenua in Aotearoa New Zealand , written by Māori experts on colonisation. Hunt was one of the first public figures on the scene in Christchurch after the mosque shootings, arriving to support the Muslim community.

=== 2021 Mongrel Mob Waikato Chapter Meeting ===
On 1 May 2021, as a social cohesion initiative, Hunt attended a half-day meeting of the Mongrel Mob Waikato Chapter, along with Green Party Co-leader Marama Davidson, Green MP Elizabeth Kerekere, and Anjum Rahman of the New Zealand Islamic Women's Council. The meeting focused on issues of human rights, social justice, and racism. Hunt spoke on the theme of 'Relationships, Responsibilities, Rights', with a sweatshirt emblazoned with these words, and was criticised for giving a $200 koha (donation) of taxpayer money to the gang.

Hunt stated in response: "Human rights means that every voice is heard, including your voice, and that you also listen with respect."

Hunt and Davidson were criticised by politicians from the National and ACT parties. National Party police spokesperson, Simeon Brown opined that it is "astonishing" that the pair had accepted an invitation to speak at the gathering, stating that: "The Mongrel Mob peddles drugs, wields firearms and engages in violence, causing misery in communities across the country. They have no regard for their victims." The ACT Party also criticised Davidson and Hunt for attending, with justice spokesperson Nicole McKee saying it is a "kick in the guts" for victims of the Mongrel Mob. As a result of this, National Party leader Judith Collins called for the resignation of Hunt, while ACT Party leader David Seymour called for the end of the Human Rights Commission in favour of creating a new organisation devoid of left-wing tendencies.

However, Hunt and Davidson also received public support for this engagement, and Māori Labour MP Willie Jackson said it was appropriate in terms of tikanga.

In a statement to Newshub, Hunt defended speaking at the event, and using taxpayer money to provide a koha to the Waikato Chapter, which had recently launched a reform programme:

I attended the hui to speak, listen and discuss the experiences raised by the Waikato Mongrel Mob Kingdom, acknowledging that these experiences are part of a wider conversation about the importance of social inclusion and belonging in Aotearoa. I look forward to the Human Rights Commission further engaging with the Waikato Mongrel Mob Kingdom in the future, in an honest and constructive spirit.

In June 2021, Newshub revealed correspondence between the Human Rights Commission and the Waikato Mongrel Mob Kingdom to indicate that significant organisation had occurred, with an agreement that no press releases were to be published prior to the event, news media were barred access, and members would be restricted in their use of social media during the event. Hunt's attendance came about after Waikato Mongrel Mob public relations liaison Louise Hutchinson approached the HRC in December, asking if it was possible for him to do a presentation in 2021, since the Waikato Chapter were trying to engage positively in society.

=== 2022 Wellington protest ===
In the anti-vaccine mandate protests in February and March 2022 a large number of protesters encamped in front of Parliament House. Hunt was asked by protest leaders to meet to discuss a resolution. While government politicians and officials refused to meet with them, Hunt insisted that speaking with the protesters was "fostering inclusion". Hunt met with protesters with the intention of using dialogue to resolve the protests and prevent further escalation of violence. The protest nevertheless ended violently when protestors clashed with riot police as they cleared the camp.

=== End of Term ===
Following the 2023 New Zealand general election, in which a coalition was formed between the conservative New Zealand National Party, the right-wing ACT Party and the populist New Zealand First Party, the new Minister of Justice Paul Goldsmith confirmed that he would not seek to reappoint Hunt for a second term as Chief Human Rights Commissioner. Hunt's term expired in January 2024. Earlier, Goldsmith had declined to express confidence in Hunt's role as Chief Human Rights Commissioner.

However, on Hunt's completion of his term, Chief Ombudsman Peter Boshier, National Iwi Chairs forum Chair Margaret Mutu and President of Multicultural New Zealand Pancha Narayanan, among others, praised Hunt for his integrity and positive contribution to human and indigenous rights in Aotearoa New Zealand. During his term he received the Ann Dysart Distinguished Service Award from Multicultural New Zealand and an Honorary Doctorate from the University of Waikato.

== Other ==
Hunt has provided expert testimony to the European Court of Human Rights, via the Centre for Reproductive Rights, and Inter-American Court of Human Rights. In 1999–2000, he sat on the Advisory Panel of the UNDP Human Development Report, Human Rights and Human Development. He was one of the drafters of, and signatories to, the Yokyakarta Principles on the Application of International Human Rights Law in relation to Sexual Orientation and Gender Identity in 2006. In 2008, he co-founded the International Initiative on Maternal Mortality and Human Rights. Between 2009–2011, he sat on UNFPA's External Advisory Panel. Hunt sits on the Editorial Boards of the Health and Human Rights and International Journal of Human Rights and Drug Policy.

In 2008 Hunt was awarded an honorary doctorate by the Nordic School of Public Health.

In 2014, he gave a TEDx talk, Equality – the Road Less Travelled. In this he argues that the realisation of social rights, such as those in the Universal Declaration of Human Rights (1948), has a major contribution to make towards the enjoyment of substantive equality for all.

== Main publications ==
- Reclaiming Social Rights: International and Comparative Perspectives (Dartmouth, 1996)
- with Margaret Wilson (eds.) Culture, Rights and Cultural Rights: Perspectives from the South Pacific (Huia, 2000)
- with Willem van Genugten and Susan Mathews (eds.), World Bank, IMF and Human Rights: Including The Tilburg Guiding Principles on World Bank, IMF and human rights (Nijmegen, 2003)
- with Tony Gray (eds.), Maternal Mortality, Human Rights and Accountability (Routledge, 2013)
- with Flavia Bustreo et al., Women's and Children's Health: Evidence of Impact of Human Rights (World Health Organization, 2013)
