= Candice Harris =

New Zealand professor of management

Academic background
- Education: Victoria University of Wellington
- Thesis: Women and Power: a Study of New Zealand Women Business Travellers (2002)

Academic work
- Institutions: Auckland University of Technology
- Doctoral students: Katherine Ravenswood

Candice Amanda Harris is a New Zealand academic and Professor of Management at Auckland University of Technology, specializing in employee career experiences, gender and work, academic careers, and woman's career development.

== Academic career ==
Harris completed a PhD titled Women and Power: a Study of New Zealand Women Business Travellers at Victoria University of Wellington in 2002. Harris then joined the faculty of Auckland University of Technology, rising to full professor in 2018. As of 2024 Harris is head of the Management Department, in the Faculty of Business, Economics and Law.

Harris's research focuses on employee career experiences, gendered experiences in both paid and unpaid work, and is particularly interested in academic careers and women's careers. She has written about the difficulties older workers face with work–life balance, the poor working conditions in the New Zealand hospitality industry, and how to juggle working with childcare when having to work from home. Harris has also researched what employees value for benefits, but says "while it's nice to have benefits and perks, they don't count so much if you still don't have good management, fair pay, decent work, or work that's meaningful".

In 2009 Harris was appointed as a member of the Universities New Zealand Women in Leadership Steering Group, and since 2023 has been co-chair. She is a member of the Corporate Mothers Network, and is co-chair of the Council for Australasian Tourism and Hospitality Education Fellows.

Notable doctoral students of Harris's include Katherine Ravenswood, professor of industrial relations at AUT.

== Honours and awards ==
In 2018 Harris was awarded one of AUT's inaugural Vice Chancellor’s Diversity Awards for "her contributions in the area of gender and diversity within AUT and beyond".

== Selected works ==
=== Book ===
- Pritchard, A.; Morgan, N.; Ateljevic, I.; Harris, C., eds. (January 2007). Tourism and gender: embodiment, sensuality and experience (1 ed.). UK: CABI. doi:10.1079/9781845932718.0000. ISBN 978-1-84593-271-8.

=== Journal articles ===
- Irena Ateljevic; Candice Harris; Erica Wilson; Collins, Francis (2005). "Getting 'Entangled': Reflexivity and the 'Critical Turn' in Tourism Studies". Tourism Recreation Research. 30 (2): 9–21. doi:10.1080/02508281.2005.11081469. Wikidata Q124397833.
- Wilson, Erica and Candice Harris. "Meaningful travel: Women, independent travel and the search for self and meaning." Tourism: An International Interdisciplinary Journal, vol. 54, no. 2, 2006, pp. 161–172. https://hrcak.srce.hr/161466. Accessed 1 Feb. 2024
- Candice A. Harris; Sarah I. Leberman (2011). "Leadership Development for Women in New Zealand Universities". Advances in Developing Human Resources. 14 (1): 28–44. doi:10.1177/1523422311428747. Wikidata Q124397834.
- Erica Wilson; Candice Harris; Small, Jennie (2008). "Furthering Critical Approaches in Tourism and Hospitality Studies: Perspectives from Australia and New Zealand". Journal of Hospitality and Tourism Management. 15 (1): 15–18. doi:10.1375/jhtm.15.15. Wikidata Q59342753.
- Candice Harris; Helen Tregidga (2012). "HR managers and environmental sustainability: strategic leaders or passive observers?". International Journal of Human Resource Management. 23 (2): 236–254. doi:10.1080/09585192.2011.561221. Wikidata Q124397835.
- Shelagh K. Mooney; Candice Harris; Irene Ryan (2016). "Long hospitality careers – a contradiction in terms?". International Journal of Contemporary Hospitality Management. 28 (11): 2589–2608. doi:10.1108/ijchm-04-2015-0206. Wikidata Q124397836.
- Jennie Small; Candice Harris (2014). "Crying babies on planes: Aeromobility and parenting". Annals of Tourism Research. 48: 27–41. doi:10.1016/j.annals.2014.04.009. Wikidata Q59342744.
