= Te Paepae o Aotea (school) =

Location
- 13 Camberwell Road, Hāwera; New Zealand; 39.5853°S 174.2744°E

Information
- Type: State co-educational secondary, years 7–13
- Motto: Māori: Kia eke atu ki Taupaenui o te tangata (People reaching their full potential)
- Opened: 2023
- Principal: Rachel Williams
- Socio-economic decile: 5M

Te Paepae o Aotea is secondary school in the New Zealand town of Hāwera. The school opened in 2023 following the merger of Hāwera High School, which operated from 1901 until 2022, and Hāwera Intermediate. A coeducational state school, Te Paepae o Aotea caters to students in years 7 to 13.

== History ==
The school's history began as a primary school in 1875, which was reformed as a district high school in 1901. In 1919, the school was again changed, this time as a technical school, with an opening roll of 180 students. The school moved from its original site in Princes Street to a new base in Camberwell Road two years later. The school had a roll of around 400 by the outbreak of World War II. The roll continued to grow in the post-war years, reaching a peak of over 1000 in the early 1970s.

In late 2021, it was announced that Hāwera High School and Hāwera Intermediate would close, and a new, Years 7–13, school would open in 2023. The new school was named Te Paepae o Aotea, a name gifted by local iwi Ngāti Ruanui and Ngāruahine. The school's roll is 867 as of July 2026.

== Notable students ==
- Aroha Awarau, playwright and journalist
- Michael Bent (born 1986), Rugby Union Player, International Rugby Player for Ireland
- Ian Clarke (1931–1997), All Black and rugby administrator
- Enid Evans (1914–2011), chief librarian at the Auckland War Memorial Museum Library
- Ben Hurley, stand-up comedian
- Issac Luke (born 1987), rugby league player
- Ronald Hugh Morrieson (1922–1972), author
- Margaret Nielsen (1933–2023), pianist and music teacher
- William Sheat (1899–1982), member of parliament
- Hiwi Tauroa (1927–2018), rugby union player and Race Relations Conciliator
- Lene Westgaard-Halle (born 1979), politician, member of the Norwegian Parliament
- Adine Wilson (née Harper, born 1979), Silver Fern
