= Katherine Ravenswood =

New Zealand professor of industrial relations

- Occupation: researcher

Academic background
- Education: Auckland University of Technology
- Alma mater: Auckland University of Technology
- Thesis: Productivity, participation and employee wellbeing in the Residential Aged Care Sector (2011)
- Doctoral advisor: Ray Markey, Candice Harris

Academic work
- Institutions: Auckland University of Technology

Katherine Ravenswood is a New Zealand professor of industrial relations and leads the Care/Work Research Group at Auckland University of Technology (AUT). She works on the interactions of power, gender and ethnicity in workplace relationships between employers and employees.

== Academic career ==
Ravenswood's early interests were in philosophy and medieval literature, but she became interested in industrial relations during her study for an honours degree in business at AUT. Ravenswood completed a PhD titled Productivity, participation and employee wellbeing in the Residential Aged Care Sector at AUT in 2011. Her advisors were Candice Harris and Ray Markey. Ravenswood was promoted to full professor in 2023.

Ravenswood leads the Care/Work Research Group at Auckland University of Technology. She worked with Julie Douglas on assessing the impact on workers of the 2017 Pay Equity Settlement. They found that despite the increase in wages for carers, meant to address historic inequities, some people were less well-off after the settlement as their hours were reduced, possibly due to lack of funding in the sector.

When legislation to ensure reporting of the gender pay gap was announced, Ravenswood commented that the overall gap of 8% was hiding larger inequities in certain workforces, and in some ethnic groups. She said "I think [compulsory pay reporting] will normalize an understanding that there is discrimination on the basis of gender and hopefully whichever government is in will also make sure it's on the basis of ethnicity as well. Then the facts will be there and it won't be controversial, because it's something everyone knows and reports."

Ravenswood has been involved in policy development for New Zealand's care workforce and is part of the New Zealand Work Research Institute leadership team.

== Selected works ==
- Katherine Ravenswood (2023). "'Try, Learn, Adjust': it's time to bring workers into disability support policy". Policy Quarterly (in Spanish). 19 (1): 27–34. doi:10.26686/pq.v19i1.8102. Wikidata Q123220460.
- Katherine Ravenswood (2021). "Greening work–life balance: Connecting work, caring and the environment". Industrial Relations Journal. 53 (1): 3–18. doi:10.1111/irj.12351. Wikidata Q123220461.
- O'Kane, Paula; Katherine Ravenswood; Julie Douglas; Fiona Edgar; Parker, Jane (2021). "Doing things differently: IR practice and research beyond 2020". Labour & Industry. 31 (1): 1–6. doi:10.1080/10301763.2021.1911041. Wikidata Q123220462.
- Katherine Ravenswood; Sarah Kaine (2015). "The role of government in influencing labour conditions through the procurement of services: Some political challenges". Journal of Industrial Relations. 57 (4): 544–562. doi:10.1177/0022185615582238. Wikidata Q123220814.
- Harris, Candice; Katherine Ravenswood; Myers, Barbara (2013). "Glass slippers, Holy Grails and Ivory Towers: gender and advancement in academia". Labour & Industry. 23 (3): 231–244. doi:10.1080/10301763.2013.839084. Wikidata Q123220815.
- Marilyn Clarke; Katherine Ravenswood (2019). "Constructing a career identity in the aged care sector: overcoming the "taint" of dirty work". Personnel Review. 48 (1): 76–97. doi:10.1108/pr-08-2017-0244. Wikidata Q123220799.
- Katherine Ravenswood; Markey, Ray (2011). "The Role of Unions in Achieving a Family-friendly Workplace". Journal of Industrial Relations. 53 (4): 486–503. doi:10.1177/0022185611409113. Wikidata Q123220821.
