= Joan E. Taylor =

New Zealand writer and historian

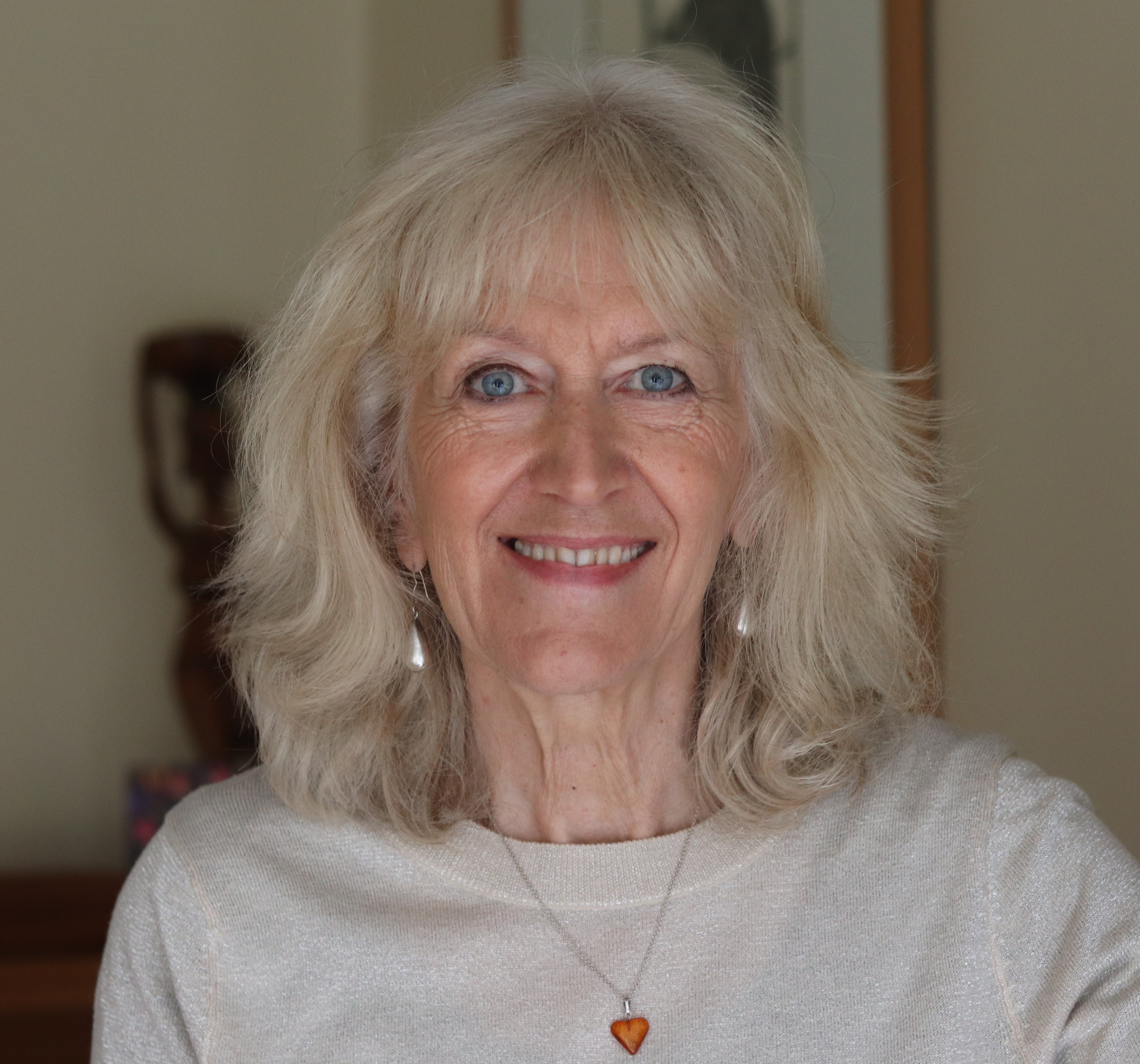
- Taylor in 2024
- Born: Joan Elizabeth Taylor; 13 September 1958 (age 68); Horsell, Surrey, England
- Education: Auckland University (BA); University of Otago (MDiv); Edinburgh University (PhD)
- Occupation: Historian

Joan Elizabeth Taylor (born 13 September 1958) is a New Zealand historian of ancient religion, particularly Jesus, the Bible, early Christianity, the Dead Sea Scrolls, and Second Temple Judaism, with special expertise in archaeology, and women's and gender studies. Taylor is Professor Emerita of Christian Origins and Second Temple Judaism at King's College, London and Honorary Professor at Australian Catholic University in Melbourne, Australia. She identifies as a Quaker.

== Early life and education ==
Joan Elizabeth Taylor was born in Horsell, Surrey, England, on 13 September 1958. Her ancestry is English and Danish. In 1967, her family emigrated to New Zealand, where she grew up, attending school in Newlands and Lower Hutt.

After a BA degree at Auckland University, New Zealand, she completed a three-year postgraduate degree in Divinity at the University of Otago, and then went to the British School of Archaeology in Jerusalem (Kenyon Institute) as Annual Scholar in 1986. She undertook a PhD in early Christian archaeology and Jewish-Christianity at New College, Edinburgh University, as a Commonwealth Scholar.

== Career ==
In 1990, she accompanied her husband, human rights expert Paul Hunt, to Geneva and then to Gambia, returning to Aotearoa New Zealand in 1992. She was lecturer, subsequently senior lecturer, at the University of Waikato, in the departments of both Religious Studies and History.

In 1995 she won an Irene Levi-Sala prize in archaeology for the book version of her PhD thesis, Christians and the Holy Places (Oxford: Clarendon, 1993, rev. 2003). In 1996-7 she was Visiting Lecturer and Research Associate in Women's Studies in New Testament at Harvard Divinity School, a position she held in association with a Fulbright Award. She joined the staff of King's College London, Department of Theology and Religious Studies, in 2009, and in 2012 became Professor of Christian Origins and Second Temple Judaism, retiring at the end of 2024 to become Emerita. She is also (from 2022) Honorary Professor at the Centre of Religion and Critical Enquiry, Australian Catholic University in Melbourne.

== Research ==
=== The Therapeutae ===
Taylor travelled to Egypt in 1999 to research the area surrounding Lake Mareotis where the Therapeutae lived according to Philo of Alexandria. Later, she published her archaeological findings beside her textual analysis of Philo's De Vita Contemplativa in her book Jewish Women Philosophers of First-Century Alexandria: Philo's 'Therapeutae' Reconsidered. Taylor challenged the belief that the Therapeutae were an Essenic community and showed that the Mareotic community belonged to the Alexandrian milieu with its Jewish Diaspora community. She argued that the best historical context to Philo's Contemp. is the bitter hostilities between the Jews and the Greeks of Alexandria. She also managed to discover the location of the community at a low hill, in the ridge which was called "the Strip." Her findings were welcomed in scholarship. Pieter W. van der Horst found her discovery and analysis thorough and convincing, which makes a shift in our understanding of the context of this group. The prominent Second Temple scholar John J. Collins also accepted the "richly documented" conclusions of Taylor. Yet, he shared van der Horst's reluctance to agree with Taylor's suggestion that the Therapeutae were associated with the extreme allegorizers in Philo's (Migr.Ab. 89-93) due to Philo's sympathy toward the Therapeutae. Her study also proposed a new view of first century Jewish women since the Therapeutrides (Θεραπευτρίδες) were highly educated philosophers. This view further supported the contribution of feminist observations to historical investigation, according to Annewies van den Hoek of Harvard Divinity School.

Taylor wrote a substantial commentary on the De Vita Contemplativa (Brill, 2021), continuing the work of David Hay. This is highly commended as 'without doubt the best commentary ever written on this text'.

=== John the Baptist ===
Taylor's work on John the Baptist situated John within the context of Second Temple Judaism and argued that his baptism should be understood in line with forms of immersion for ritual purity known at the time. John's baptism rid the body of ritual impurity after the inner being had been cleansed by repentance, action and forgiveness, preparing people for the eschatological arrival of a coming figure. In her careful analysis of issues surrounding the traditions of the Baptist like purification, she showed that John's baptism should not be understood through the duality of outer symbolism and inner repentance, as John Dominic Crossan stated earlier, but outer and inner purity. The significance of the book, as Bruce Chilton puts it, is in treating the tradition of the Baptist in its own historical context, not under the shadow of New Testament Christology. Her analysis instilled scholarly debates of the relationship between Qumran and John the Baptist as well as formative Christianity with a spectrum of opinions over her findings.

=== Archaeology ===
Since her PhD and early work on the archaeology of Christian holy sites, Taylor has ranged from studying the archaeology of the goddess Asherah to questions of archaeology and historical geography (in Eusebius' Onomasticon and the Gospels, and to the excavations of Qumran and the Qumran Caves, particularly contributing to discussion of the relationship between literary and archaeological evidence for understanding the past (in On Pliny, the Essene Location and Kh. Qumran).

=== Jesus and Brian ===
Taylor organised an international conference focusing on the new hermeneutic of reception exegesis, by considering the historical Jesus through the lens of Monty Python's Life of Brian in June 2014, involving the participation of John Cleese and Terry Jones, who were interviewed as part of the event. The papers are published in a book edited by Taylor, Jesus and Brian: Exploring the Historical Jesus and his Times via Monty Python's Life of Brian.

=== What Did Jesus Look Like? ===
Taylor's book What Did Jesus Look Like? (Bloomsbury PublishingT&T Clark, 2018) received considerable media interest on its release. In seeking to understand the appearance of Jesus, Taylor scoured western art and relics, memories and traditions, and ultimately relied on early texts and archaeology to create a visualisation of Jesus that she considered more authentic. In this reconstruction, she stresses that Jesus was not only a Jewish man of Middle Eastern appearance, with 'olive-brown skin', but probably quite short-haired. He wore very basic clothing and was 'scruffy', and his appearance mattered in terms of his message.

=== The Women Disciples of Jesus ===
With Helen Bond, Taylor initiated a project that culminated in the 2018 documentary 'Jesus Female Disciples: The New Evidence', made by Minerva Productions (Jean-Claude Bragard), commissioned by UK's Channel 4, directed and produced by Anna Cox. After receiving high viewing figures and acclaim from reviewers, as a 'healthy corrective to the myths we take for gospel' this has been screened globally in multiple languages. Taylor and Bond then went on to write a popular book Women Remembered: Jesus' Female Disciples (Hachette, 2022), expanding on their studies, with associated interview podcasts, including for the Spectator.

== Literature ==
Taylor is also a writer of narrative history, novels and poetry (sometimes using her mother's maiden name of Norlev). Her first novel, Conversations with Mr. Prain, was published by Melville House Publishing in Brooklyn, New York, and Hardie Grant in Melbourne, in 2006, and republished by Melville House. Her second novel, Kissing Bowie, was published by Seventh Rainbow, London, in 2013. In 2016 her historical novel Napoleon's Willow appeared. A review in the New Zealand Herald called it 'a feverishly colourful story' and noted her historian's eye: 'The reader can be impressed by the perfect chronology of the events, but layering on a cast of factual and fictitious characters relies on impeccable social research and imagination.'

== Books ==
=== Author ===
- Christians and the Holy Places: The Myth of Jewish Christian Origins (Oxford: Clarendon, 1993; rev. ed. 2003).
- with Shimon Gibson, Beneath the Church of the Holy Sepulchre: The Archaeology and Early History of Traditional Golgotha (London: Palestine Exploration Fund*, 1994).
- The Immerser: John the Baptist within Second Temple Judaism (Grand Rapids, Mich.: Eerdmans, 1997; also published as John the Baptist: A Historical Study (London: SPCK, 1997).
- Jewish Women Philosophers of First-Century Alexandria - Philo's 'Therapeutae' Reconsidered (Oxford: Oxford University Press, 2003; paperback edition 2006).
- The Englishman, the Moor and the Holy City: The True Adventures of an Elizabethan Traveller (Stroud: Tempus/History Press, 2006).
- The Essenes, the Scrolls and the Dead Sea (Oxford: Oxford University Press, 2012).
- What Did Jesus Look Like? (Bloomsbury T&T Clark, 2018).
- with David Hay, Philo of Alexandria: On the Contemplative Life (Philo of Alexandria Commentary Series, Leiden: Brill, 2021).
- with Helen Bond, Women Remembered: Jesus' Female Disciples (Hodder & Stoughton, 2022).
- Boy Jesus: Growing Up Judean in Turbulent Times (London: SPCK/Grand Rapids: Zondervan, 2025); Italian edition: La vera storia de Gesu Bambino (Sonda, 2025).

=== Editor and contributor ===
- Palestine in the Fourth Century. The Onomasticon by Eusebius of Caesarea, introduced and edited by Joan E. Taylor, translated by Greville Freeman-Grenville, and indexed by Rupert Chapman III (Jerusalem: Carta, 2003).
- (annotator and editor), Cecilie Hertz, Livserindringer - Memories of My Life: A Woman's Life in 19th-Century Denmark, transl. by Birgit Norlev Taylor (New York/Lampeter: Edwin Mellen, 2009).
- (editor), The Body in Biblical, Christian and Jewish Texts (London: T&T Clark Bloomsbury,* 2014).
- (editor). Jesus and Brian: Exploring the Historical Jesus and his Times via Monty Python's Life of Brian (London: T&T Clark Bloomsbury, 2015).
- (editor) with Ilaria Ramelli. Patterns of Women's Leadership in Early Christianity (Oxford: OUP, 2021)

=== Literary work ===
- (author, novel) Conversations with Mr. Prain (New Jersey: Melville House Publishing,* 2006; Melbourne: Hardie Grant, 2006); reissued, revised with a new cover and reading group questions, 2011.
- kissing Bowie (novel) (London: Seventh Rainbow, 2013).
- Napoleon's Willow: A Story of Akaroa (Auckland: RSVP Eunoia, 2016).
