= Jeremy Pope (activist) =

New Zealand activist and writer

Jeremy Pope ONZM

Human Rights Commissioner of New Zealand
- In office 31 January 2008 – 29 August 2012
- Prime Minister: Helen Clark; John Key

Personal details
- Born: 9 October 1938 Wellington, New Zealand
- Died: 29 August 2012 (aged 73) Wellington, New Zealand
- Occupation: Activist, writer

Jeremy Pope, ONZM (9 October 1938 – 29 August 2012) was a New Zealand activist and writer. He co-founded Transparency International in 1993 and later Tiri in 2003. Tiri is a Maori word which means lifting the taboos for the protection of society.

At Transparency International, Pope co-created Corruption Perceptions Index (CPI) which identified best and worst practices related to corruption and ranked countries accordingly. He wrote the organization's "manual" on preventing corruption entitled Confronting Corruption: The Elements of a National Integrity System, which was translated into more than 20 different languages.

A barrister in New Zealand and England, Pope worked for 17 years as legal counsel and director of the Commonwealth Secretariat's Legal Division. He was secretary to the Commonwealth Observer Group that oversaw Zimbabwe's independence elections in 1980 and was a member of the Commonwealth Group of Eminent Persons that visited South Africa in 1986 and triggered the release of Nelson Mandela.

Pope wrote guide books about New Zealand in the early 1970s and 1980s with his wife, Diana Pope. During the 1970s he was active with the "Save Manapouri" environmental movement in New Zealand. He was for many years editor of the New Zealand Law Journal and the Commonwealth Law Bulletin.

Pope said he moved to London in the 1976 because of his displeasure with the administration of New Zealand Prime Minister Rob Muldoon. In 1982 he became the founding trustee of Interights, an international legal human rights NGO. Pope returned to New Zealand in 2005.

In 2007, he was made an Officer of the New Zealand Order of Merit for "services to international affairs." He served as a Commissioner on the New Zealand Human Rights Commission (Te Kāhui Tika Tangata) from 31 January 2008 until his death in 2012.
