= Nikola Kasabov =

Bulgarian AI researcher (born 1948)

Nikola Kirilov Kasabov
- Born: August 12, 1948 (age 78); Svishtov, Bulgaria
- Occupations: Computer scientist, academic and author
- Spouse: Diana Kassabova (m. 1971)
- Children: 2

Academic background
- Education: MSc., Electrical engineering Postgrad Diploma., Applied Mathematics; PhD., Mathematical Sciences
- Alma mater: Technical University, Sofia, Bulgaria

Academic work
- Institutions: Auckland University of Technology; Ulster University; Bulgarian Academy of Sciences; University of Otago; Technical University of Sofia

Nikola Kirilov Kasabov also known as Nikola Kirilov Kassabov (Bulgarian: Никола Кирилов Касабов) is a Bulgarian and New Zealand computer scientist, academic and author. He is a professor emeritus of knowledge engineering at Auckland University of Technology, founding director of the Knowledge Engineering and Discovery Research Institute (KEDRI), George Moore Chair of Data Analytics at Ulster University, as well as visiting professor at both the Institute for Information and Communication Technologies (IICT) at the Bulgarian Academy of Sciences and Dalian University in China.

He is also the founder and director of Knowledge Engineering Consulting Ltd.

Overall Kasabov's research research has been inspired by Nature. He originated novel brain-inspired-, gene-inspired and quantum inspired information methods and systems with applications for computational intelligence, neuro-computing, bioinformatics, neuroinformatics, speech and image processing, data mining, knowledge representation and knowledge discovery. He has published research articles and books such as Foundations of Neural Networks, Fuzzy Systems, and Knowledge Engineering and Evolving Connectionist Systems: The Knowledge Engineering Approach.

He is the recipient of multiple best paper awards along with the Asia Pacific Neural Network Assembly (APNNA) Excellent Service Award (2005), the Bayer Science Innovator Award (2007), the International Neural Network Society (INNS) Gabor Award (2012), the APNNA Outstanding Achievements Award (2012), the INNS Ada Lovelace Meritorious Service Award (2018), and the Research.com Computer Science in New Zealand Leader Award (2022 and 2023).

Kasabov is a life fellow of the Institute of Electrical and Electronics Engineers (IEEE), and a fellow of the Royal Society of New Zealand, the INNS College of Fellows, the Asia-Pacific Artificial Intelligence Association (AAIA), as well as the Institute of IT Professionals. He is the co-founder and co-editor-in-chief of Evolving Systems and an editor of the Springer Series on Bio-/Neuro Systems.

== Education ==
Kasabov earned an MSc in electrical engineering with a specialization in computer science in 1971, receiving his post-graduate diploma in applied mathematics in 1972 and a PhD in mathematical sciences in 1975, all from the Technical University, Sofia. In 2018, he was awarded a Doctor Honoris Causa from Obuda University, Budapest.

== Career ==
Kasabov began his academic career at the Technical University, Sofia, initially as a research fellow in the Department of Computer Science, later becoming a lecturer in 1978 and associate professor in 1988. In 1989, he joined the University of Essex Department of Computer Science as a research fellow and senior lecturer. Subsequently, he assumed the role of senior lecturer at the University of Otago Department of Information Science, where he was appointed professor and personal chair from 1999 to 2002. He has been serving as a professor of knowledge engineering at Auckland University of Technology since 2002, as well as a visiting professor at both the Institute for Information and Communication Technologies (IICT) at the Bulgarian Academy of Sciences and Dalian University in China since 2022.

In 2001, Kasabov founded Knowledge Engineering Consulting. He was President of the APNNA in 2007–2008 and of the INNS in 2009 and 2010, concurrently serving as Vice President of the INNS in 2006 President-Elect in 2008 and as a Governor Board Member from 2011 to 2017. In 2019, he assumed for the second time, the presidency of the APNNA and has been a Founding Member of the Governing Board since 1993.

== Research ==
Inspired by nature, Kasabov has contributed to the field of computer science by orginating and conducting research on evolving connectionist systems (ECOS), computational neuro-genetic modelling, neuro-quantum systems and brain-inspired spiking neural network architecture NeuCube.

He originated theories and computational frameworks of evolving spatio-temporal associative memories, hybrid SNN-quantum systems, personalized modelling of multimodal data along with other contributions. In he proposed a new formula wwkNN to select the k-nearest neighbors of a given vector from a data set of similar vectors. Along with the distance between the variables, he introduced a parameter/weight in regard to the importance of the variables, that led to a significant improvement of accuracy across classification and regression models for machine learning.

== Works ==
Kasabov began his research as a PhD student, by introducing reconfigurable finite automata models based on algebraic transformations. He and his colleague Georgi Bijev developed algorithms for compact representation of algebraic permutations and transformations as a composition of basic transformations. After that, Kasabov proposed several methods for knowledge-based neural networks. Hе originated the integration of neural networks (connectionist models) with production systems (rule-based systems) and fuzzy logic to create fuzzy expert systems.

Kasabov has published books on knowledge engineering and neural networks. His seminal work Foundations of Neural Networks, Fuzzy Systems, and Knowledge Engineering integrated neural networks, fuzzy systems, and symbolic AI for AI solutions in various fields, which led to the development of the ECOS theoretical framework. He further discussed its potential applications in the monograph, Evolving Connectionist Systems: The Knowledge Engineering Approach, such as the discovery of diagnostic markers for early detection of cancer. Later on, in 2019, he authored a monograph Time-Space, Spiking Neural Networks and Brain-Inspired Artificial Intelligence, exploring spiking neural networks (SNN), looking into classical theory, while also introducing brain-inspired AI (BI-AI) systems and their applications across various domains.

=== Evolving connectionist systems ===
Kasabov has introduced and researched ECOS throughout his career. He implemented the ECOS framework by introducing the Dynamic Evolving Neuro-Fuzzy Inference System (DENFIS), an online learning neuro-fuzzy method and the Evolving Fuzzy Neural Network (EFuNN), a model for online supervised/unsupervised learning and fuzzy rule extraction, both used in the software development environment NeuCom, earning him several patents.

=== Spiking neural networks and the brain-inspired NeuCube architecture ===
Kasabov's work on spiking neural networks (SNN) led to the development of new methodologies like the NeuCube theoretical framework for brain-inspired computation. He extended ECOS principles to comprehend spatio-temporal brain data via spike representation, featuring a 3D SNN structure trained with brain-inspired rules, facilitating interpretable connectivity models and offering fast, low-power processing ideal for real-time applications like human prosthetic control. He also presented deSNN, a dynamic evolving spiking neural network method, for incremental learning of spatio-temporal streaming data, used in the NeuCube system, and employed the NeuCube brain-inspired SNN architecture for moving object recognition, using dynamic vision sensors (DVS) to convert object data into spikes and achieving superior accuracy on benchmark data. Furthermore, alongside colleagues, he introduced SPAN (Spike Pattern Association Neurons) algorithms to train spiking neurons for precise spike sequence generation in response to specific input patterns.

In a paper that received the 2016 Neural Networks Best Paper Award, Kasabov proposed novel algorithms for deep learning of spatio-temporal data. He devised a personalized modeling method using SNN, which was later patented, integrating static and dynamic data, demonstrated in air pollution and drug addiction treatment prediction, outperforming other machine learning methods with a 94% accuracy. Additionally, he developed personalized modeling methods with brain-inspired SNN, achieving accurate prediction in EEG data and high predictive accuracy for dementia and AD onset using MRI longitudinal data, as well as proposed an original method for fMRI data learning and visualization with brain-inspired SNN.

With Simei Gomes Wysoski and Lubica Benuskova, Kasabov developed an SNN method integrating audio and visual data, surpassing other methods in decision-making tasks. He presented a quantum interpretation of spikes and a probabilistic spiking neuron model, alongside a quantum-inspired evolutionary optimization method for SNN, enabling faster convergence of solutions. His team also pioneered SNN models for understanding brain processes through ERP data, predicting treatment responses in schizophrenic patients, and learning EEG data for building brain-computer interfaces, by introducing SNN integration of time, space, and orientation data with oiSTDP.

=== Expanded Research and Projects ===
In recent years, Kasabov has continued to advance brain-inspired artificial intelligence through the development and application of spiking neural network frameworks that extend his earlier work on evolving connectionist systems (ECOS).

His research group at the Knowledge Engineering and Discovery Research Institute (KEDRI) at Auckland University of Technology is actively developing NeuCube-based systems for real-time multisensory modelling and predictive data analysis, enabling applications across environmental monitoring, health, and complex sensor networks.

Kasabov’s research has also contributed to the integration of quantum-inspired elements with innovation in combining neural and quantum computation principles.

A further recent contribution attributed to Kasabov involves the eXCube2 framework, abrain-inspired explainable AI model based on NeuCube for emotion recognition from audio, visual, and multimodal data.

=== Ongoing Interdisciplinary Work ===
Under Kasabov’s leadership, KEDRI conducts multidisciplinary research organised into thematic groups that extend his foundational theories in evolving connectionist systems and spiking neural networks to areas including signal processing, pattern recognition, brain data analysis (EEG, fMRI), bioinformatics and health informatics, and creativity and multimedia modelling. These projects explore predictive modelling from audio-visual and brain data, decision-making processes, and human-computer interaction, while collaborating with research partners in China, Europe, and elsewhere.

He has further applied the originated by him evolving spatio-temporal associative memories for the development of AI systems that manifest elements of machine consciousness.

=== Influence and Collaborations ===
Kasabov’s work on spiking neural network architectures such as NeuCube has been cited in comprehensive reviews of spiking neural networks for multimodal neuroimaging, where NeuCube’s contributions are positioned within broader trends in explainable AI and brain-inspired computation.

Additionally, his influence extends through international collaborations, with co-authored work demonstrating transfer learning of fuzzy spatio-temporal rules using NeuCube for EEG data, reflecting both incremental learning and the extraction of interpretable knowledge rules from complex data a topic that continues to attract research interest globally.

=== Applied and Commercial Dimensions ===
Beyond academic publications, Kasabov’s innovations have practical and commercial implications. The NeuCube framework and ECOS-based methods have been implemented in development environments and used for diverse applications from diagnostic marker discovery in cancer and neurological conditions to predictive modelling of environmental and health outcomes illustrating the translational impact of his theoretical work in artificial intelligence.

His company KECL has been involved in applied research in bioinformatics, neuroinformatics and machine consciousness.

== Awards and honors ==
- 2005 – Excellent Service Award, APNNA
- 2007 – Bayer Science Innovator Award
- 2012 – Outstanding Achievements Award, APNNA
- 2012 – Dennis Gabor Award, INNS
- 2017 – Ada Lovelace Meritorious Service Award
- 2022 – Life Fellow, IEEE
- 2022, 2023 – Computer Science in New Zealand Leader Award, Research.com

== Bibliography ==
=== Selected books ===
- Foundations of Neural Networks, Fuzzy Systems, and Knowledge Engineering (1996) ISBN 978-0262112123
- Evolving Connectionist Systems: The Knowledge Engineering Approach (2007) ISBN 978-1846283451
- Computational Neuro-genetic Modelling (2007) ISBN 978-0387483535
- Artificial Neural Networks Methods and Applications in Bio-/Neuroinformatics (2015) ISBN 978-3319349503
- Time-Space, Spiking Neural Networks and Brain-Inspired Artificial Intelligence (2019) ISBN 978-3662577134

=== Selected articles ===
- Kim, J., & Kasabov, N. (1999). HyFIS: adaptive neuro-fuzzy inference systems and their application to nonlinear dynamical systems. Neural networks, 12(9), 1301–1319.
- Kasabov, N. (2001). Evolving fuzzy neural networks for supervised/unsupervised online knowledge-based learning. IEEE Transactions on Systems, Man, and Cybernetics, Part B (Cybernetics), 31(6), 902–918.
- Kasabov, N. K., & Song, Q. (2002). DENFIS: dynamic evolving neural-fuzzy inference system and its application for time-series prediction. IEEE transactions on Fuzzy Systems, 10(2), 144–154.
- Pang, S., Ozawa, S., & Kasabov, N. (2005). Incremental linear discriminant analysis for classification of data streams. IEEE transactions on Systems, Man, and Cybernetics, part B (Cybernetics), 35(5), 905–914.
- Kasabov, N. K. (2014). NeuCube: A spiking neural network architecture for mapping, learning and understanding of spatio-temporal brain data. Neural Networks, 52, 62–76.
- Kasabov, N. K., Tan, Y., Doborjeh, M., Tu, E., Yang, J., Goh, W., & Lee, J. (2023). Transfer Learning of Fuzzy Spatio-Temporal Rules in a Brain-Inspired Spiking Neural Network Architecture: A Case Study on Spatio-Temporal Brain Data. IEEE Transactions on Fuzzy Systems, 31(12), 4542–4552.
