= Karanina Sumeo =

Samoan-New Zealand civil servant

Saunoamaali’i Karanina Sumeo is a Samoan-New Zealand civil servant. She was Equal Employment Opportunities Commissioner for the New Zealand Human Rights Commission from 2018 to 2024.

== Life ==
Sumeo was born in Vailima, Upolu, Samoa and emigrated to New Zealand with her family when she was 10. She completed a bachelor of science degree at the University of Auckland and a master's degree in social policy at Massey University. She also holds a PhD in public policy from Auckland University of Technology, supervised by Marilyn Waring and Peggy Fairbairn-Dunlop.

Sumeo held positions with Oranga Tamariki, the Ministry of Social Development, Ministry of Pacific Island Affairs, Tertiary Education Commission, and the Auckland District Health Board prior to her appointment to the Human Rights Commission.

In 2026, Sumeo was the Pacific adviser to the People’s Select Committee on Pay Equity, following the government rolling back the pay equity system.
