= Claire McLachlan =

New Zealand teaching academic

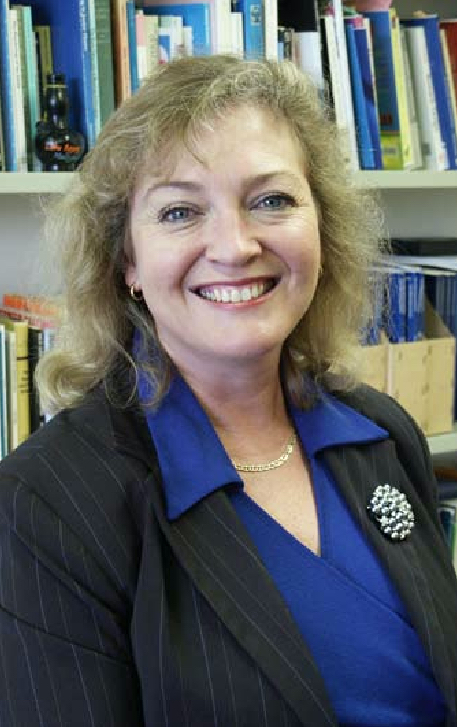
- Other name: Claire Jane McLachlan
- Education: Massey University
- Scientific career
- Fields: early childhood education, early literacy
- Workplaces: University of Auckland, Auckland University of Technology, Massey University, Waikato University, Federation University Australia
- Thesis: Emergent literacy in New Zealand kindergartens : an examination of policy and practices (1996)

Claire Jane McLachlan (sometimes McLachlan-Smith) is a New Zealand academic and senior leader. She is currently Pro-Vice Chancellor, Education at the University of Waikato, New Zealand, and was previously Executive Dean, Institute of Education, Arts and Community at Federation University Australia. Her speciality is early-childhood literacy.

== Career ==
McLachlan did a M.A (Hons, 1st class) by thesis at Massey entitled 'Experience as a mother of a "crying baby": a single collaborative case study' completed in 1991, and then a PhD 'Emergent literacy in New Zealand kindergartens : an examination of policy and practices' in 1996. Between 2000 and 2006 she worked in Auckland at the University of Auckland and Auckland University of Technology before returning to Massey University, where she rose to full professor in 2013. She then moved to Waikato University as Professor and Head of Te Hononga School of Curriculum and Pedagogy.. Following an overseas appointment as professor and Executive Dean of the Institute of Education, Arts and Community at Federation University Australia., she returned to New Zealand to take up the position of Pro-Vice Chancellor, Education at the University of Waikato, New Zealand.

Claire has published 10 books, has over 200 research outputs, and has received over $7 million in research, consultancy and curriculum development funding. She has also supervised over 60 HDR students, including 11 doctoral completions to date. Her primary field of research is early childhood education, and her platform of research focusses on literacy, physical activity, curriculum, pedagogy, assessment, and evaluation. In addition, Claire has undertaken research and evaluation for the Department of Education in Victoria and for three government Ministries in New Zealand: Education, Health, and Social Development; as well as for government agencies such as the Alcohol Advisory Council and Sport New Zealand. Internationally, she has provided consultancy for the Semarang State University (UNNES) in Central Java, Indonesia and the New Zealand Ministry of Foreign Affairs for education in Tokelau.

== Selected works ==
- Makin, Laurie, Criss Jones-Diaz, and Claire McLachlan, eds. Literacies in childhood: Changing views, challenging practice. Elsevier Australia, 2007.
- McLachlan, Claire, Marilyn Fleer, and Susan Edwards. Early childhood curriculum: Planning, assessment, and implementation. Cambridge University Press, 2013.
- McLachlan, Claire, Lucila Carvalho, Nicky de Lautour, and Koshila Kumar. "Literacy in early childhood settings in New Zealand: An examination of teachers' beliefs and practices." Australian Journal of Early Childhood 31, no. 2 (2006): 31–42.
- McLachlan, Claire. "An analysis of New Zealand's changing history, policies and approaches to early childhood education." Australasian Journal of Early Childhood 36, no. 3 (2011): 36.
