= Hiwi Tauroa =

New Zealand rugby player (1927–2018)

Hiwi Tauroa CMG JP
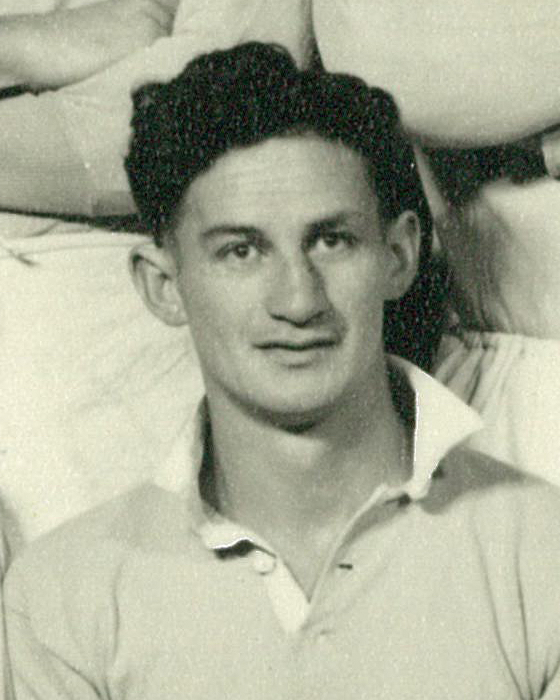
- Tauroa in 1950

3rd Race Relations Conciliator
- In office 1980–1986
- Preceded by: Harry Dansey
- Succeeded by: Wally Hirsh

Personal details
- Born: Edward Te Rangihiwinui Tauroa; 29 May 1927 Okaiawa, New Zealand
- Died: 11 December 2018 (aged 91) Whangaroa, New Zealand
- Spouse: Patricia Wilson (m. 1958)
- Children: 6
- Education: Wesley College; Hawera Technical High School
- Alma mater: Massey Agricultural College; Auckland University College
- Occupation: Schoolteacher

Rugby union career
- Position: Fullback
Provincial / State sides
Years	Team	Apps	(Points)
- Manawatu
-	Taranaki		
International career
Years	Team	Apps	(Points)
1951	NZ Universities		
1951–1954	New Zealand Māori		
Coaching career
- Years: Team
- 1974–1979: Counties

Edward Te Rangihiwinui Tauroa CMG JP (29 May 1927 – 11 December 2018), known as Hiwi Tauroa, was a New Zealand rugby union player and coach, school principal, and civil servant of Māori descent.

== Early life ==
Tauroa, who was of Ngāpuhi descent, was born in Okaiawa, near Hāwera in Taranaki in 1927, the son of a Methodist minister. His parents moved frequently, and Tauroa began his school life at Waima in the Hokianga. From there he went to Hawera Technical High School, where he won a scholarship to study at Massey University College.

== Teaching ==
Through tertiary study at both Auckland and Massey Agricultural College, Tauroa graduated in 1952 with a Bachelor of Agricultural Science, before beginning papers for a Diploma in Education. After graduating he taught at various schools throughout the North Island.

Tauroa served as the principal of Wesley College from 1968, before becoming the principal of Tuakau College in 1974, a post he held until 1979. He was the first Māori to be appointed head of a secondary school.

== Rugby union ==
Tauroa was originally best known for his rugby union career, and played for New Zealand Māori from 1951 to 1954. Selected while at Massey Agricultural College, Tauroa toured Australia with the NZ Universities team in 1951 coached by Ron Bush, an uncle of photographer Peter Bush. The team had two wins against an Australian Universities side as well as winning their six minor fixtures. Tauroa continued his interest in rugby in later life, becoming coach of the Counties Rugby Union in the 1970s, and leading them to the National Provincial Championship title in 1979.

== Public and political life ==
In 1979, Tauroa was appointed New Zealand's Race Relations Conciliator. In this capacity, he promoted the concept of educating Pākehā in traditional Māori customs and culture, instigating marae courses for state and private corporations and encouraging large businesses to adopt a more multicultural mindset. During his time as Race Relations Conciliator, New Zealand faced major civil unrest caused by the 1981 Springbok Tour. Tauroa was heavily involved in New Zealand's anti-apartheid campaign during this time. Tauroa was also heavily involved in fostering links between Māori and China, establishing with Rewi Alley the New Zealand–China Māori Friendship Association in 1984.

Tauroa retired in 1985, moving to the small Northland town of Kaeo. Here he was appointed the chair of Te Rūnanga o Whaingaroa, a position which he held until 2000. In 1986, he put himself forward for the National Party nomination in the Auckland electorate of Eden. Up against three other nominees (David Phillips, Jock Parbhu and Trevor Rogers) he was successful. At the 1987 general election he was unsuccessful in winning the seat. In 1988 he was elected to the Auckland Regional Authority for the Auckland Central ward.

Tauroa also served as chairman of Te Māngai Pāho and the New Zealand Sports Foundation, and served on the board of many educational and Māori organisations, among them the United Nations Indigenous Peoples Trust. He also authored several books on the Treaty of Waitangi and Māori culture, most notably Te Marae: A guide to customs and protocol (1986; Reed Methuen), which was co-written with his wife Patricia. Tauroa was appointed a Companion of the Order of St Michael and St George, for public services, in the 1994 New Year Honours.

== Death ==
Tauroa died on 11 December 2018 at his home in Waipuna, Whangaroa, aged 91. He was survived by Patricia (née Wilson), his wife of 60 years, and their six children, along with numerous grandchildren and great-grandchildren.
