= Gail Pacheco =

New Zealand economics academic

- Born: Gail Anne Pacheco
- Education: University of Auckland
- Scientific career
- Fields: economics
- Workplaces: Auckland University of Technology
- Thesis: Minimum wage in New Zealand : an empirical enquiry (2007)

Gail Pacheco is a New Zealand economics academic. She is currently a full professor at the Auckland University of Technology. In August 2024, Pachecho was appointed as the Human Rights Commission's equal employment opportunities commissioner.

== Academic career ==
After a 2007 PhD at titled 'Minimum wage in New Zealand: an empirical enquiry' at the University of Auckland, she moved to the Auckland University of Technology, rising to full professor.

Pacheco's work on family incomes and gender pay has been widely reported on.

== Community work ==
In August 2024, Justice Minister Paul Goldsmith appointed Pacheco as the Human Rights Commission's equal employment opportunities commissioner.

== Selected works ==
- Knechel, W. Robert, Vic Naiker, and Gail Pacheco. "Does auditor industry specialization matter? Evidence from market reaction to auditor switches." Auditing: A Journal of Practice & Theory 26, no. 1 (2007): 19–45.
- Van Der Westhuizen, De Wet, Gail Pacheco, and Don J. Webber. "Culture, participative decision making and job satisfaction." The International Journal of Human Resource Management 23, no. 13 (2012): 2661–2679.
- Fargher, Scott, Stefan Kesting, Thomas Lange, and Gail Pacheco. "Cultural heritage and job satisfaction in Eastern and Western Europe." International Journal of Manpower 29, no. 7 (2008): 630–650.
- Pacheco, Gail, Li, Chao and Cochrane, Bill, "Empirical evidence of the gender pay gap in New Zealand." Ministry for Women (2017).
- Dr Isabelle Sin, Dr Kabir Dasgupta and Professor Gail Pacheco "Parenthood and labour market outcomes" Ministry for Women (2018).
