= Ruth Ige =

Nigerian-born New Zealand painter

- Born: 1992 (age 33–34); Ifẹ, Nigeria
- Education: Auckland University of Technology
- Known for: painting

Ruth Ige (born 1992 in Ilé-Ifẹ̀, Nigeria) is a Nigerian-born painter based in Auckland, New Zealand. Her work was part of the major group exhibition Aotearoa Contemporary at Auckland Art Gallery Toi o Tāmaki in 2024. She has been part of multiple solo and group exhibitions, notably participating in several international exhibitions.

== Background ==
Ige is of Yoruba descent on her father's side and Igbo descent on her mother's side. In 2016, she graduated with a Bachelor of Visual Arts from the Auckland University of Technology. One year after graduating, in 2017 she participated in her first group exhibition at Artspace in Auckland.

== Art ==
Ige's work centers the black figure and explores blackness in relation to representation, art history, documentation, and existence. Though firmly rooted in history and the present, her paintings often delve into future imaginings. Where past, present and future collide, converse and coexist within the same space. Where the figures, roam between dimensions of history and fiction. In almost a shapeshifting manner the familiar and fantastical are constantly interchanging. She is interested in exploring the movement between two things and their coexistence: figuration and abstraction, the familiar and otherworldly, stillness and movement, beauty and pain, certainty and uncertainty, etc. Especially using secrecy and mystery as a form of empowerment in the portrayal of blackness through the constant concealing and revealing that occurs by moving between abstraction and figuration. The figures are powerfully seen, but also seem to be lovingly protected and hidden. As such, Ige aims for her works to be difficult to stereotype due to their abstract, mysterious qualities, creating narratives within her paintings that are enigmatic and unexpected. She describes her works as a love letter to the black diaspora and motherland, her paintings being a tool of healing, escape, resistance and empowerment.

Typically, Ige uses thick, gestural brushstrokes of blue, black, and white to create compositions that present figures void of features. In an interview with the Art Paper magazine, Ige explained that she has a deep love of blue, and by using it as her main colour, the viewer can become more immersed in the space. She also connects with the cultural significance of blue, which has been a colour to carry language and symbolise legacy, dignity and protection, which therefore envelopes the figures in her works, protecting them. She has recently been using West African Indigo and various Nigerian dried leaves used by Igbo and Yoruba as painting pigments with her paintings.

== Exhibition history ==
Year	Exhibition	Location	Solo or Group
2024	Aotearoa Contemporary	Auckland Art Gallery Toi o Tāmaki, Auckland	Group
2024	And you are of the heavens of the earth	Stevenson, Cape Town	Solo
2024	Summer Paintings	Gow Langsford, Auckland	Group
2022	Between Two Dimensions	Robert Projects, Los Angeles	Solo
2021	The poetic notions of blue	McLeavey Gallery, Wellington	Solo
2021	My Whole Body Changed into Something Else	Stevenson, Cape Town	Group
2020	A Place Apart	City Gallery, Wellington	Duo
2020	Three Painters	McLeavey Gallery, Wellington	Group
2019	Group Show	Karma, New York	Group
2019	Two Oceans at Once	ST PAUL St Gallery, Auckland	Group
2019	Pleiades: Seven Sisters of New Zealand	Gow Langsford, Auckland	Group
2019	On the Verge of Blue	SPA_CE, Napier	Group
2018	The Silence Before the Morning	Weasel Gallery, Hamilton	Solo
2018	Never an Answer: 12 Abstract Painters	The Vivian, Matakana	Group
2018	LISTE Art Fair Basel	Switzerland	Group
2017	Dirt Future	Artspace Aotearoa, Auckland	Group
