= Margaret Nielsen =

New Zealand pianist, piano teacher and academic (1933–2023)

Margaret Nielsen ONZM
- Born: 22 August 1933; Hāwera
- Died: 20 April 2023 (aged 90)
- Awards: Officer of the New Zealand Order of Merit

Academic background
- Education: Christchurch Teachers' College, University of Canterbury, Mills College at Northeastern University
- Academic advisors: Leon Kirchner, Darius Milhaud, Bernhard Abramowitsch

Academic work
- Institutions: Victoria University of Wellington, New Zealand Opera Company

Margaret Alison Nielsen ONZM (22 August 1933 – 20 April 2023) was a New Zealand pianist, music teacher and academic. In 2005 she was appointed an Officer of the New Zealand Order of Merit for services to music.

== Early life and education ==
Nielsen was born and brought up in Hāwera, and was the youngest of five children born to town clerk Joseph Nielsen and Maisie nee Fennell. Maisie was a piano teacher, and she and daughter Eileen died on the same day in 1936. After Maisie's death her sister Anne, a harpist, moved in to help bring up the children. Nielsen attended Hāwera Technical College, where she was the school pianist. The family were Catholic, but Margaret Nielsen abandoned the religion after being forbidden to play at a school concert in the Anglican church. Nielsen had piano lessons in New Plymouth, and attended a summer school run by Vernon Griffiths and John Ritchie. Nielsen travelled to Christchurch to attend Christchurch Teachers' College, and also studied piano with Ernest Empson. Nielsen was left a small legacy by her aunt Anne, which she used to study for a Bachelor of Music at the University of Canterbury. She was the first student to graduate with that degree with first class honours. Nielsen then studied at Mills College in California, where she earned a Master of Arts in Composition, returning to New Zealand in 1959.

== Career ==
Nielsen worked briefly as a pianist for the New Zealand Opera Company and the New Zealand Ballet, before joining the faculty of Victoria University of Wellington in 1960. Nielsen taught analysis and coached chamber music and served several terms as Head of the School of Music. She retired from the university in 1993.

Nielsen was close friends with composer Douglas Lilburn, and he, David Farquhar and Jack Body all dedicated pieces to her. Nielsen is mainly known for her work as a pianist, and performed on Radio New Zealand as well as at lunchtime concerts at the university. She recorded a CD of Lilburn's piano music, as well as pieces by Gillian Whitehead.

== Honours and awards ==
In the 2005 New Year Honours she was appointed an Officer of the New Zealand Order of Merit for services to music.

== Personal life ==
Nielsen married psychoanalyst Mario Fleischl in 1965. Fleischl died in 1971. Nielsen was active in advocating for homosexual law reform. She wrote to The Listener after the killing of Charles Aberhart in Hagley Park and the subsequent acquittal of his killers, who claimed he had propositioned them. When Venn Young introduced a private member's bill to legalise homosexuality, Nielsen tried to persuade other politicians to support the reform.
