= Alice Minchin =

New Zealand teacher and librarian (1889 – 1966)

Alice Ethel Minchin (5 November 1889 – 26 July 1966) was a New Zealand teacher and librarian. She was born in Waihou, near Panguru, New Zealand, on 5 November 1889. In 1917 she was appointed as the first librarian at the Auckland University College Library, a position she held until 1945.
