= Human Rights Commission (New Zealand) =

National institution of New Zealand

- Te Kāhui Tika Tangata (Māori)

Independent Crown entity overview
- Formed: 1977; 49 years ago
- Headquarters: Level 8, 44–52 The Terrace, Wellington 6011
- Independent Crown entity executives: Stephen Rainbow; Melissa Derby; Gail Pacheco; Prudence Walker
- Key document: Human Rights Act 1993
- Website: www.hrc.co.nz

The Human Rights Commission (Māori: Te Kāhui Tika Tangata) is the national human rights institution (NHRI) for New Zealand, operating independently from direction by the Cabinet. Founded in 1977, the commission addresses issues of discrimination, equality, and human rights through education, advocacy, and resolving complaints. It provides guidance on anti-discrimination law.

== Legislation and functions ==
The Human Rights Commission is a Crown entity. It was formed in 1977, and currently functions under the mandate of the Human Rights Act 1993. The Office of the Race Relations Conciliator was consolidated with the Human Rights Commission by an amendment to the Human Rights Act in 2001. The commission's primary functions are to "advocate and promote respect for, and an understanding and appreciation of, human rights in New Zealand society, and to encourage the maintenance and development of harmonious relations between individuals and among the diverse groups in New Zealand society".

== Commissioners ==
- Chief commissioner: Stephen Rainbow
- Race relations commissioner: Melissa Derby
- Equal employment opportunities commissioner: Gail Pacheco
- Disability rights commissioner: Prudence Walker

Jeremy Pope served as a commissioner until his death in August 2012.

=== List of chief commissioners ===
- Pat Downey (1977–1983)
- John Wallace (1983–1989)
- Margaret Bedggood (1989–1994)
- Pamela Jefferies (1994–2001)
- Ros Noonan (2001–2011)
- David Rutherford (2011–2018)
- Paula Tesoriero (acting 2018–2019)
- Paul Hunt (2019–2024)
- Karanina Sumeo (acting 2024)
- Stephen Rainbow (2024–present)

== Race relations ==
The 1993 act transformed the previous race relations conciliator into a race relations commissioner. Holders of the position have been:

- Sir Guy Powles (1972–1973)
- Harry Dansey (1975–1979)
- Hiwi Tauroa (1980–1986)
- Wally Hirsh (1986–1989)
- Chris Laidlaw (1989–1992)
- John Clarke (1992–1995)
- Rajen Prasad (1995–2000)
- Gregory Fortuin (2001–2002)
- Joris de Bres (2002–2013)
- Dame Susan Devoy (2013–2018)
- Meng Foon (2019–2023)
- Melissa Derby (2024–present)

== International status ==
The commission is one of some 70 NHRIs accredited by the International Co-ordinating Committee of NHRIs (ICC), a body sponsored by the Office of the United Nations High Commissioner for Human Rights (OHCHR). The commission's "A status" accreditation allows it special access to the United Nations human rights system, including speaking rights at the Human Rights Council and other committees. The commission has presented parallel reports ("shadow reports") to several UN treaty committees examining New Zealand's compliance with international human rights instruments. From 2010 to 2012 the commission chaired the ICC, and the Asia Pacific Forum of NHRIs, one of four regional sub-groups of NHRIs.

== History ==
=== Review of human rights ===
In 2010 the commission conducted a publicly available review of human rights in New Zealand in order to both identify the areas in which New Zealand does well, and where it could do better to combat persistent social problems. The 'report card' was an update of the commission's first report in 2004, and led its work for the next five years. The report noted steady improvements in New Zealand's human rights record since 2004, but also "the fragility of some of the gains and areas where there has been deterioration." In the report, the Commission identified thirty priority areas for action on human rights in New Zealand under a number of sections: general; civil and political rights; economic, social and cultural rights; and rights of specific groups.

=== Inquiry into culture and processes ===
In February 2018, Justice Minister Andrew Little commissioned an ministerial inquiry into the commission by retired judge Coral Shaw, following media reports of a sexual harassment scandal there. Sunday Star-Times journalist Harrison Christian had earlier reported a young American woman cut short her internship at the commission after she was groped by the organisation's chief financial officer at a work party. Shaw's review found the commission had failed in its handling of sexual harassment claims.

=== Housing Inquiry ===
In August 2021, the Human Rights Commission launched an inquiry into the housing crisis, stating that successive governments had failed to meet their obligations according to international law, specifically to the right to a decent home. The initial phase of the inquiry resulted in the release of a report focused on strengthening accountability and participation in the housing system, with further work done to develop a tool called "Measuring Progress", designed to evaluate the state of housing against key indicators and international human rights obligations. The second phase of the inquiry has been on emergency housing and the conditions and protections of renters as key topic areas. The inquiry is expected to conclude mid-2023.

=== 2023 resignation of race relations commissioner ===
On 16 June 2023, Meng Foon resigned from his position as race relations commissioner after failing to declare several conflicts of interest as required under the Crown Entities Act. Foon served as the director of an emergency housing company that had received income from government payments including over NZ$2 million in emergency accommodation funding. The Human Rights Commission had conducted an internal investigation into Foon's interests including emergency accommodation funding. Foon disputed that he had failed to declare his conflict of interest regarding the emergency accommodation funding and claimed that he had declared these interests prior to assuming his role as race relations commissioner. Earlier in April 2023, Foon had attracted controversy for donating to both members of the Labour and National parties.

In 2023, Claire Charters joined the commission; her post was in the area of Indigenous Peoples' rights.

=== 2024 leadership changes ===
On 16 August 2024, Justice Minister Paul Goldsmith appointed several new leaders to the Human Rights Commission including former Wellington City Councillor and management professional Stephen Rainbow as chief human rights commissioner, Auckland University of Technology economics professor Gail Pacheco as equal employment opportunities commissioner, and University of Waikato education senior lecturer and Free Speech Union member Melissa Derby as race relations commissioner. Left-wing blogger Martyn Bradbury and The Spinoff editor Madeleine Chapman criticised the appointment of Rainbow and Derby for their alleged transphobic views and Rainbow's pro-Israel views.

== See also ==
- Human rights in New Zealand
- Human rights commission
- National Statement on Religious Diversity
- Waitangi Tribunal
