= Student Job Search =

Student Job Search Aotearoa
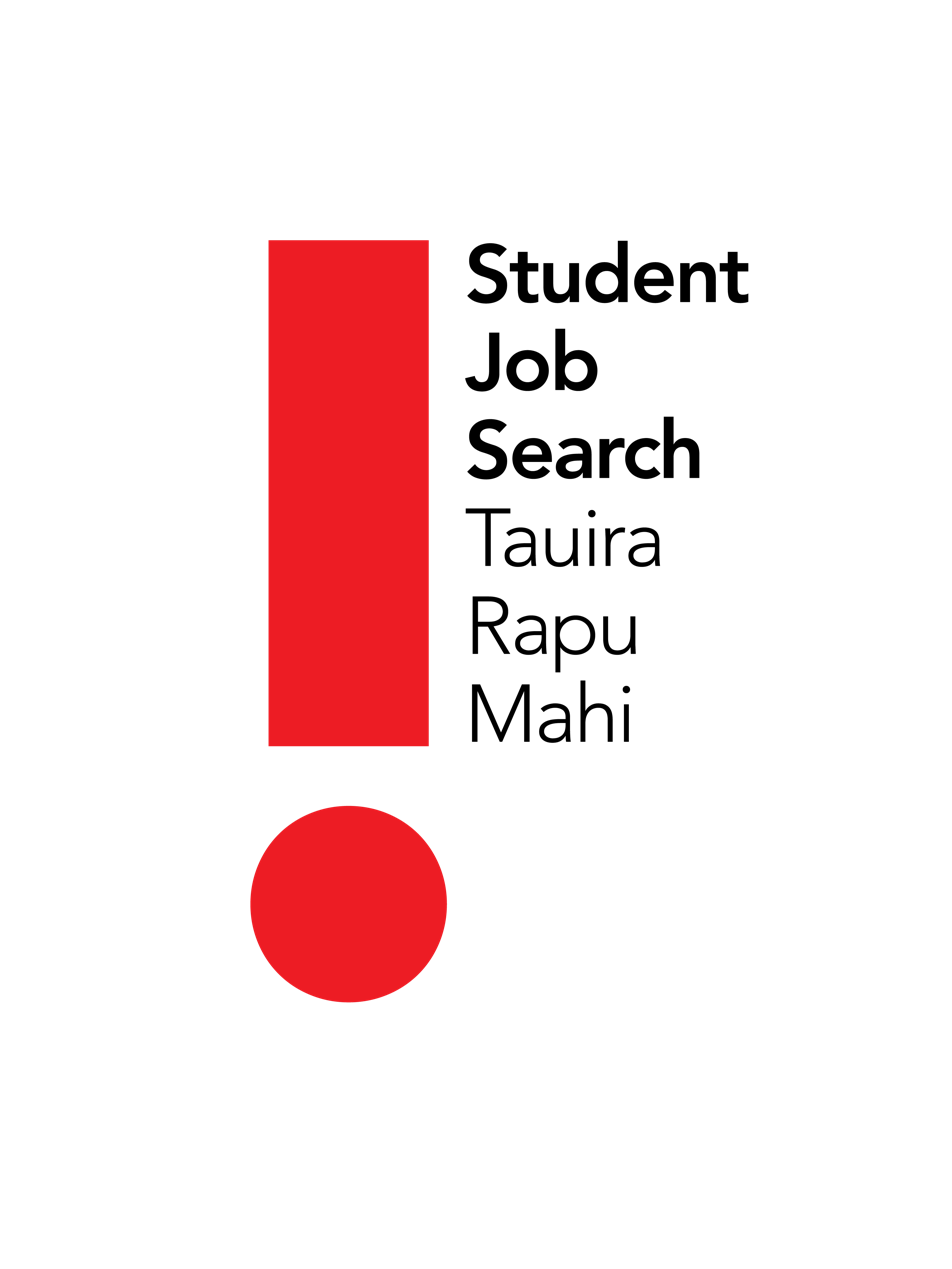
- Formation: 1982
- Headquarters: Wellington, New Zealand
- Website: www.sjs.co.nz

Student Job Search is a not-for-profit incorporated society, owned by 18 student associations from New Zealand’s leading universities and polytechnics. It is funded by the New Zealand government, whilst operating independently.

== History ==
From 1977 to 1982 the Department of Labour ran the Student Community Service Programme to help university, polytechnic and college of education students to find work during the summer vacation period.

In 1982 Student Job Search was established as a service to help tertiary students find casual work to help alleviate student poverty. Originally the service was campus-based and the individual university student unions established management committees to run the service.

By 2021, SJS was providing 27,000 job placements to students every year.

== Purpose ==
Set up to help tertiary students find employment, and now funded by the government for that purpose, Student Job Search registers students and employers to make it easier for students to find, and for employers to fill jobs that would suit tertiary students.

=== Funding ===
The Ministry of Social Development (MSD) provides over 90% of the funding Student Job Search receives to deliver their services to support students in securing the employment they need to fund their studies and improve their post graduate employment prospects.
