= Auckland University of Technology =

Public research university in Auckland, New Zealand

- Te Wānanga Aronui o Tāmaki Makau Rau (Māori)
- Other names: AUT, AUT University
- Former names: Auckland Technical School (1895–1906); Auckland Technical College (1906–1913); Seddon Memorial Technical College (1913–1963); Auckland Technical Institute (1963–1989); Auckland Institute of Technology (1989–2000)
- Motto: Knowledge that works
- Type: Public research university
- Established: 2000 (lineage back to 1895)
- Affiliations: ASAIHL; AACSB; ACU
- Endowment: NZ$2.37 million (31 December 2021)
- Budget: NZ$425.4 million (31 December 2020)
- Chancellor: Rob Campbell CNZM
- Vice-Chancellor: Damon Salesa
- Academic staff: 1,194 (2020)
- Administrative staff: 1,255 (2020)
- Students: 25,270 (2024)
- Undergraduates: 13,319 (2020)
- Postgraduates: 2,586 (2020)
- Location: Auckland, New Zealand; 36.8536°S 174.7665°E
- Campus: Multiple sites: City, North, South
- Student Magazine: Debate
- Website: www.aut.ac.nz

Auckland University of Technology (AUT; Māori: Te Wānanga Aronui o Tāmaki Makau Rau) is a public university in Auckland, New Zealand. It was established on 1 January 2000, when the Auckland Institute of Technology was incorporated into the newly created university by Order in Council under the Education Act 1989. The institution's lineage dates to 1895, when the Auckland Technical School opened; it became Seddon Memorial Technical College in 1913 before later evolving into a tertiary institute.

AUT is one of the country's larger universities by enrolment. Universities New Zealand reported a student headcount of 25,270 in 2024 (18,565 equivalent full-time students). The university operates three campuses in Auckland—City, North and South (Manukau).

AUT is also associated with two specialist locations: AUT Millennium, a high-performance sport and community facility on Auckland's North Shore, and the Refugee Education Centre at the Māngere Refugee Resettlement Centre, where new teaching spaces were opened in 2016.

== History ==
Historically, New Zealand lacked technical training institutions, even after the establishment of free and compulsory education in 1877. As a result, many calls were made for the education system to incorporate technical training. In response, Robert Stout, the Minister of Education in 1885, tried to compel universities and secondary schools to establish technical education. This fell on deaf ears, so instead he gave land to the Wellington Board of Education to establish a school.

In 1886 the Wellington School of Design was opened. Later, in 1895, the Auckland Technical School opened as an evening school. In 1913, the organisation became the Seddon Memorial Technical College, named for Richard Seddon, the longest-serving New Zealand premier.

In the early 1960s, educational reforms resulted in the separation of secondary and tertiary teaching. Two educational establishments were formed; the tertiary (polytechnic) adopting the name Auckland Technical Institute (ATI) in 1963 and the secondary school continuing with the same name. For three years they co-existed on the same site, but by 1964 the secondary school had moved to a new site in Western Springs, and eventually became Western Springs College. In 1989, ATI became Auckland Institute of Technology (AIT), and the current name was adopted when university status was granted in 2000.

Sir Paul Reeves served as university chancellor from 2005 until his death in 2011.

== Campuses and facilities ==
AUT has three campuses: City (in Auckland CBD), North and South, and the training institute, Millennium. City and North campuses offer student accommodation. AUT runs a shuttle bus service between the city and south campus.

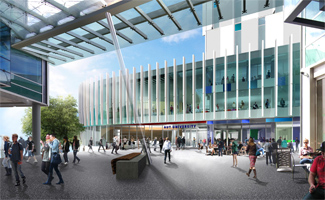
Sir Paul Reeves Precinct at AUT's City Campus

=== City campus ===
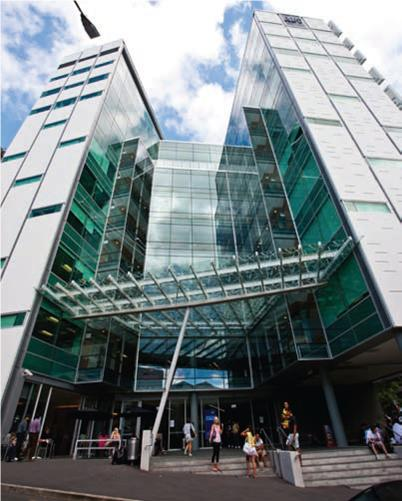
WF (Business) Building at AUT's Auckland City Campus

City Campus spreads over several sites in the heart of central Auckland. The largest site is situated on Wellesley Street East and is home to most of the academic units and central administration, including the Vice-Chancellor's Office and research centres. Four of the five Faculties share this location; Business, Economics and Law, Design and Creative Technologies, Culture and Society and Te Ara Poutama.

Facilities of the campus include an International Student Centre, printing centre, gym, Chinese Centre, Pasifika Student Support Service, Postgraduate Centre and Te Tari Āwhina Learning Development Centre. The Central Library holds over 245,000 books and journals on four floors. There are cafes, restaurants and bars, including the student-owned Vesbar. Training restaurants Piko Restaurant and Four Seasons Restaurant have operated commercially since 2011. There is also a marae, the AUT Shop, St Paul St Art Gallery, a university bookshop, and the Wellesley student apartments.

AUT has recently completed a number of buildings, including the new WZ building designed to house the engineering, computer science and mathematics students under one roof. The first 8 levels of the 12-storey $120 million building opened in July 2018 to coincide with the start of the second academic semester. The building itself was designed to be a teaching tool, with structural components visible, ceilings left exposed for viewing and the building management systems being visible on screens for analysis by students. Sustainability was also a goal, with rain water being collected for use in the labs, occupancy sensors in the rooms to ensure that areas are not being unnecessarily lit and solar fins on the outside of the building to regulate heat from the sun and ease load on the air-conditioning system.

Another recent building completion is the $98 million WG precinct. Named after the former Chancellor of the university, the Sir Paul Reeves Building hosts the School of Communication Studies. The 12-storey building was officially opened by Prime Minister John Key on 22 March 2013. It provides an additional learning space of about 20,000 square metres that consists of convention spaces, screen and television studios and a motion capture, sound and performance studio.

The most recent addition to the city campus is the WQ building (Formally known as Te Āhuru Student Accommodation and Recreation Centre). This building serves as the home to 697 students in the student accommodation part of the building operated by UniLodge. The rest of the building is occupied by the AUT Recreation centre which has a multipurpose court, breakout rooms, dance studios as well as staff offices. The student accommodation opened its doors in February 2021 and the Recreation Centre followed shortly later with it being officially opened by MP Chlöe Swarbrick on 22 July 2021.

=== South campus ===
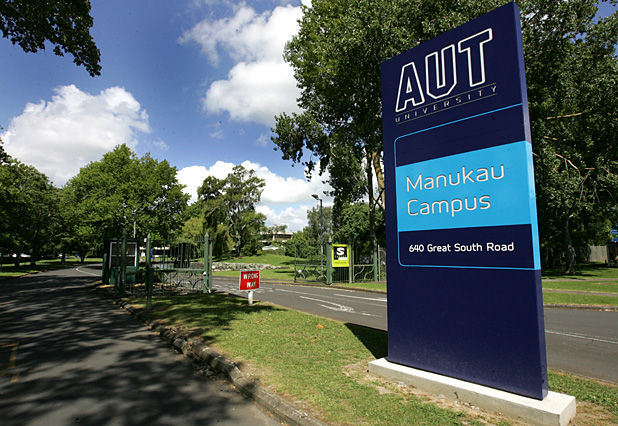
Entrance to AUT South Campus

AUT opened South Campus (formerly Manukau Campus) in 2010, creating the first university campus based in the region. It offers undergraduate and postgraduate degrees in business, computer and information sciences, education, health sciences, year 1 of law, as well as sports management and science. South Campus hosts an oral health clinic and the perioperative practice simulation suite along with its own library, student lounges, student information centre, course information centre, computer labs, wireless network, and café. The campus also boasts astro turf courts with tennis, basketball, netball, volleyball, touch, and soccer equipment available for hire.

In 2016, the university invested significantly in the construction of the Mana Hauora (MH) Building. Construction of MH was completed in December 2016, and was officially opened by Prime Minister Bill English in March 2017. As the largest building on campus, MH is now the new heart of the campus and incorporates a number of sustainability design features. In 2017, three awards were given in recognition of the new MH Building at the New Zealand Institute of Architects (NZIA) Auckland Regional Awards.

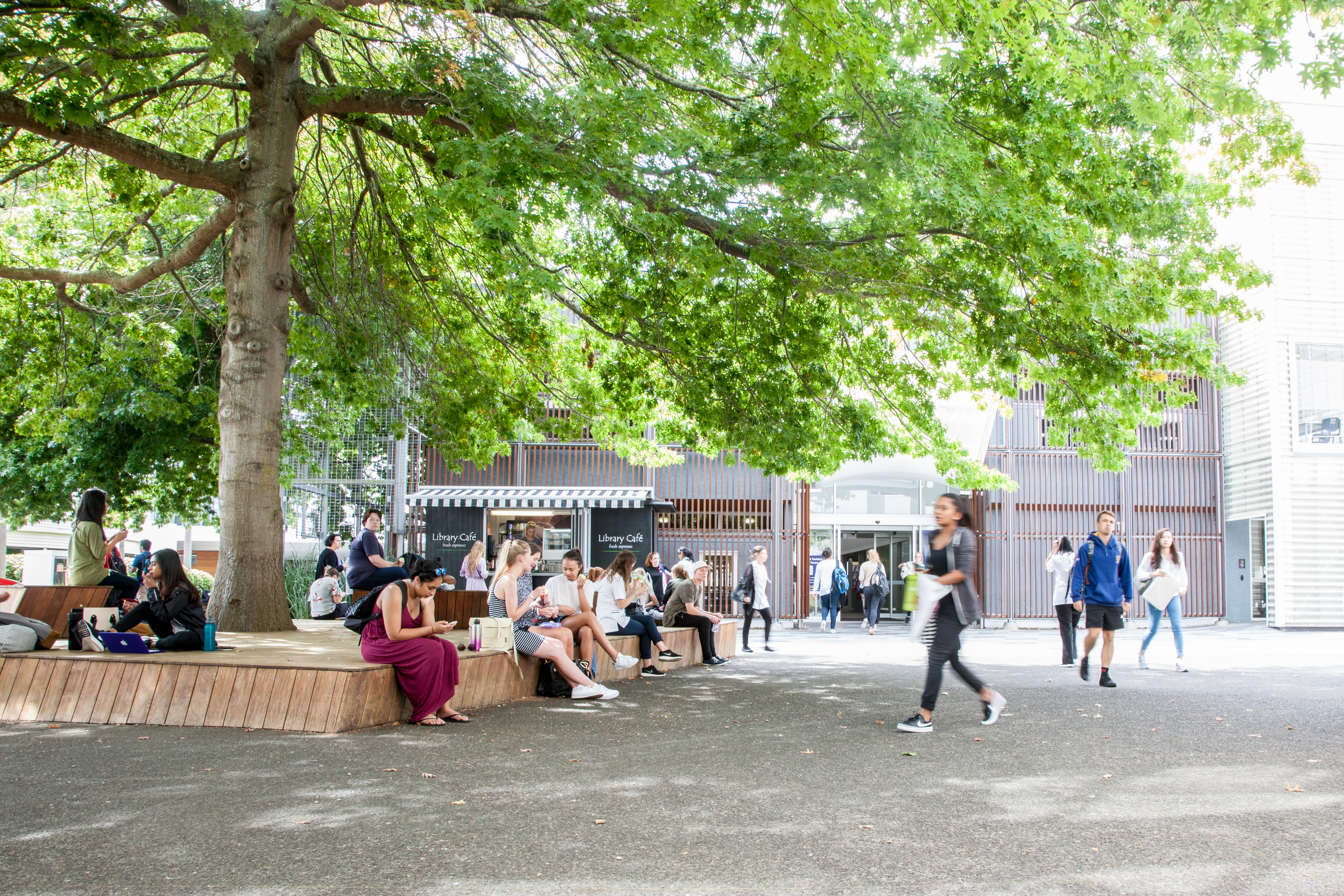
AUT North Campus

=== North campus ===
North Campus is located on Akoranga Drive in Northcote. The Faculty of Health and Environmental Sciences (including the Sport and Recreation division) and School of Education share this campus, which has park-like grounds. AUT's main sport and fitness centre is located at the campus, encompassing a gymnasium, weights room, testing equipment, and indoor courts. The campus also offers a library, student services centre, early childhood centre, AuSM branch, print shop, health counselling and wellbeing centre, university bookshop, and food outlets. In addition, the campus provides three health clinics (physiotherapy, podiatry, and psychotherapy), which are now located at the NorthMed Health Clinic building at 3 Akoranga Drive, Northcote (since July 2017). North Campus is closely linked with the nearby AUT Millennium Institute of Sport and Health.

=== AUT Millennium ===
Like AUT North Campus, the Millennium Institute is located on Auckland's North Shore, at Mairangi Bay. AUT Millennium provides sports training, and hosts national and local sports organisations, including Swimming New Zealand, New Zealand Water Polo, Northsport Olympic Weightlifting, and Sport and Recreation New Zealand. The institute has training facilities, athlete accommodation, sports science laboratories, an aquatics facility, and a commercial gym.

=== Warkworth Radio Astronomical Observatory ===
AUT maintains a number of facilities off campus, which until 2023, included the AUT Radio Telescope, New Zealand's first radio telescope. The 12m telescope is located near Warkworth and is part of New Zealand's and Australia's involvement in the international mega-science project, the Square Kilometre Array. The AUT/New Zealand Alliance won the 'Highly Commended' award in the Innovation Excellence in Research category at the 2016 New Zealand Innovation Awards.

=== AUT Centre for Refugee Education ===
AUT's Centre for Refugee Education, located in Māngere, provides an on-arrival six-week education programme for the 1,000 refugees who come to New Zealand each year under the government quota scheme. The education programme teaches English language skills at early childhood, primary, secondary and adult levels, as well as orientation to life in New Zealand. With a new set of learners arriving every two months, and with ages ranging from early childhood to adult, the teaching team has developed a curriculum that gives refugees English and life skills, but remains flexible in order to tailor the lessons to each new intake.

== Organisation and administration ==
=== Faculties ===
AUT has five faculties. These are:

- Culture and Society
- Business, Economics and Law
- Design and Creative Technologies
- Health and Environmental Sciences
- Te Ara Poutama

AUT has 16 schools that sit within these faculties. These are:

- Acute and Primary Health
- Allied Health
- Art and Design
- Business
- Communication Studies
- Community and Public Health
- Education
- Engineering, Computer and Mathematical Sciences
- Future Environments (also contains the former Colab: Creative Technologies)
- Hospitality and Tourism
- Law
- Science
- Social Sciences and Humanities
- Sport, Exercise and Health
- Te Ara Poutama – Māori and Indigenous Development

=== Programmes ===
AUT offers undergraduate and postgraduate (both doctoral and Master) degrees, as well as sub-degree qualifications such as certificates and diplomas. Programmes are offered in the areas/fields of applied sciences, art and design, business, business information systems, communication studies, computer and information sciences, education, exercise science, engineering, health care practice, hospitality and tourism, languages, law, mathematical science, midwifery, nursing, occupational therapy, oral health, paramedicine and emergency management, Māori development, physiotherapy, podiatry, psychology, psychotherapy, public health, rehabilitation and occupation studies, social science, and sport.

The AUT Business School has been recognised as one of the top business schools in the world by the Association to Advance Collegiate Schools of Business (AACSB) International.

=== Research centres ===
As a relatively new university, AUT came in eighth place in the 2006 Performance-Based Research Fund (PBRF) round, but has shown the greatest improvement in PBRF rating of New Zealand's eight universities.

Research partnerships and exchanges have been established with some of the world's leading universities. AUT's growing research profile has seen an increase in research programme enrolments and external funding, as well as research institutions.

The university opened new research centres and institutes in 2016, bringing the total number to more than 60, covering a wide range of disciplines. In 2016, AUT's quality-assured research outputs increased by 9% to more than 2000 outputs, including publication in leading international journals.

==== New Zealand Tourism Research Institute ====
Disestablished in 2023

The New Zealand Tourism Research Institute (NZTRI) brings together local and international experts in tourism and hospitality. It was established in 1999 by Professor Simon Milne, and is located in the School of Hospitality and Tourism. In 2010 the institute brought together 19 researchers as well as 15 PhD students, several other graduate students being linked to the Institute in more informal ways.

NZTRI conducts research projects around the world and has developed strong links with Huế University in Vietnam, Wageningen University in the Netherlands, University of Akureyri in Iceland, McGill University and York University in Canada among others. Its research programme areas include coastal and marine tourism, community development, cultural heritage tourism, event tourism, health and wellness tourism, hospitality research, indigenous tourism, Pacific Islands tourism, tourism marketing, and tourism technology. The institute has a team of research officers, international interns and other allied staff.

==== Pacific Media Centre ====
The Pacific Media Centre (PMC) is located within the School of Communication Studies. It was founded in 2007 to develop media and journalism research in New Zealand, particularly involving Māori, Pacific Islands, ethnic and vernacular media topics. It is recognised as a diversity project by the Human Rights Commission (New Zealand), and has been featured by the Panos London Media Development programme for its development communication work.

The centre publishes Asia-Pacific journalism, and has published Pacific Scoop since 2009. It also publishes media and communication studies books, like the 2009 book Communication, Culture and Society in Papua New Guinea: Yo Tok Wanem?, in collaboration with other publishers or overseas universities. The centre was featured as a Creative Commons case study in 2010. Founding director David Robie, a New Zealand author, journalist and media academic, won a Vice Chancellor's Award in 2011 for excellence in university teaching.

Pacific Media Watch is PMC's daily independent Asia-Pacific media monitoring service and research project. The site was launched in Sydney in October 1996, and has links with the University of the South Pacific, the University of PNG (UPNG) and the Australian Centre for Independent Journalism (ACIJ). Since moving to AUT in 2007, it has become a digital repository and received a grant from the Pacific Development and Conservation Trust in 2010 to "expand its educational and research role for the Pacific region". PMW has established a Pactok server archive, and added a D-Space archive in 2010. Representatives of Pacific Media Watch report on the region's news developments, provide advocacy for media freedom, and published a media freedom report on the South Pacific in 2011.

PMC has also published Pacific Journalism Review, a peer-reviewed research journal on media issues and communication in the South Pacific and Australia, since 2002. The journal was previously published at the University of Papua New Guinea from 1994 to 1999. The editorial policy focuses on the cultural politics of the media, including new media and social movements, the culture of indigenous peoples, the politics of tourism and development, the role of the media and the formation of national identity. It also covers environmental and development studies in the media and communication, and vernacular media in the region. In October 2010, PJR was awarded the "Creative Stimulus Award" for academic journals in the inaugural Academy Awards of the Global Creative Industries in Beijing, China. The journal has advocated free speech and freedom of information in the Asia-Pacific region.

==== Other research institutions ====
- Centre for Kode Technology Innovation (KTI, in association with Kode Biotech)
- Centre for Social Data Analytics (CSDA)
- Creative Industries Research Institute (CIRI)
- Earth and Oceanic Sciences Research Institute (EOS)
- Engineering Research and Innovation Cluster (ERIC)
- Health and Rehabilitation Research Institute (HRRI)
- Institute for Culture, Discourse and Communication (ICDC)
- Institute for Radio Astronomy and Space Research (IRASR)
- Institute of Biomedical Technologies (IBTec)
- Institute of Public Policy (IPP)
- Institute of Sport and Recreation Research
- Knowledge Engineering and Discovery Research Institute (KEDRI)
- National Institute for Public Health and Mental Health Research (NIPHMHR)
- National Institute for Stroke and Applied Neurosciences (NISAN)
- New Zealand Work and Labour Market Institute (NZWALMI)
- Te Ipukarea: National Māori Language Institute

Within these research institutes exist a large number of research centres and units. The NIPHMHR administers the Pacific Islands Families Study.

== Academic profile ==
University rankings

Global – Overall
- ARWU World: 901–1000 (2025)
- CWTS World: 974 (Note: The CWTS Leiden Ranking is based on P (top 10%).) (2024)
- QS World: =410 (2026)
- QS Employability: 301–500 (2022)
- THE World: 401–500 (2026)
- USNWR Global: =572 (25/26)

National – Overall
- ARWU National: 7 (2025)
- CWTS National: 7 (2024)
- QS National: 8 (2026)
- THE National: 5–7 (2026)
- USNWR National: 5 (25/26)

=== Academic reputation ===
In the 2026 Quacquarelli Symonds World University Rankings (published 2025), the university attained a tied position of #410 (8th nationally).

In the Times Higher Education World University Rankings 2026 (published 2025), the university attained a position of #401–500 (tied 5–7th nationally).

In the 2025 Academic Ranking of World Universities, the university attained a position of #901–1000 (7th nationally).

In the 2025–2026 U.S. News & World Report Best Global Universities, the university attained a tied position of #572 (5th nationally).

In the CWTS Leiden Ranking 2024, the university attained a position of #974 (7th nationally).

== Notable people ==
=== Notable faculty ===
- Richard Bedford (born 1945) – human geographer
- Hannah Buckley – professor of ecology
- James George (born 1962) – novelist, short-story writer and creative writing lecturer
- John Hinchcliff – inaugural vice-chancellor
- Nikola Kasabov – computer scientist, academic and author
- Gail Pacheco – professor of economics
- Katherine Ravenswood – professor of industrial relations
- William Henry Skinner – founder, architect

=== Notable alumni ===
AUT has more than 75,000 alumni.

==== Art ====
- Kay George – artist
- Joan Gragg – Cook Islands artist
- Ruth Ige – Nigerian-born painter
- Andy Leleisi'uao – artist
- Sofia Minson – artist
- Angela Tiatia – artist

==== Business and law ====
- Jim Anderton – politician
- Stephen Tindall – founder of The Warehouse
- Peter Williams – alpine skier
- Hiroki Sakai – footballer

==== Entertainment ====
- Joo Jong-hyuk – South Korean actor
- Fiona Sussman – novelist, short story writer and doctor

==== Media and communications ====
- Dominic Bowden – presenter of X Factor New Zealand and former presenter of NZ Idol
- Joel Defries – former presenter of Blue Peter on BBC, Select Live on C4
- David Farrier - writer, actor, filmmaker
- Duncan Garner – Radio Live drive host, former political editor at 3 News, TV3
- Charlotte Glennie – Asia correspondent for ABC
- Carol Hirschfeld – general manager of production at Māori Television, former anchor of 3 News, former executive producer of Campbell Live
- Pippa Wetzell – host of Fair Go, former host of Breakfast at TVNZ.

==== Technology ====
- Bruce McLaren – race-car designer, driver, engineer and inventor
- Annette Presley – founder and CEO, Slingshot ISP

==== Other ====
- Ali Williams – rugby player
- Angela Cullen – physiotherapist
- Hana O'Regan – Māori language advocate and academic
- Sue Bradford – activist, academic, and former New Zealand politician
- Claire McLachlan – professor, specialist in early-childhood literacy
- Erikana Pedersen – netballer
- Paul Moon – historian

== Student life ==
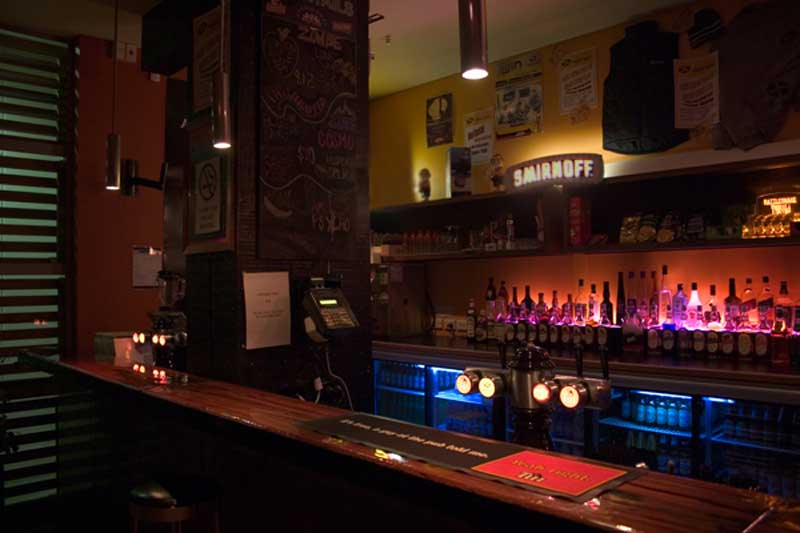
Vesbar at the AUT Wellesley campus

=== Student union ===
AUTSA (AUT Students' Association) is the students' association at AUT. Every student attending a course run by AUT is a member of AUTSA, and its primary function is to promote and maintain the rights and welfare of students. It provides advocacy and support, a student diary and wall planner, Student Job Search, food vouchers, and food bank. The AUTSA Advocacy Team provide advice to students with academic grievances, grade appeals, harassment, or tenancy issues.

The AUTSA Student Representative Council (SRC) is composed of a president, a vice president, and Māori Affairs, Pasifika, Diversity, International, Disability and Postgraduate officers. There are Business and Law, Design and Creative Technologies, Health and Environmental Sciences, Culture and Society and Te Ara Poutama Faculty Representatives. There are also City Campus, North Campus and South Campus Representatives. AUTSA representatives sit on various committees, focus groups and boards to speak out on behalf of 24,000 AUTSA members. Former presidents include April Pokino (2014–2015), Kizito Essuman (2012–2013), Veronica Ng Lam (2010–2011), Andre D'cruz (2009), and Jan Herman (2007–2008).

AUTSA provides a fortnightly student magazine called Debate. It is produced by a full-time editor and a team of student contributors. The magazine features news, views, cartoons, feature articles and columns. Debate was recognised by the Aotearoa Student Press Association Awards in 2005 "Best Small Publication" (Rebecca Williams, editor) and 2009 "Best Humourist" (Ryan Boyd, editor) and "Best Original Photography" (Clinton Cardozo, designer). AuSM also produces an annual student diary and wallplanner, and operates social media accounts.

AUTSA supports more than 40 affiliated clubs, and organises concerts, comedy shows, live DJs, dance parties, the annual Orientation Festival and other events. AUTSA sponsored the AUT Titans at the Australian University Games in 2009, winning gold in netball and touch rugby. The AUTSA lodge is based in Tongariro National Park, accommodates up to 12 people and is available to AUTSA members from $160 per night for up to 12 people. Campus venue Vesbar is owned and operated by AUTSA for its students, and operates throughout the year.
