= Wellington Bays =

- Single-member general constituency for the New Zealand House of Representatives
- Interactive map of boundaries from the 2026 election (including the Chatham Islands)
- Formation: 2026
- Region: Wellington; Chatham Islands
- Character: Urban
- Term: 3 years

Member for Wellington Bays

Wellington Bays is a New Zealand electorate, returning a single member to the New Zealand House of Representatives. It was used for the first time in the 2026 New Zealand general election. It replaced the Rongotai electorate and covers southeast Wellington. Based on preliminary results, Craig Renney of the Labour Party has won the 2026 general election, but the result may change with the final vote count expected for 27 November.

== Population centres ==
The Wellington Bays electorate covers Wellington's southern and eastern coastal suburbs including the Miramar and Strathmore Park on the Miramar Peninsula; Evans Bay-adjacent suburbs Roseneath, Hataitai and Kilbirnie; south coast suburbs Ōwhiro Bay, Island Bay, Houghton Bay, Rongotai and Lyall Bay; as well as Berhampore, Kingston, Mornington, Vogeltown, Brooklyn and Mount Cook. It further includes the Chatham Islands some 768 km to the electorate's southeast.

Significant sites within the electorate include Wellington Airport, Wellington Hospital, Wellington Zoo and the Basin Reserve.

== History ==
The 2025 boundary review required a reduction in North Island electorates by one to reflect nationwide population shifts. The three Wellington City electorates (Rongotai, Wellington Central and Ōhāriu) were all underpopulated. All were abolished. The suburbs of Mount Cook and Brooklyn from Wellington Central were combined with the former Rongotai electorate and the new electorate was named Wellington Bays. In the 2026 general election, Craig Renney of the Labour Party won the electorate based on preliminary results, but The New Zealand Herald considers this as one of five electorates where the result may change with the final vote count expected for 27 November. Julie Anne Genter of the Green Party trails Renney by 140 votes.

=== Members of Parliament ===
Key

Labour Green ACT Opportunity

Election	Winner
2026 election	Craig Renney (provisional)

=== List MPs ===
Members of Parliament elected from party lists in elections where that person also unsuccessfully contested Te Tai Tokerau. Unless otherwise stated, all MPs terms began and ended at general elections.

Election	Winner
2026 election	Julie Anne Genter (provisional)
2026 election	Nicole McKee
2026 election	Kayla Kingdon-Bebb

== Election results ==
=== 2026 election ===
The 2026 election was held on 7 November 2026. Candidates for Wellington Bays are listed at Candidates in the 2026 New Zealand general election by electorate § Wellington Bays. Official results will be available after 27 November 2026.
