= Southgate, New Zealand =

Suburb in Wellington City, New Zealand

Southgate
- Suburb
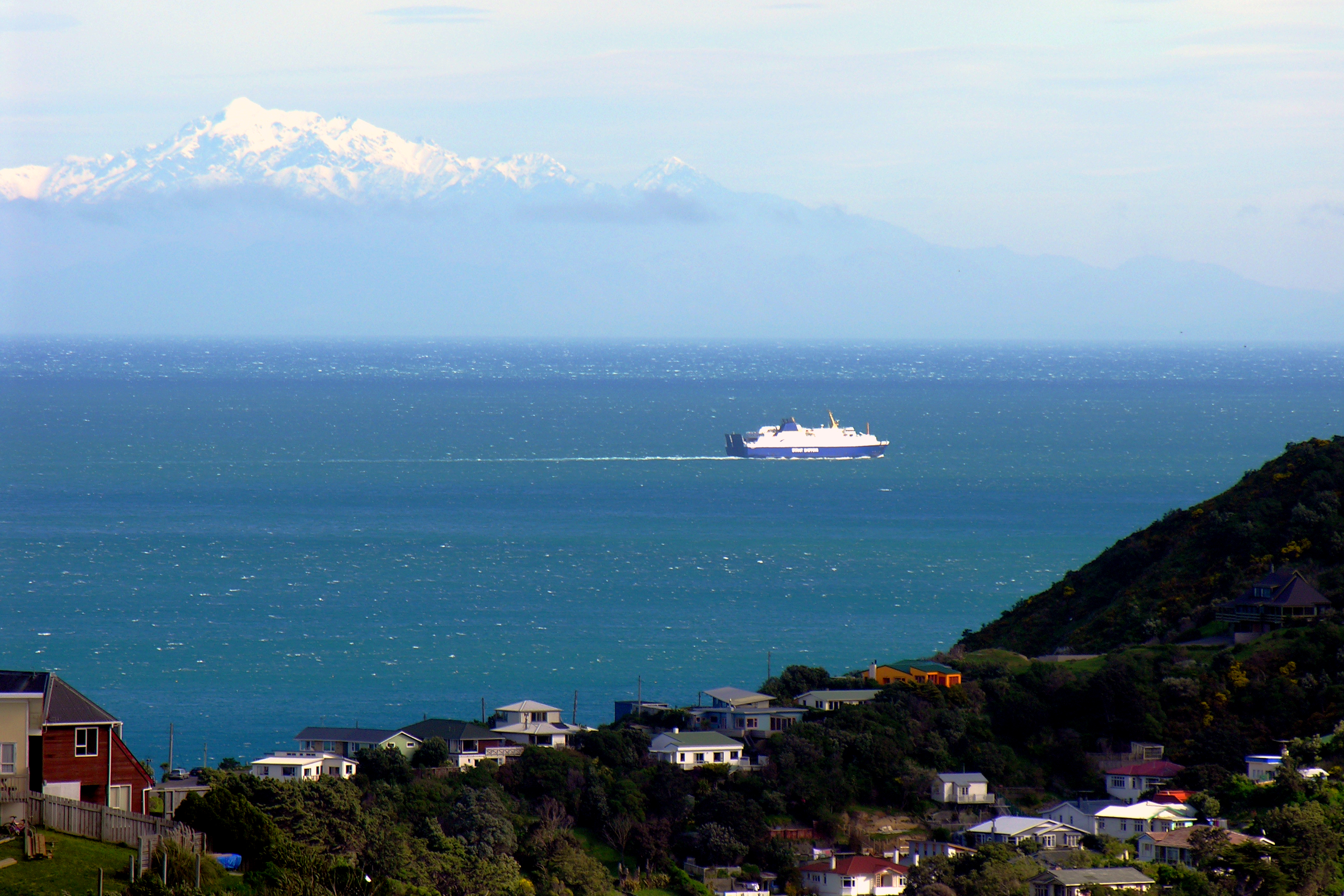
- Cook Strait from Southgate
- Interactive map of Southgate
- Coordinates: 41.341°S 174.781°E
- Country: New Zealand
- City: Wellington City
- Local authority: Wellington City Council
- Electoral ward: Paekawakawa/Southern Ward; Te Whanganui-a-Tara Māori Ward

Area
  - Land: 47 ha (120 acres)

Population (June 2025)
  - Total: 1,100
  - Density: 2,300/km^{2} (6,100/sq mi)

Berhampore	Newtown	Melrose
Island Bay	Southgate	Houghton Bay
	(Cook Strait)

Southgate is a subdivision of the Houghton Bay suburb of Wellington, New Zealand, in the Paekawakawa/Southern Ward. The main road is Buckley Road, which runs south from the point at which Mount Albert Road changes name to Houghton Bay Road.

A housing development was created on Buckley Road in 1957, and another ten years later. Most houses in the suburb were built in the 1970s.

== Demographics ==
Southgate statistical area covers 0.47 km^{2} (0.18 sq mi). It had an estimated population of 1,100 as of June 2025, with a population density of 2,340 people per km^{2}.

Historical population
Year	Pop.	±% p.a.
2006	1,173	—
2013	1,176	+0.04%
2018	1,164	−0.20%
2023	1,086	−1.38%

Southgate had a population of 1,086 in the 2023 New Zealand census, a decrease of 78 people (−6.7%) since the 2018 census, and a decrease of 90 people (−7.7%) since the 2013 census. There were 525 males, 549 females, and 12 people of other genders in 408 dwellings. 5.2% of people identified as LGBTIQ+. The median age was 43.2 years (compared with 38.1 years nationally). There were 168 people (15.5%) aged under 15 years, 168 (15.5%) aged 15 to 29, 585 (53.9%) aged 30 to 64, and 162 (14.9%) aged 65 or older.

People could identify as more than one ethnicity. The results were 77.9% European (Pākehā); 9.4% Māori; 6.1% Pasifika; 13.8% Asian; 4.1% Middle Eastern, Latin American and African New Zealanders (MELAA); and 1.9% other, which includes people giving their ethnicity as "New Zealander". English was spoken by 96.4%, Māori by 2.5%, Samoan by 3.3%, and other languages by 24.3%. No language could be spoken by 1.9% (e.g. too young to talk). New Zealand Sign Language was known by 0.3%. The percentage of people born overseas was 32.6, compared with 28.8% nationally.

Religious affiliations were 30.4% Christian, 5.2% Hindu, 0.3% Islam, 0.3% Buddhist, 0.3% Jewish, and 1.7% other religions. People who answered that they had no religion were 56.1%, and 6.1% of people did not answer the census question.

Of those at least 15 years old, 405 (44.1%) people had a bachelor's or higher degree, 372 (40.5%) had a post-high school certificate or diploma, and 135 (14.7%) people exclusively held high school qualifications. The median income was $55,300, compared with $41,500 nationally. 237 people (25.8%) earned over $100,000 compared to 12.1% nationally. The employment status of those at least 15 was 534 (58.2%) full-time, 129 (14.1%) part-time, and 24 (2.6%) unemployed.
