= Happy Valley, New Zealand =

Happy Valley may refer to several locations in New Zealand.

- Happy Valley, Wellington
- Happy Valley, West Coast, the site of an occupation by the Save Happy Valley Campaign
