= Berhampore (disambiguation) =

Berhampore is a city in the state of West Bengal, India.

Berhampore may also refer to:

- Berhampore, New Zealand, suburb in Wellington, New Zealand
- Berhampore (community development block), an administrative division in the Indian state of West Bengal
- Berhampore (Lok Sabha constituency), a parliamentary constituency in India
- Berhampore (Vidhan Sabha constituency), an assembly constituency in Murshidabad district in the Indian state of West Bengal
