= Craig Renney =

New Zealand economist and politician

- Born: 1979 (age 46–47); Northumberland, England
- Occupations: Economist and politician
- Political party: Labour Party

Craig Renney (born 1979) is a New Zealand economist and politician. He was the Labour Party candidate in Wellington Bays for the 2026 general election. Based on preliminary results, he has won the electorate, but the results may change with the final vote count expected for 27 November.

== Early life and education ==
In 1979, Renney was born and then raised in the town of Cramlington in Northumberland, England. His father was a mining engineer and his mother worked at the post office and local authority. The area where Renney grew up was affected by mine closures and he later said this triggered his interest in economics. He was an undergraduate in politics and economics at the University of Stirling and earned master's degrees from Northumbria University in urban policy and economic regeneration, and then a further masters in public administration. He has also attended the University of Economics in Prague, and Harvard University.

In 2012 he moved to Wellington, New Zealand, a move he said was triggered by the Cameron–Clegg coalition's austerity programme.

== Professional career ==
In the United Kingdom, Renney worked as an economic policy advisor for the North East Assembly and for the Audit Commission. After the Audit Commission was disestablished, Renney moved to New Zealand where he worked as a public servant for the Treasury, Ministry of Business, Innovation and Employment, and the Reserve Bank.

In 2015, Renney began working as a researcher for the Labour Party's opposition finance spokesperson, Grant Robertson. He prepared the party's budget projections for that year's general election. When the party formed a coalition government with New Zealand First and Robertson became Minister of Finance, Renney was appointed Robertson's senior economic advisor. In that role, he helped Robertson to prepare the New Zealand Budget in 2018, 2019 and 2020 as well as the COVID-19 response and Labour Party policy for the 2020 general election. He left Robertson's office after the 2020 election.

In 2020 he commenced as policy director and economist for the New Zealand Council of Trade Unions (CTU). In 2024, Renney was barred from a "lock-up" on a Treasury restricted briefing on the Half-Year Economic and Fiscal Update and the Budget Policy Statement. The Treasury stated that Renney did not meet the attendance criteria despite economists from the CTU having attended the briefing in previous years. A decision to block Renney, the CTU and other non-profit groups from participating in the 2025 Budget lock-up was reversed after the Treasury received a "significant amount of feedback" about those restrictions.

== Political career ==
After Labour lost the 2023 general election, Renney was elected a member of the Labour Party's policy council. He campaigned on changing tax policy in his election bid. In 2025, the party announced it would campaign on a capital gains tax.

In November 2025, Renney was selected as the Labour Party candidate for the Wellington Bays electorate. He stated his priorities in his campaign were housing, health, jobs and addressing the cost of living. He supports establishing a social insurance scheme, renationalising large energy generator-retailer companies (gentailers) and setting a date for banning the import of internal combustion engine vehicles. After his selection media speculated if, given his economic experience, Renney might replace Barbara Edmonds as Labour's finance spokesperson. However Labour leader Chris Hipkins ruled it out.

Renney's book The Good Economy was published by Bridget Williams Books in December 2025. The book sets out a left-wing economic agenda including new taxes on electricity generators and high-profit supermarkets to fund increased government investment in infrastructure and social housing. The cover asks: "What does a good economy look like and how do we build it?"

During the 2026 New Zealand general election, Renney contested the Wellington Bays electorate for Labour. He was ranked 50th on the Labour Party list. Based on preliminary results, Renney unseated the incumbent Green Party Member of Parliament Julie Anne Genter by a narrow margin of 140 votes. The New Zealand Herald considers this as one of five electorates where the result may change with the final vote count expected for 27 November.

== Bibliography ==
- Renney, Craig (2025). The Good Economy. ISBN 978-1-991301-54-3.
