= Happy Valley, Wellington =

Suburb of Wellington City, New Zealand

Happy Valley
- Suburb
- Interactive map of Happy Valley
- Coordinates: 41°20′02″S 174°45′25″E
- Country: New Zealand
- City: Wellington City
- Electoral ward: Southern Ward

Population (2013)
  - Total: 1,743

Brooklyn wind turbine	Kingston	Brooklyn
	Happy Valley	Island Bay
south coast	Ōwhiro Bay	Island Bay

Happy Valley is a subdivision of the Ōwhiro Bay suburb of Wellington, New Zealand. Although it is not an "official" suburb to the Wellington City Council, it is a main thoroughfare between Wellington city and Wellington's somewhat rugged and scenic southern coast. The name "Happy Valley" has been in use since the 1840s.

The statistical area of Happy Valley-Owhiro Bay had a population of 1,743 at the 2013 New Zealand census, an increase of 84 people since the 2006 census. There were 858 males and 885 females.

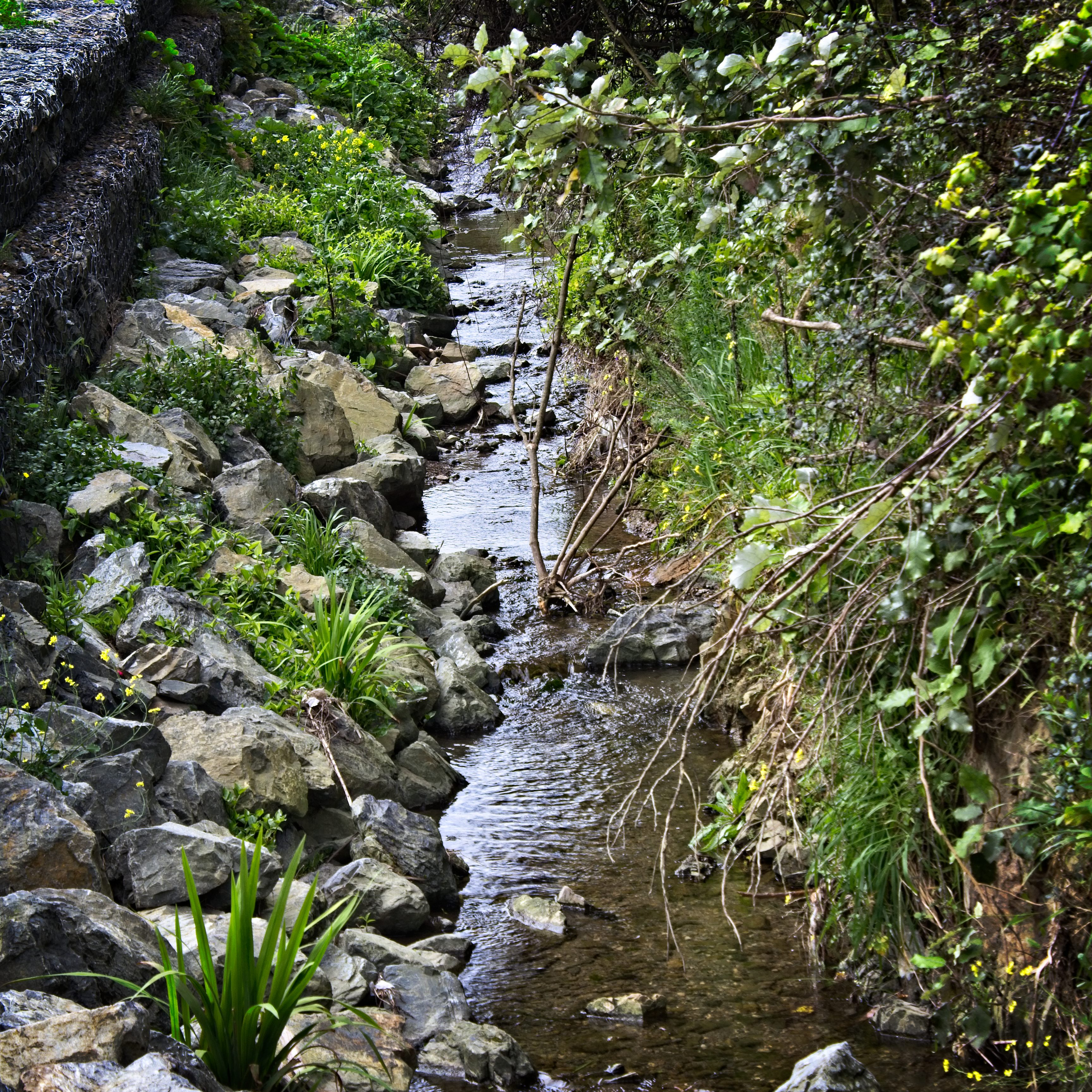
Stream restoration by Friends of the Owhiro Stream, Happy Valley

Happy Valley currently has a small eclectic Green community. There is an active community garden nearby the main waterway, the Owhiro Stream, between Ōwhiro Bay School and the coast. North Happy Valley has an active environmental care group called Friends of the Owhiro Stream (FOOS), formed in 2002. The group has done quite an amount of eco-renewal including weed control and planting along the riverbanks.

Wellington's municipal rubbish tip, the Southern Landfill, (also known as the Happy Valley Tip), is accessed from Happy Valley Road. The Tip Shop adjacent to the landfill opened in 1997. It sells second-hand goods that would otherwise be thrown away, and each year saves around 1000 tonnes of materials from going to the landfill.

As of 2024, Happy Valley is served by two public bus routes: no. 29, which runs all day, and no. 39, a peak-hour only service.

Happy Valley features in the opening and closing scenes of the World War II novel 'Lancewood', written by Alan Marshall, in which both penguins and cows are represented side by side on the beach.

== Education ==
The local primary school, Ōwhiro Bay School, is a co‑educational state contributing school for Years 1–6 located at 96 Happy Valley Road. As of May 2025 it had a roll of 89 students. The school and neighbouring Ōwhiro Bay Kindergarten have worked together since 2014 as a “One Learning Community”, sharing facilities and collaborative early childhood-to-primary schooling initiatives.
