= Mornington, Wellington =

Suburb of Wellington City, New Zealand

Mornington
- Suburb
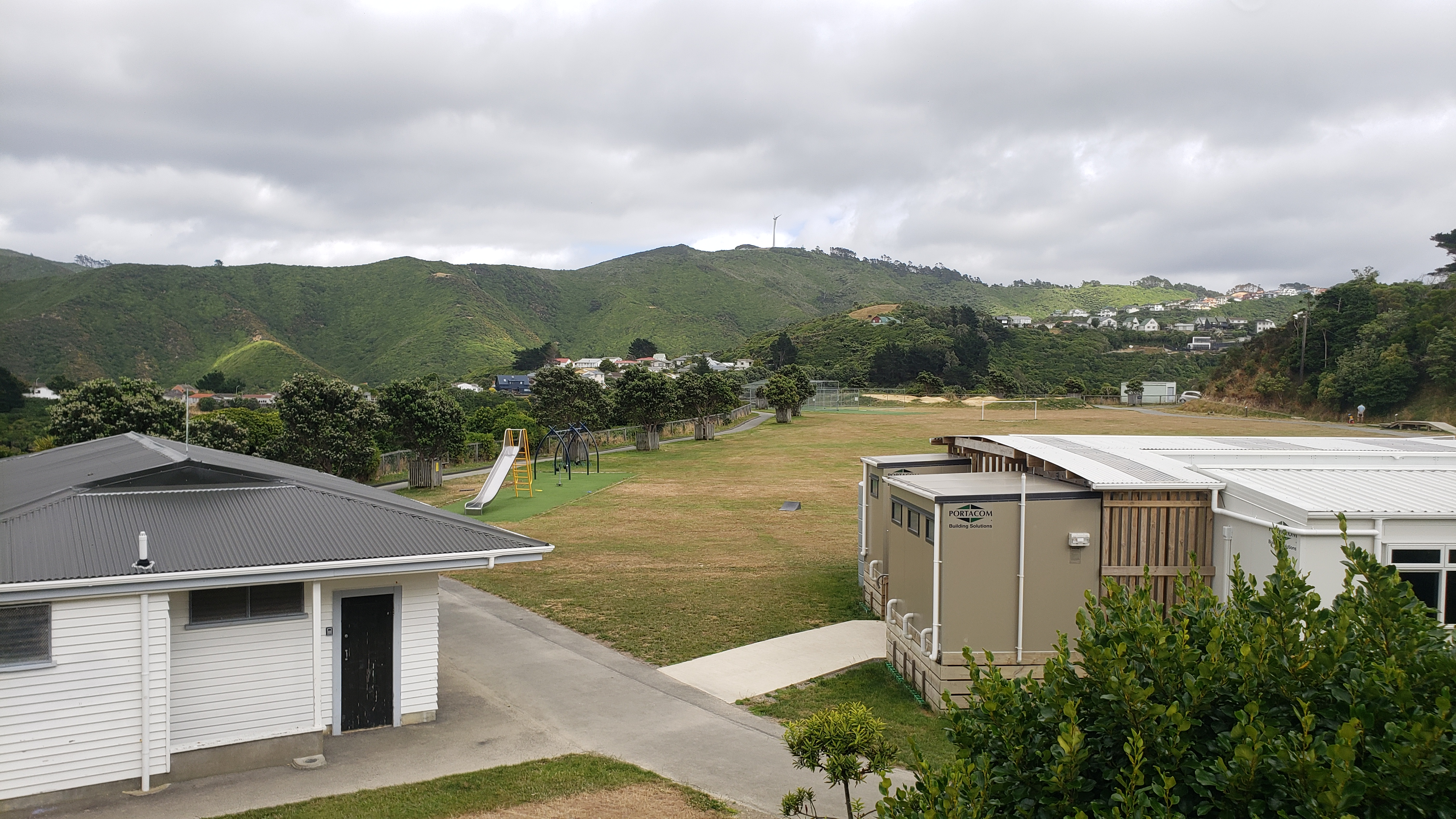
- Vogelmorn Park in Mornington
- Interactive map of Mornington
- Coordinates: 41°19′04″S 174°45′51″E
- Country: New Zealand
- City: Wellington City
- Local authority: Wellington City Council
- Electoral ward: Paekawakawa/Southern Ward; Te Whanganui-a-Tara Māori Ward
- Established: 1878

Area
  - Land: 30 ha (74 acres)

Population (2023 census)
  - Total: 897
  - Density: 3,000/km^{2} (7,700/sq mi)

Kowhai Park	Brooklyn	Vogeltown
	Mornington	Newtown
	Kingston	Berhampore

Mornington is a suburb of Wellington, New Zealand, on the southern hills behind Brooklyn. It is named after the Duke of Wellington's father, the Earl of Mornington. The original Mornington is in County Meath, and was the Irish seat of the Duke's father. It was named in 1878 from the time when J.F.E. Wright (1827–1891) subdivided his land in the south-west of the city in partnership with Jacob Joseph, and created the suburbs of Mornington and Vogeltown.

== Demographics ==
Mornington has an area of 0.30 km^{2} (0.12 sq mi) It is part of the larger Kingston-Mornington-Vogeltown statistical area.

Historical populations for Mornington
Year	Pop.	±% p.a.
2006	852	—
2013	849	−0.05%
2018	927	+1.77%
2023	897	−0.66%

Mornington had a population of 897 in the 2023 New Zealand census, a decrease of 30 people (−3.2%) since the 2018 census, and an increase of 48 people (5.7%) since the 2013 census. There were 417 males, 462 females, and 12 people of other genders in 354 dwellings. 11.4% of people identified as LGBTIQ+. There were 144 people (16.1%) aged under 15 years, 207 (23.1%) aged 15 to 29, 453 (50.5%) aged 30 to 64, and 93 (10.4%) aged 65 or older.

People could identify as more than one ethnicity. The results were 83.6% European (Pākehā); 9.0% Māori; 3.7% Pasifika; 12.4% Asian; 2.3% Middle Eastern, Latin American and African New Zealanders (MELAA); and 2.0% other, which includes people giving their ethnicity as "New Zealander". English was spoken by 96.0%, Māori by 2.3%, Samoan by 0.7%, and other languages by 18.7%. No language could be spoken by 1.7% (e.g. too young to talk). The percentage of people born overseas was 28.4, compared with 28.8% nationally.

Religious affiliations were 20.4% Christian, 3.7% Hindu, 0.3% Islam, 0.3% Māori religious beliefs, 0.7% Buddhist, 1.0% New Age, 0.7% Jewish, and 2.0% other religions. People who answered that they had no religion were 66.6%, and 4.0% of people did not answer the census question.

Of those at least 15 years old, 375 (49.8%) people had a bachelor's or higher degree, 300 (39.8%) had a post-high school certificate or diploma, and 78 (10.4%) people exclusively held high school qualifications. 189 people (25.1%) earned over $100,000 compared to 12.1% nationally. The employment status of those at least 15 was 477 (63.3%) full-time, 105 (13.9%) part-time, and 24 (3.2%) unemployed.

=== Kingston-Mornington-Vogeltown statistical area ===
Kingston-Mornington-Vogeltown statistical area, which includes Kingston and Vogeltown, covers 0.99 km^{2} (0.38 sq mi). It had an estimated population of 3,200 as of June 2025, with a population density of 3,232 people per km^{2}.

Historical populations for the statistical area
Year	Pop.	±% p.a.
2006	2,889	—
2013	2,928	+0.19%
2018	3,165	+1.57%
2023	3,147	−0.11%

Kingston-Mornington-Vogeltown had a population of 3,147 in the 2023 New Zealand census, a decrease of 18 people (−0.6%) since the 2018 census, and an increase of 219 people (7.5%) since the 2013 census. There were 1,539 males, 1,563 females, and 48 people of other genders in 1,224 dwellings. 9.8% of people identified as LGBTIQ+. The median age was 35.9 years (compared with 38.1 years nationally). There were 483 people (15.3%) aged under 15 years, 741 (23.5%) aged 15 to 29, 1,605 (51.0%) aged 30 to 64, and 318 (10.1%) aged 65 or older.

People could identify as more than one ethnicity. The results were 77.3% European (Pākehā); 8.3% Māori; 4.7% Pasifika; 17.8% Asian; 2.7% Middle Eastern, Latin American and African New Zealanders (MELAA); and 1.8% other, which includes people giving their ethnicity as "New Zealander". English was spoken by 96.9%, Māori by 2.8%, Samoan by 1.1%, and other languages by 21.9%. No language could be spoken by 1.8% (e.g. too young to talk). New Zealand Sign Language was known by 0.5%. The percentage of people born overseas was 31.7, compared with 28.8% nationally.

Religious affiliations were 21.3% Christian, 5.1% Hindu, 0.8% Islam, 0.3% Māori religious beliefs, 1.0% Buddhist, 0.7% New Age, 0.2% Jewish, and 2.5% other religions. People who answered that they had no religion were 63.3%, and 4.9% of people did not answer the census question.

Of those at least 15 years old, 1,266 (47.5%) people had a bachelor's or higher degree, 1,044 (39.2%) had a post-high school certificate or diploma, and 354 (13.3%) people exclusively held high school qualifications. The median income was $58,100, compared with $41,500 nationally. 612 people (23.0%) earned over $100,000 compared to 12.1% nationally. The employment status of those at least 15 was 1,716 (64.4%) full-time, 333 (12.5%) part-time, and 75 (2.8%) unemployed.

== Education ==
Te Kura o Tawatawa - Ridgway School is a co-educational state primary school for Year 1 to 8 students, with a roll of 212 as of October 2025. It opened in 1929 as Ridgway School. The name changed to Te Kura o Tawatawa - Ridgway School in 2023.
