= Melrose, New Zealand =

Suburb of Wellington City, New Zealand

Melrose
- Suburb
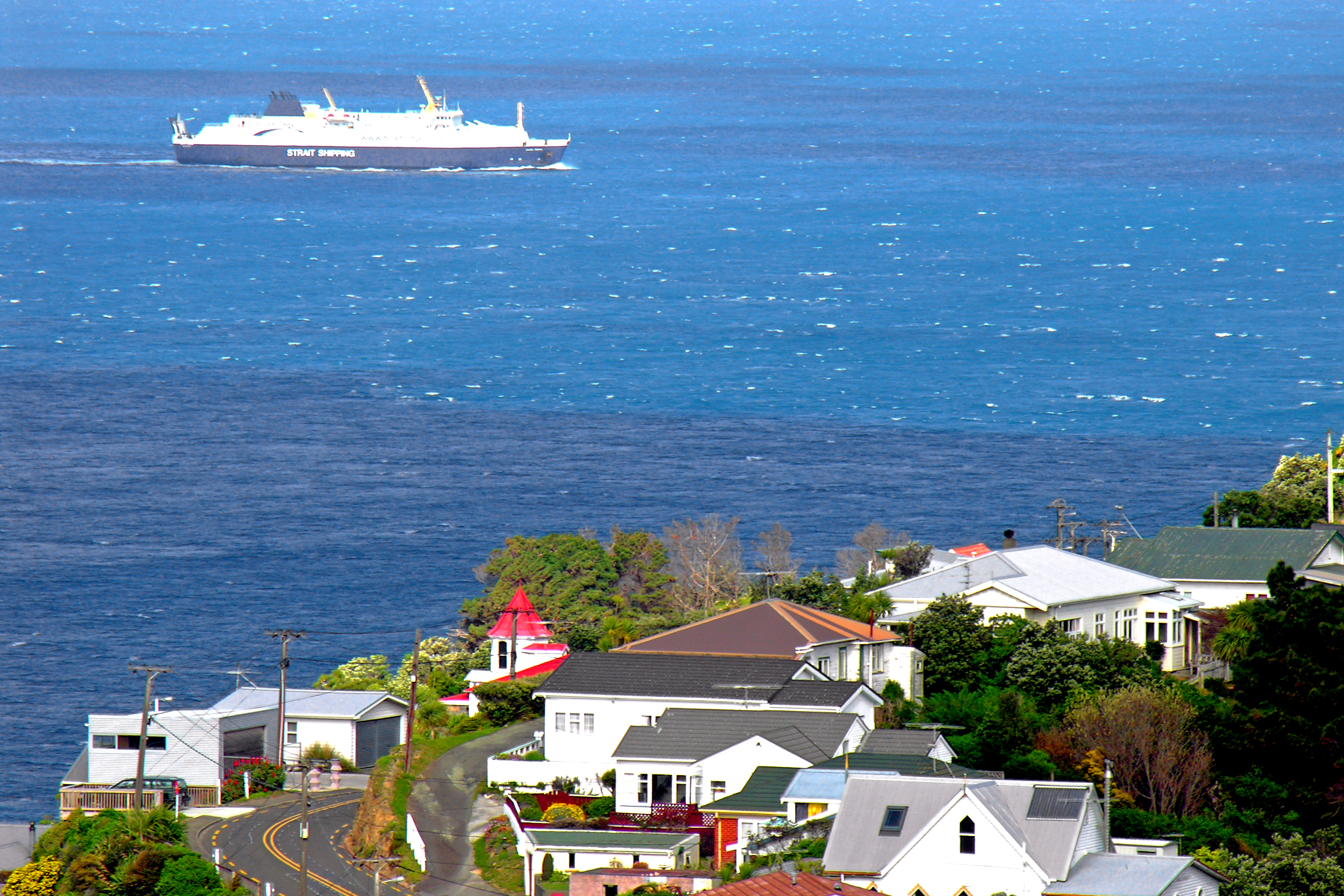
- Cook Strait from Melrose
- Interactive map of Melrose
- Coordinates: 41°19′21″S 174°47′20″E
- Country: New Zealand
- City: Wellington City
- Local authority: Wellington City Council
- Electoral ward: Motukairangi/Eastern Ward; Te Whanganui-a-Tara Māori Ward

Area
  - Land: 33 ha (82 acres)

Population (June 2025)
  - Total: 1,240
  - Density: 3,800/km^{2} (9,700/sq mi)

Newtown		Kilbirnie
Berhampore	Melrose	Rongotai
Island Bay	Southgate	Lyall Bay

Melrose is a suburb of Wellington, New Zealand. It is south of the city centre, Berhampore and Newtown, and is in the Eastern Ward. Although adjacent to Lyall Bay, it does not have seafront access to the bay.

== History ==
In 1879 the Melrose Estate was put up for auction. The land had belonged to Alexander Sutherland who died in 1877, and was sold to Mace and Jackson and then a syndicate known as Melrose Proprietors. Like James Coutts Crawford's subdivision of the Seatoun township on the Miramar Peninsula, there were few buyers because of difficult access. Crawford's earlier auction of Kilbirnie sections in 1874 had attracted mainly speculators buying cheap land rather than would-be homeowners.

The Melrose Borough was established in 1888 from the earlier Kilbirnie Road Board, to serve a horseshoe-shaped and largely rural area stretching from Upland Farm (later Kelburn) through Brooklyn and Island Bay and to areas later called Haitaitai and Roseneath. Initially it was to be called the Borough of Southend.

The borough experienced rapid growth from the early 1890s, mainly in Kilbirnie, Brooklyn and Island Bay. Amalgamation with Wellington City would avoid large borough debt for amenities like drainage, water supply and a separate electric tramway system. Wellington City was planning an electric tramway system to replace the private horse tramways, and purchased them in 1902 (the first electric line was opened in 1904).

In June 1902 a poll of Melrose residents agreed to join the Wellington City Council, and amalgamation proceeded in 1903. Extension of new electric tramway to the area plus water supply and sewerage was promised within three years, although held up by Island Bay "malcontents" wanting a firm commitment of a tramway extension to Island Bay.

There was a "boom" in house construction in Melrose and Kilbirnie in 1907.

In 2013 the population reached 1,215 in the 34-hectare (84-acre) land area.

The Wellington ward boundaries split Melrose between the Motukairangi/Eastern Ward and the Paekawakawa/ Southern Ward.

== Demographics ==
Melrose statistical area covers 0.33 km^{2} (0.13 sq mi). It had an estimated population of 1,240 as of June 2025, with a population density of 3,758 people per km^{2}.

Historical population
Year	Pop.	±% p.a.
2006	1,182	—
2013	1,212	+0.36%
2018	1,299	+1.40%
2023	1,239	−0.94%

Melrose had a population of 1,239 in the 2023 New Zealand census, a decrease of 60 people (−4.6%) since the 2018 census, and an increase of 27 people (2.2%) since the 2013 census. There were 579 males, 639 females, and 24 people of other genders in 486 dwellings. 11.6% of people identified as LGBTIQ+. The median age was 36.1 years (compared with 38.1 years nationally). There were 198 people (16.0%) aged under 15 years, 282 (22.8%) aged 15 to 29, 639 (51.6%) aged 30 to 64, and 120 (9.7%) aged 65 or older.

People could identify as more than one ethnicity. The results were 88.1% European (Pākehā); 10.4% Māori; 3.4% Pasifika; 6.5% Asian; 2.2% Middle Eastern, Latin American and African New Zealanders (MELAA); and 1.2% other, which includes people giving their ethnicity as "New Zealander". English was spoken by 97.6%, Māori by 2.7%, Samoan by 1.2%, and other languages by 15.5%. No language could be spoken by 1.9% (e.g. too young to talk). New Zealand Sign Language was known by 0.7%. The percentage of people born overseas was 28.8, compared with 28.8% nationally.

Religious affiliations were 18.6% Christian, 1.2% Hindu, 1.0% Islam, 1.2% Māori religious beliefs, 0.5% Buddhist, 0.7% New Age, 0.2% Jewish, and 1.2% other religions. People who answered that they had no religion were 70.7%, and 5.1% of people did not answer the census question.

Of those at least 15 years old, 576 (55.3%) people had a bachelor's or higher degree, 348 (33.4%) had a post-high school certificate or diploma, and 114 (11.0%) people exclusively held high school qualifications. The median income was $63,400, compared with $41,500 nationally. 300 people (28.8%) earned over $100,000 compared to 12.1% nationally. The employment status of those at least 15 was 681 (65.4%) full-time, 138 (13.3%) part-time, and 30 (2.9%) unemployed.

== Notable Features ==
=== Mount Albert ===
Mount Albert serves as a water distribution location to the surrounding suburbs from the Mt Albert reservoir. In 2016 the original 1910 810 litre tank was replaced with a 2.2 million litre tank built underground beside another above ground tank built in 1955.

The Wellington town belt reserve runs along the top of Melrose, backing on to the Wellington Zoological gardens. Mt Albert is part of this reserve and includes biking and walking opportunities along the Southern walkway. There is an off-leash dog exercise area part way up Mt Albert and a specialised mountain biking track has been built in the reserve by local volunteers.

=== Melrose Park ===
Melrose Park is located on Sutherland Crescent. Football is played here, there is an artificial surface for cricket and the park also contains a playground and changing rooms.

=== Truby King House ===
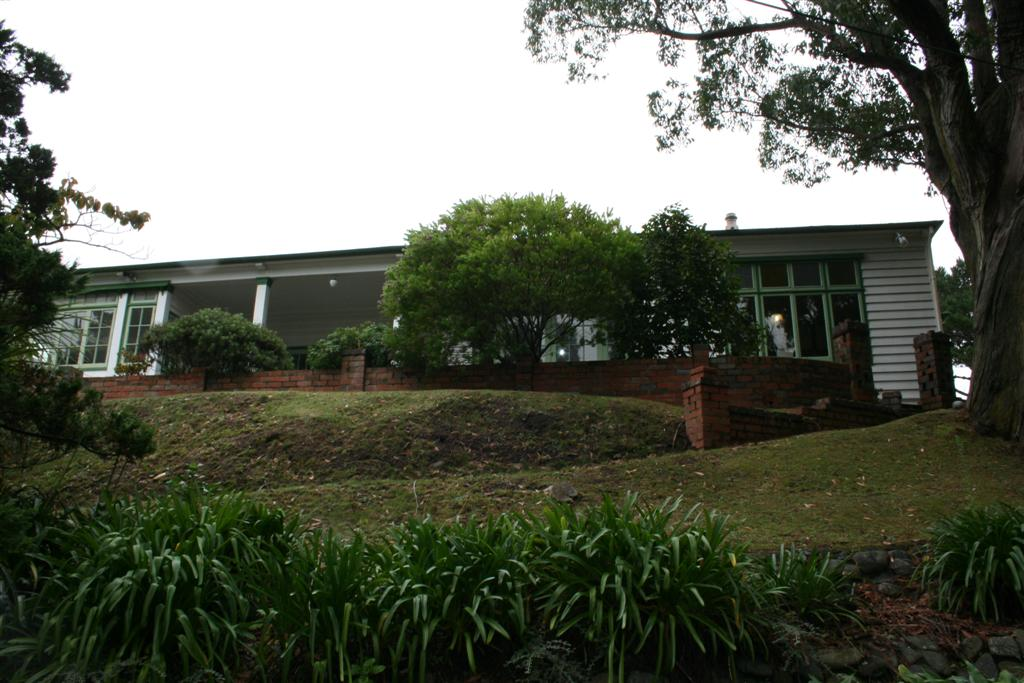
Truby King house

Truby King Park is off Manchester Street in Melrose, the homestead is now managed by Wellington City Council but was previously home to the founder of the Plunket Society and features many plaques and memorials to the work Sir Truby King and his wife Lady Isabella King undertook. Both are interred at a mausoleum on the 1.4-hectare (3.5-acre) site.

== Activities ==
The Melrose suburb is part of the Predator Free Lyall Bay, Rongatai and Melrose group. Through backyard trapping, this group aims to help New Zealand native species become reestablished within Wellington.
