= Kingston, Wellington =

Kingston
- Suburb
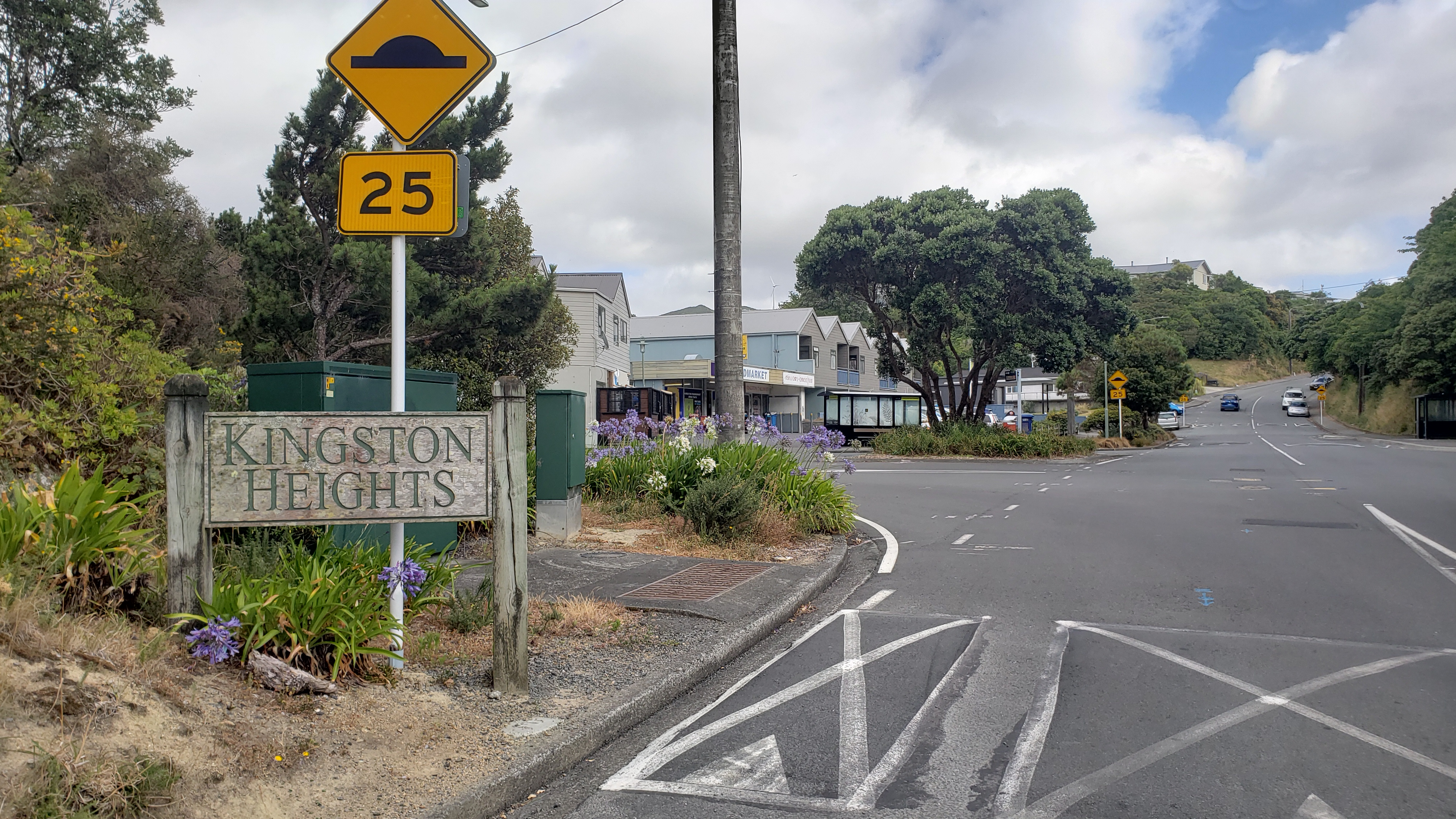
- Interactive map of Kingston
- Coordinates: 41°19′25″S 174°45′49″E
- Country: New Zealand
- City: Wellington City
- Electoral ward: Paekawakawa/Southern Ward

Area
  - Land: 35 ha (86 acres)

Population (2023 census)
  - Total: 1,107
  - Density: 3,200/km^{2} (8,200/sq mi)

Berhampore	Brooklyn, Mornington
	Kingston	Melrose
	Happy Valley

Kingston is a southern suburb of Wellington, New Zealand, south of Brooklyn and Mornington. The suburb was developed in the 1960s, when there was more "cut and fill" earthworks in new subdivisions to provide flat sections. In 2013 and 2017 there were slips of unstable land, and a Wellington City Council spokesman blamed the "cut and fill" for the slips, though after a previous slip some local residents suggested that broken or faulty water mains or stormwater drains could be responsible. In 2014 a "slip-prone" Kingston house was demolished. A lot of streets in Kingston have names associated with Canada, such as Vancouver Street and Caribou Place.

Between 2017 and 2021 the median house sale price in Kingston increased from $772,000 to $1,080,000.

As of 2021, the Kingston shops consist of a dairy, a fish and chip shop and a mechanic. The nearest post office is NZ Post Centre Island Bay.

== Demographics ==
Kingston covers 0.35 km^{2} (0.14 sq mi). It is part of the Kingston-Mornington-Vogeltown statistical area.

Historical population
Year	Pop.	±% p.a.
2006	1,074	—
2013	1,014	−0.82%
2018	1,107	+1.77%
2023	1,107	+0.00%

Kingston had a population of 1,107 in the 2023 New Zealand census, unchanged since the 2018 census, and an increase of 93 people (9.2%) since the 2013 census. There were 552 males, 534 females, and 15 people of other genders in 435 dwellings. 7.3% of people identified as LGBTIQ+. There were 177 people (16.0%) aged under 15 years, 237 (21.4%) aged 15 to 29, 573 (51.8%) aged 30 to 64, and 126 (11.4%) aged 65 or older.

People could identify as more than one ethnicity. The results were 62.9% European (Pākehā); 8.9% Māori; 6.2% Pasifika; 29.5% Asian; 2.4% Middle Eastern, Latin American and African New Zealanders (MELAA); and 1.6% other, which includes people giving their ethnicity as "New Zealander". English was spoken by 95.7%, Māori by 3.0%, Samoan by 2.2%, and other languages by 29.5%. No language could be spoken by 2.7% (e.g. too young to talk). New Zealand Sign Language was known by 0.8%. The percentage of people born overseas was 36.0, compared with 28.8% nationally.

Religious affiliations were 23.3% Christian, 9.2% Hindu, 1.6% Islam, 0.5% Māori religious beliefs, 2.7% Buddhist, 1.1% New Age, 0.3% Jewish, and 2.7% other religions. People who answered that they had no religion were 53.7%, and 4.9% of people did not answer the census question.

Of those at least 15 years old, 393 (42.3%) people had a bachelor's or higher degree, 378 (40.6%) had a post-high school certificate or diploma, and 165 (17.7%) people exclusively held high school qualifications. 177 people (19.0%) earned over $100,000 compared to 12.1% nationally. The employment status of those at least 15 was 582 (62.6%) full-time, 114 (12.3%) part-time, and 15 (1.6%) unemployed.
