= Brooklyn, Wellington =

Suburb of Wellington City, New Zealand

Brooklyn
- Suburb
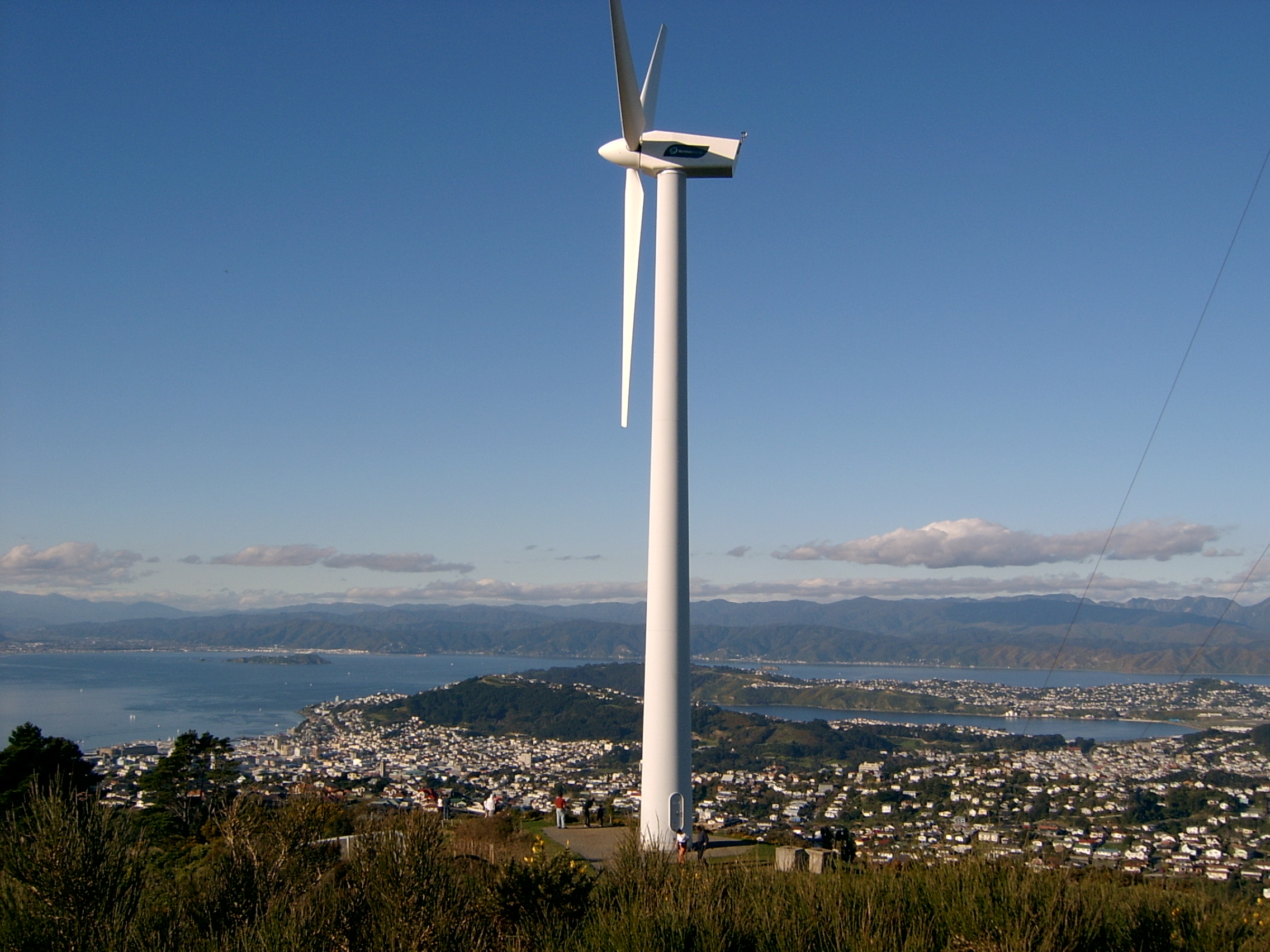
- Interactive map of Brooklyn
- Coordinates: 41°18′22″S 174°45′47″E
- Country: New Zealand
- City: Wellington City
- Local authority: Wellington City Council
- Electoral ward: Paekawakawa/Southern Ward; Te Whanganui-a-Tara Māori Ward
- Established: 1888

Area
  - Land: 398 ha (980 acres)

Population (June 2025)
  - Total: 6,810
  - Density: 1,710/km^{2} (4,430/sq mi)
- Postcode: 6021

	Aro Valley	Mount Cook
Karori	Brooklyn	Vogeltown
Ōwhiro Bay		Mornington, Kingston

Brooklyn is a suburb of Wellington, the capital city of New Zealand, under the governance of Wellington City Council. It lies 3 km south of Wellington's central business district on the eastern slopes of the hills above Happy Valley. It is located to the south of Aro Valley and Highbury, west of Mount Cook, north of Vogeltown, Mornington and Ōwhiro Bay and east of Kowhai Park, Panorama Heights, Mitchelltown and Karori.

It was named after the borough of Brooklyn, New York which in turn was named after the village of Breukelen, Utrecht, the Netherlands.

== History ==
=== Māori history ===
In pre-European times, Māori knew the Brooklyn hills as Turanga-rere, translated as "the waving plumes of the war-party". The historian James Cowan, in investigating the original Māori names for places in and around Wellington City, suggested this referred to how the tall trees moved in the wind, as "when the warriors stood up to dance... all their feather hair-adornments would wave to and fro".

The small Te Atiawa village of Moera, or Moe-i-te-rā ("Sleeping in the sun") was sited in the area now covered by Maarama Crescent. (The name was later transferred to the suburb of Moera in Lower Hutt.) The Omaroro kūmara gardens were situated where Connaught Terrace is today.

Brooklyn and the wider Wellington region then and now hosted a number of iwi, or tribes, all represented through a Charter of Understanding with Wellington Regional Council signed in July 2000 (and replacing the original Charter of Understanding of 1993):

- Ngāti Kahungunu ki Wairarapa
- Te Atiawa/ Taranaki Whānui ki te Upoko o te Ika
- Ngāti Toa Rangātira
- Te Ati Awa ki Whakarongotai
- Ngāti Raukawa ki te Tonga
- Rangitāne o Wairarapa

In 2013, a Memorandum of Partnership was agreed between the tangata whenua of Te Upoko o te Ika a Maui, or tangata whenua of the region, and the Wellington Regional Council. This built on and replaced the Charter of Understanding.

=== European settlement ===
European settlement began in the area during the 1840s. In January 1842 the New Zealand Company ship London commanded by Captain Attwood set sail for its second voyage to Wellington from Gravesend in Kent. It carried 700 tons of cargo, 137 adults and 39 children. On 1 May 1842 the ship arrived in Wellington, with John and Louisa Fitchett and their seven children amongst the passengers.

The New Zealand Company divided the new settlement into 100-acre blocks. The district of Ohiro developed in the early 1840s from three of these blocks (Ohiro Sections 11,12 and 13) on the land surrounding Port Nicholson (officially renamed Wellington Harbour in 1980). Settlers could access the new district only via the steep Ohiro Road from present-day Aro Street. In 1847, John Fitchett purchased Section 11 and established a dairy farm called Ohiro Farm, known also as Fitchett's Farm. A township named Fitchett Town formed in the 1860s; it gained its new name "Brooklyn" in 1888 when the then land-owners, Ashton B. Fitchett (son of John Fitchett d.1875) and R.B. Todman, offered the main subdivision for sale. The offer included 208 lots of Fitchett's Farm next to Brooklyn.

In 1899, after the sale, a further subdivision took place, and the main roads of Mitchell and Todman Streets took form. These were then intersected with Reuben, Bruce, Laura and Charlotte Avenues, Tanera Crescent, Apuka Street and Sugar Loaf Road (the site of the War Memorial). In 1902 Brooklyn was extended further up the Brooklyn Hills when Ashton B. Fitchett sold additional lots of land. Both Karepa and Apuka Streets were extended onto this newly available land. Brooklyn was connected with the city water supply on 24 October 1907, with the pumping station situated on Epuni Street.

A new tramway route opened in May 1906. Unlike the existing route to Brooklyn via Aro Street and Ohiro Road which had excessively steep gradients, the new route was cut through the town belt by Central Park. This route later became today's Brooklyn Road. On 3 May 1907, a tram crashed on the Brooklyn hill due to brake failure and one passenger was killed. The tramway closed in 1957, and the City - Brooklyn route is now served by numbers 7 and 17 buses. The number 7 (City - Brooklyn - Kingston) route was electrified as part of the Wellington City trolley bus service which then was terminated in 2017.

Brooklyn takes its name from the borough in New York City, which in turn recalls the Dutch city Breukelen.

== Demographics ==
Brooklyn, comprising the statistical areas of Brooklyn North, Brooklyn East and Brooklyn South, covers 3.98 km^{2} (1.54 sq mi). It had an estimated population of 6,810 as of June 2025, with a population density of 1,711 people per km^{2}.

Historical population
Year	Pop.	±% p.a.
2006	6,123	—
2013	6,504	+0.87%
2018	6,711	+0.63%
2023	6,669	−0.13%

Brooklyn had a population of 6,669 in the 2023 New Zealand census, a decrease of 42 people (−0.6%) since the 2018 census, and an increase of 165 people (2.5%) since the 2013 census. There were 3,222 males, 3,360 females, and 87 people of other genders in 2,568 dwellings. 11.2% of people identified as LGBTIQ+. The median age was 34.7 years (compared with 38.1 years nationally). There were 939 people (14.1%) aged under 15 years, 1,830 (27.4%) aged 15 to 29, 3,252 (48.8%) aged 30 to 64, and 651 (9.8%) aged 65 or older.

People could identify as more than one ethnicity. The results were 80.9% European (Pākehā); 8.6% Māori; 3.6% Pasifika; 14.3% Asian; 3.5% Middle Eastern, Latin American and African New Zealanders (MELAA); and 1.5% other, which includes people giving their ethnicity as "New Zealander". English was spoken by 97.0%, Māori by 2.3%, Samoan by 0.9%, and other languages by 20.6%. No language could be spoken by 1.8% (e.g. too young to talk). New Zealand Sign Language was known by 0.6%. The percentage of people born overseas was 29.6, compared with 28.8% nationally.

Religious affiliations were 20.6% Christian, 3.3% Hindu, 1.1% Islam, 0.3% Māori religious beliefs, 0.9% Buddhist, 0.5% New Age, 0.7% Jewish, and 1.5% other religions. People who answered that they had no religion were 66.8%, and 4.6% of people did not answer the census question.

Of those at least 15 years old, 3,165 (55.2%) people had a bachelor's or higher degree, 2,001 (34.9%) had a post-high school certificate or diploma, and 570 (9.9%) people exclusively held high school qualifications. The median income was $63,400, compared with $41,500 nationally. 1,629 people (28.4%) earned over $100,000 compared to 12.1% nationally. The employment status of those at least 15 was 3,648 (63.7%) full-time, 825 (14.4%) part-time, and 138 (2.4%) unemployed.

Individual statistical areas
Name	Area (km^{2})	Population	Density (per km^{2})	Dwellings	Median age	Median income
Brooklyn North	1.25	2,103	1,682	792	35.4 years	$63,800
Brooklyn East	0.90	2,655	2,950	1,077	35.7 years	$63,500
Brooklyn South	1.83	1,908	1,043	699	33.0 years	$63,000
New Zealand					38.1 years	$41,500

== Politics ==
Brooklyn is within the Wellington City Council's Paekawakawa/Southern General Ward and is currently represented on the council by two councillors: Laurie Foon and Nureddin Abdurahman.

Brooklyn was a parliamentary electorate from 1946 to 1954. For general elections today, most of Brooklyn is located within the Wellington Central general and Te Tai Tonga Māori parliamentary electorates. Since the 2023 New Zealand general election, the Wellington Central electorate has been represented by Tamatha Paul, while Tākuta Ferris has been the Member of Parliament for Te Tai Tonga since 2023.

== Landmarks and features ==
=== Parks and Town Belt ===
- Central Park. Named after the area of the same name in New York, it separates Brooklyn from the city. Established in 1913 on Town Belt land, and opened on Labour Day, 27 October 1913, the park features a set of wrought-iron gates at its main entrance: the then Mayor, John Pearce Luke donated them in 1920. During World War II, American forces established a military camp in the park between 1942 and 1944. In October 1942 building work started with an initial requirement to accommodate 416 men of the US Marine Corps. The partly built camp could accept some occupants by 22 November 1942, and by July 1943 it could accommodate 540 personnel. The US Marines requested a further expansion of the camp, but the improving military situation precluded the expansion.
- Tanera Park. Lies to the north and north-west of Central Park on the opposite side of Ohiro Road. The park has sports facilities, including soccer, cricket, and artificial surfaces as well as changing-rooms. In 1991 the Wellington City Council set aside some of the park as trial to help low-income families and community-organisations to grow their own vegetables. The gardens, currently including 33 plots, have become known as the Tanera Community Gardens; the Mokai Kainga Trust manages them.
- Elliott Park. Lies on the western side of Brooklyn, adjacent to Mitchell Street and Karepa Street. The park used to have a children's play-ground, however the play-ground has been removed by the Wellington City Council and not replaced. The park was donated by Mr Elliott who used to have his farm in this place. There are still also wild pigs and goats that live on the bottom of the hills.

=== Brooklyn Hill ===
Brooklyn Hill is 299 metres (981 ft) high.

=== Hawkins Hill ===
Hawkins Hill is 495 metres (1,624 ft) high. It is the highest point on Wellington's southern hills and the site of a white radar dome that can be seen from many parts of the city.

=== Wind turbine ===
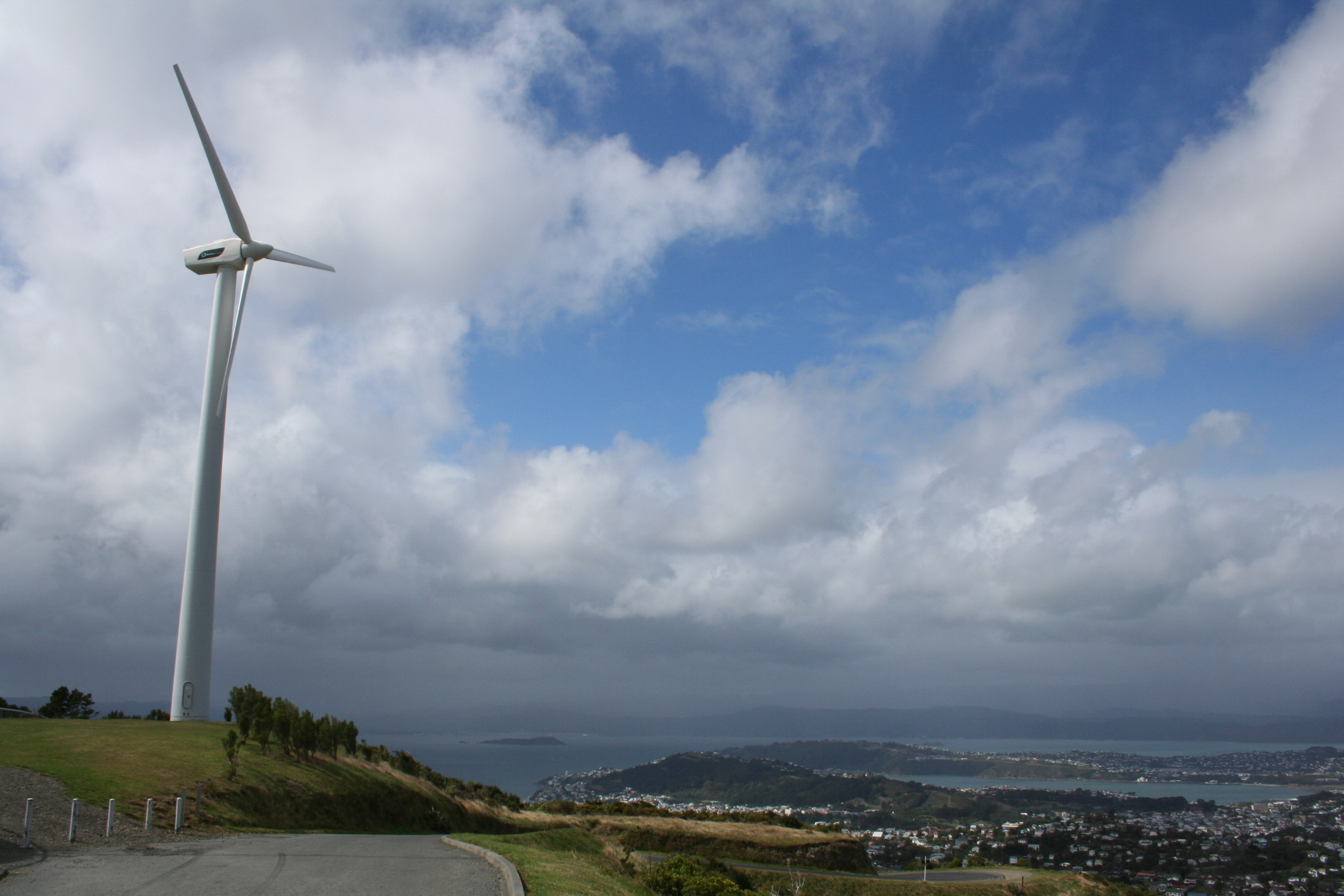
The original Brooklyn wind-turbine, with Matiu/Somes Island, Mount Victoria and the Miramar Peninsula in the background

The Electricity Corporation of New Zealand installed the Brooklyn wind turbine on Polhill above north-western Brooklyn in March 1993 as part of a research project into wind-power generation. The Corporation chose the Brooklyn site due to Wellington's "higher than normal" wind patterns and to gain maximum exposure in the viewshed of Wellingtonians. The turbine, visible from many parts of the city, stands 299 metres above sea level. It became the oldest operating wind turbine in New Zealand

The original turbine was decommissioned in 2015 due to age, and replaced in 2016 with a larger version. The original turbine, a Vestas Wind Systems A/S turbine, was a relatively small machine compared with other turbines now installed in New Zealand, such as those at Te Āpiti Wind Farm, with an installed capacity of 225 kW. The present turbine, a German Enercon E-44, has a capacity of 900 kW, enough to power around 490 homes, with the power generated going into the local network for general distribution. The tower hub is 44m high and the blades are 20.8m long.

Meridian Energy has managed the turbine since its formation as a company in 1999 with the deregulation of the New Zealand electricity market.

=== War memorial ===
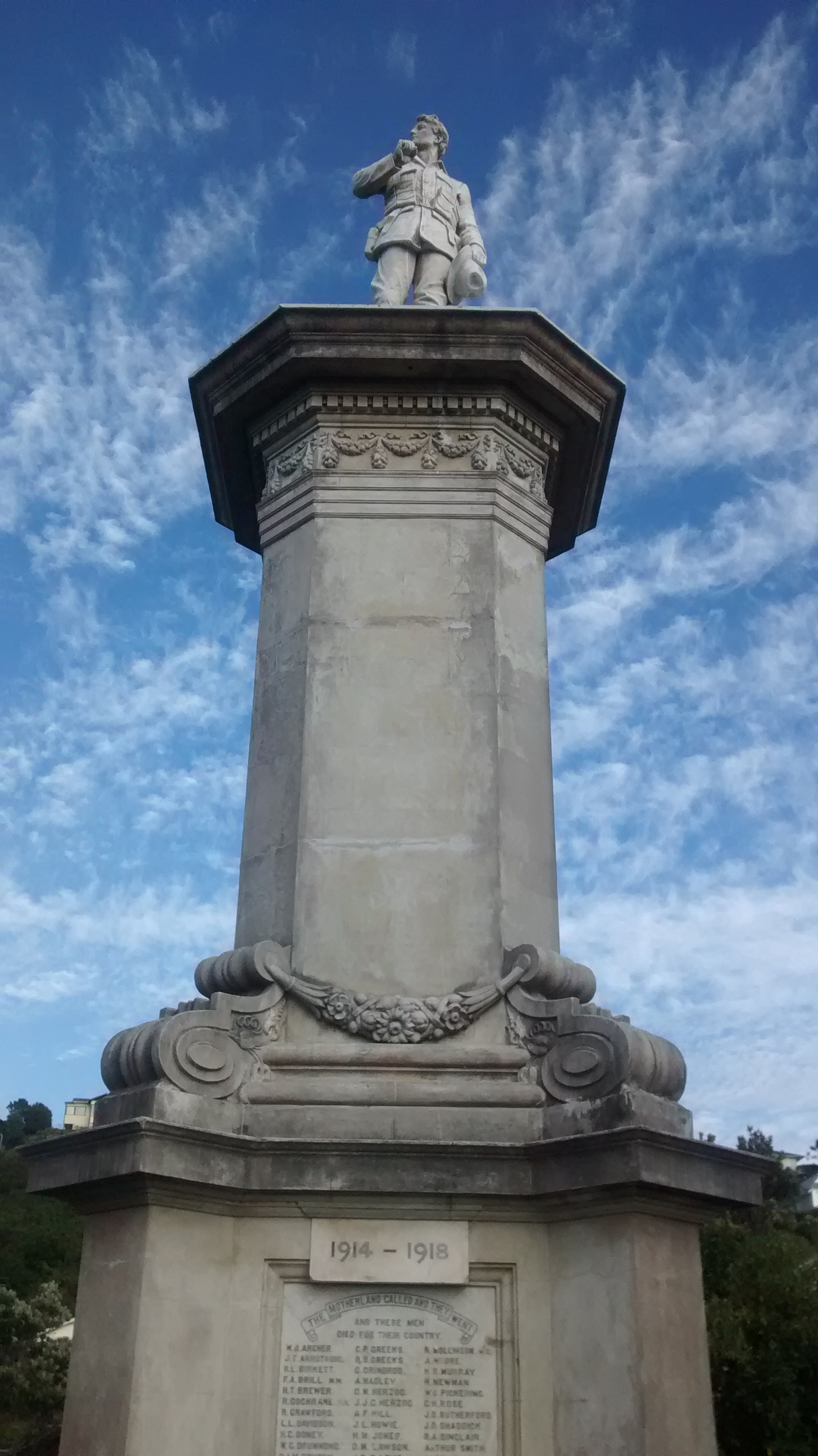
The Brooklyn War Memorial

Brooklyn's World War I war memorial overlooks northern Brooklyn from the top of Sugarloaf Hill. It lists the names of the 48 Brooklyn soldiers who died in that war.

Soon after the war ended in 1918 a movement to build a memorial began, with the funds raised in two years. The Brooklyn Returned Services Association (RSA) chose as a monument a carved marble statue depicting a soldier with hat in hand, looking towards the harbour heads through which sailed the troopships bearing those who would not return. The foundation stone was laid on 25 April 1922 by Colonel George Mitchell D.S.O. MP, and the memorial was unveiled by Governor-General Viscount Jellicoe on 23 September 1923.

For around 16 years, a board of trustees maintained the memorial, before passing it over to Wellington City Council. In 2003 a nine-month restoration took place, which involved re-securing the structure to the concrete pads that it stands on as well as cleaning, restoring plasterwork, removal of rust and replacing parts that had gone missing.

The inscription on the pedestal reads:

The motherland called and they went and these men died for their country.

==== Polhill gun emplacements ====
The well-preserved Polhill anti-aircraft gun emplacements date from March 1942: built for the capital's defence in response to fears of Japanese air-raids or invasion. Once completed the battery had accommodation for 109 army personnel.

The battery stands slightly north of the wind turbine within Panorama Heights subdivision, on a site allocated as reserve land. The site backs on to the firebreak running around the Zealandia wildlife sanctuary.

Street names

When a syndicate led by J.F.E. Wright (a Wellington Provincial Councillor between 1861 and 1863, and then for Karori and Mākara between 1873 and 1876) subdivided Brooklyn, it named a number of its streets after former US Presidents:

- Grover Cleveland (in office: 1885-1889 and 1893–1897) - Cleveland Street
- Calvin Coolidge (in office: 1923–1929) - Coolidge Street
- James Garfield - Garfield Street
- William Henry Harrison - Harrison Street
- Herbert Hoover (in office: 1929–1933) - Hoover Street
- Thomas Jefferson - Jefferson Street
- Abraham Lincoln - Lincoln Street
- William McKinley - McKinley Crescent
- William Taft - Taft Street
- George Washington - Washington Avenue

Street names with connections to the Fitchett family include Bruce Avenue (named after Bruce Fitchett, grandson of John Fitchett), Laura Avenue (after Laura Walters, who married Ashton B.Fitchett) and Helen Street (after Helen Fitchett, daughter of Ashton B.Fitchett). Reuben Avenue was named after Reuben Short, a long-time employee of John Fitchett. Karepa Street, Apuka Street and Tanera Crescent were named after local Māori who were also employed by John Fitchett. Bretby Street was named after John Fitchett's birthplace in Derbyshire.

=== Gallery ===
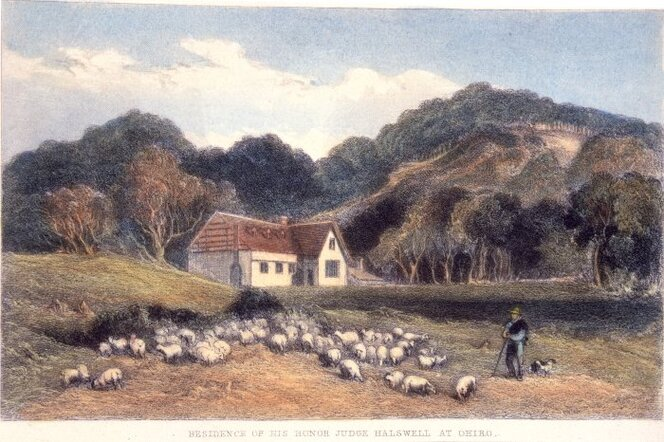
Residence of Judge Halswell in Brooklyn, then known as Ohiro District (1847)

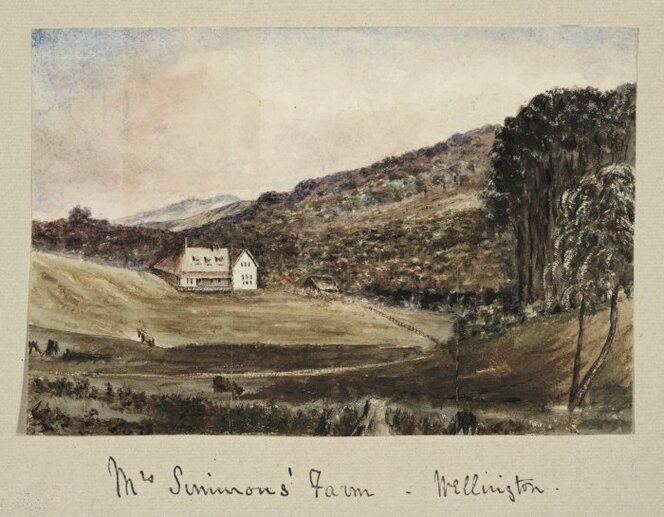
Mrs Jane Symons' farm, on approximately the modern site of Brooklyn School, between 1852 and 1856

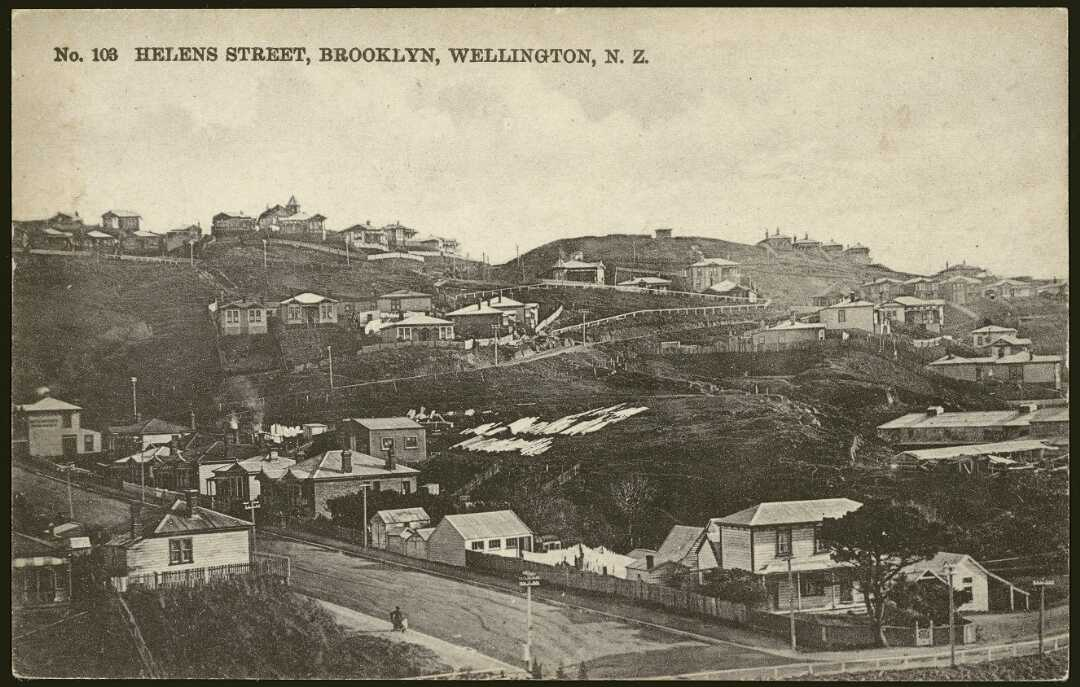
Helen Street, Brooklyn, circa 1910

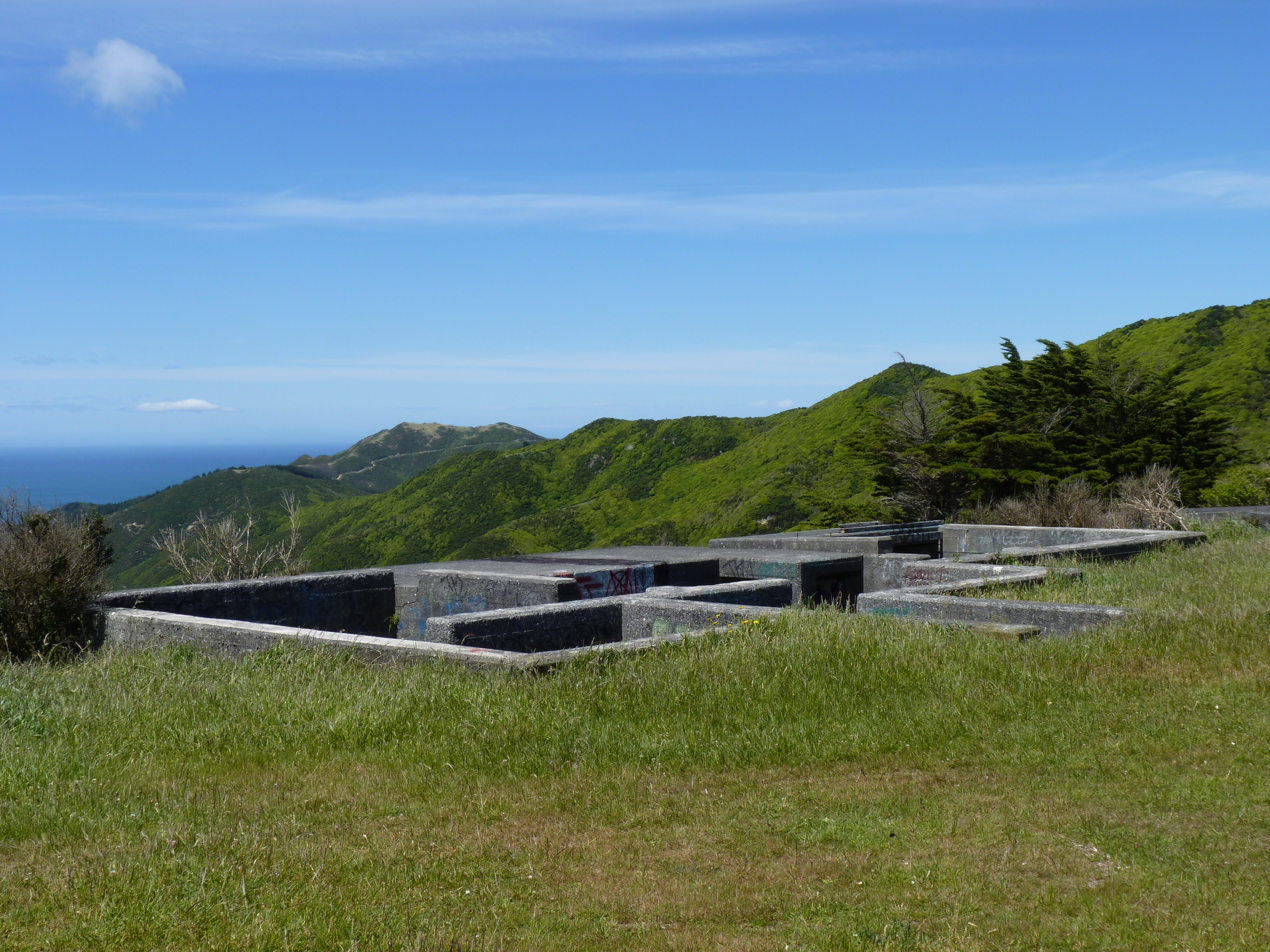
Polhill anti-aircraft gun batteries, Brooklyn, Wellington

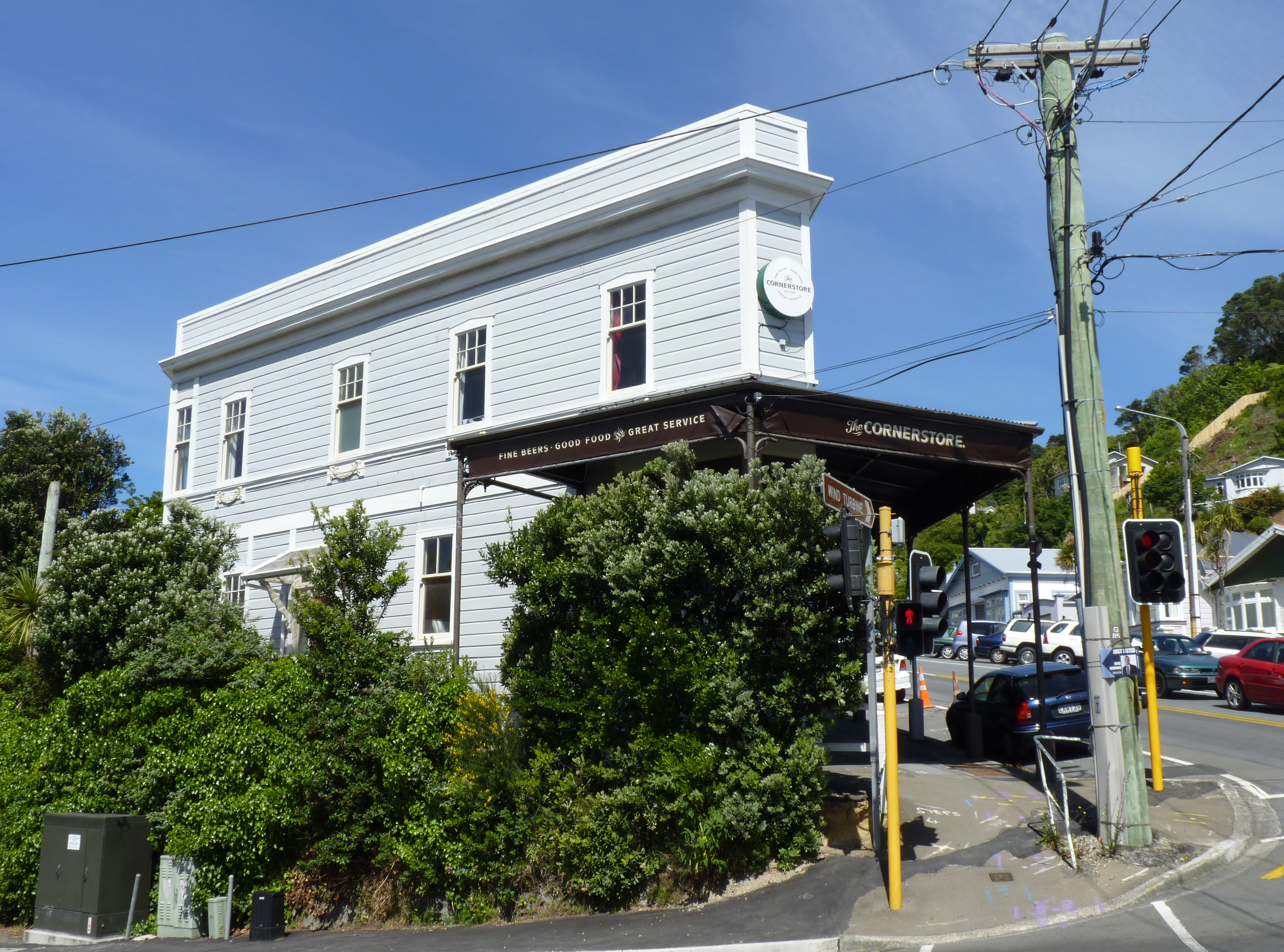
Building on corner of Todman St and Ohiro Rd, Brooklyn

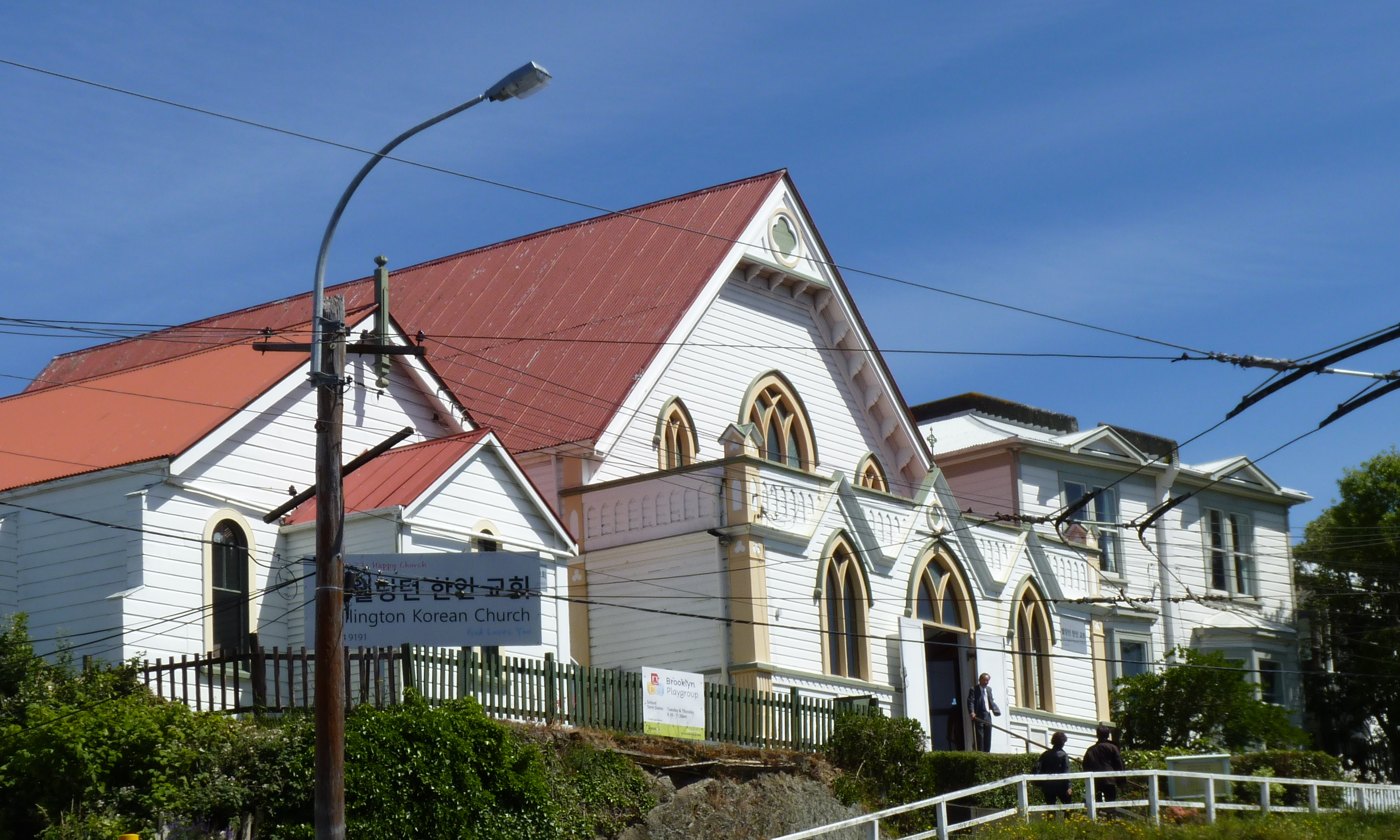
Wellington Korean Church: 184 Ohiro Road, Brooklyn, Wellington

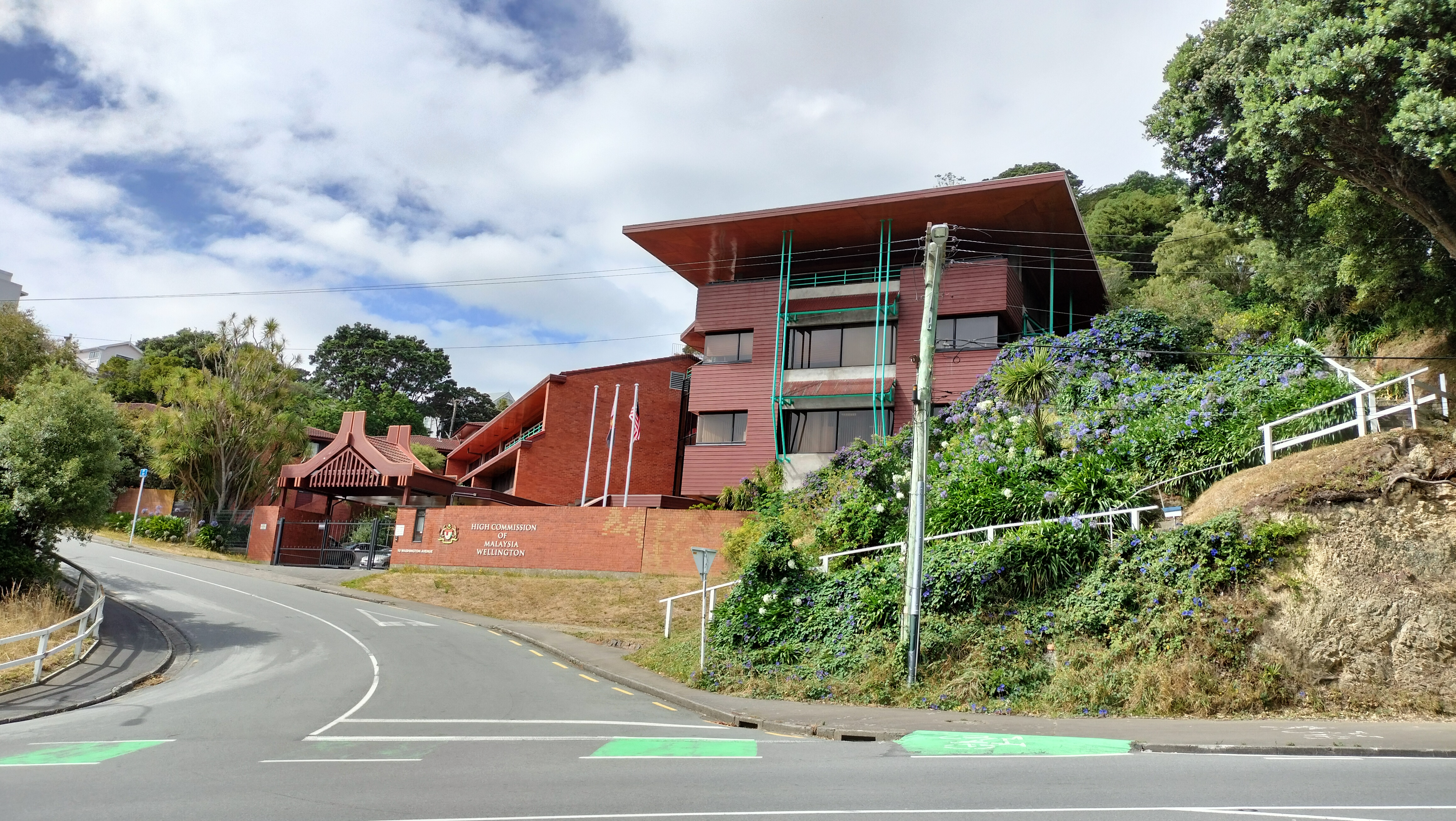
High Commission of Malaysia: 10 Washington Avenue, Brooklyn, Wellington

== Notable buildings and sites ==
=== Architectural styles ===
Brooklyn features a number of different styles of buildings, although very few of the older cottage style remain. One of the oldest recorded in the general area stands in Nairn Street in the neighbouring suburb of Mount Cook. It dates from 1858, and hosts The Colonial Cottage Museum. Brooklyn itself contains examples of many building styles including:

- Villa (Simple villas) - from c. 1895
- Bay villa - from c. 1910
- California bungalow - from c. 1920
- State Housing - between 1930 and 1940
- Bungalow - from c. 1960

==== Villa (Simple villas) ====
The Simple Villa, a style of home built from around 1895, often appears in the form of structures larger than the cottages and Victorian style properties built prior to this time. They generally consisted of a hallway with two rooms off each side and an indoor bathroom at the end. Often a "lean-to" attached to the back of the house would allow for a storage area that might include a wash-house. With the design of the property having the chimney within the house (as opposed to attached to an exterior side wall) fireplaces in the sitting room and kitchen could both use the same chimney — a configuration known as "back-to-back". Brooklynites built these homes from timber — with most of the period features (including architraves, skirting-boards, doors and windows) purchasable as standard items from timber merchants.

=== Buildings of special interest ===
- The Sutch House, designed by Ernst Plischke and built between 1953 and 1956, stands on Todman Street. The house shows influences of the Austrian Neues Bauen (New Construction) movement to which Plischke had belonged in the 1930s. Wellington architect Alistair Luke restored the Sutch House during 2003 and the restoration project later received the 2004 New Zealand Institute of Architects Resene Award for Enduring Architecture.
- Tower Studio (located on Karepa Street), a purpose-built five-level Tuscan tower, takes its inspiration from the towers of San Gimignano in Tuscany. It overlooks the native bush reserve in Brooklyn with an open belvedere offering 360° views.
- Brick houses in Tanera Crescent: in 1903, Ashton B. Fitchett built a brickworks in Tanera Crescent. The brickyard chimney was demolished in 1926. Some of the houses and a number of walls in that area are built with bricks from the Brooklyn Brickworks.
- The Cornerstore is the wedge-shaped building on the corner of the intersection of Ohiro Road and Todman Street. It was probably built (along with other buildings in the nearby area) by William and Frederick Ferkins in around 1903 and sold to George Goldstein for £750. The ground floor was later divided into shops which from 1909 onwards included a bootmaker, fishmongers, butchers and confectioners. In 1988, Lois Daish converted the shops into the Brooklyn Café and Grill which became a popular local restaurant. Several other restaurants followed in the same building after Lois Daish sold the Brooklyn Café.
- The Old Post Office at 22 Cleveland Street was the Brooklyn Post Office for 75 years. Parkin Brothers won the contract to build the new Post Office which opened some time before May 1914. (Up until then, the post office formed part of the general store run by Mrs Ferkins on the corner of Ohiro Road and Cleveland Street.) The mailroom and telephone exchange were on the ground floor and the top storey formed living quarters for the postmaster. There were two doors opening onto Cleveland Street as one allowed access to the private mailboxes while the other led to the public area and service counter. Along with many other small post offices, the Brooklyn Post Office closed in 1989 when the New Zealand Post Office became a state owned enterprise, and it was then turned into a private residence.
- Central Park Hospital on Ohiro Rd (originally called the Benevolent Home, and later the Ohiro Home) was established in 1892 on land that had been part of the Town Belt. In the 1930s, it came under the administration of the Wellington Hospital Board. It closed in 1977 and was demolished in 1977.

=== House prices ===
Between 2017 and 2021 the median house sale price in Brooklyn increased from $690,000 to $1.1 million. As of 2021, the median rental in Brooklyn is $685.

== Facilities and amenities ==
=== Cinema ===
Brooklyn hosts the Penthouse Cinema, located on Ohiro Road just south of Cleveland Street. Constructed for the Ranish family in the art deco style, it opened on 15 June 1939 as the Vogue Theatre. The Ranish family ran the cinema until 1951, when the Vogue Company Limited took over. The Vogue Company turned the cinema into a television studio where TV commercials were shot. The building was renamed the Penthouse Cinema when it was bought by Merv and Carol Kisby in 1975. Since then additional screens have been added, as well as refurbishment of the interior in keeping with its original style.

=== Library ===
Brooklyn has a branch library, opened on 16 February 1905 at 22 Harrison Street as the second branch library of the main Central Library. It opened with 350 books and for 9 hours per week; the Librarian lived in a flat at the rear of the building. In 1960 the library moved to the present building on the corner of Harrison and Cleveland Streets. The original entrance was in Harrison Street, but in 1992 this was closed and ramp access provided in Cleveland Street, enabling pushchairs to enter easily. The original building is now the Brooklyn Playcentre.

=== Fire station ===
The Brooklyn Fire Station on Cleveland Street was opened by Sir Māui Pōmare on 10 July 1928. This replaced the earlier fire service which operated with a handcart and pump, and later a horse and cart, in a building where the Scout Hall now stands on Harrison Street.

=== Sporting facilities ===
The Wellington Renouf Tennis Centre on Brooklyn Rd, near Central Park, is named after Frank Renouf, a Wellington businessman and keen supporter and follower of tennis.

=== Playgrounds ===
Playgrounds include the Central Park play area, the Harrison Street play area and the Mitchell Street play area.

=== Brooklyn Community Centre ===
The Brooklyn Community Centre is owned, managed and maintained by the Brooklyn Community Association which marked its 75th anniversary in 2022.

=== Churches ===
- Wellington Korean Church: 184 Ohiro Road, Brooklyn, Wellington (Wellington Christ's Letter Church At the Korean Presbyterian Church of Jesus in Daeyangju (Gosin Overseas)). This was formerly Brooklyn Baptist Church, which opened on 10 July 1910, with morning and evening services preached by Rev. A. Dewdney. It closed for Baptist services in April 2002.
- Reformed Church of Wellington: 36 Harrison Street, Brooklyn, Wellington (evangelical in approach, and reformed in theology)
- Anglican/Two Todman: 2 Todman Street, Brooklyn, Wellington - Two Todman is run by the Brooklyn Anglicans. Its four spaces include a Co-Working Office, Community Space, Chapel and Op-Shop.
- CLOSED - St Matthew's Anglican/Joint Parish (St Matthew's combined Anglican, Methodist and Presbyterian groups in the 1970s), 96 Washington Avenue, Brooklyn, Wellington. The site was sold by the Anglican church and has been developed into a multi unit residential development.
- CLOSED - St Bernard's Church (Catholic), 37 Taft Street, Brooklyn, Wellington closed in 2021 in the face of a shrinking congregation and the costs of maintenance and repairs.

=== Malaysian High Commission ===
The Malaysian High Commission occupies the corner of Washington Avenue and Brooklyn Road.

== Transportation ==
Brooklyn is served by routes 7, 17 and 29 on the Metlink network. On a number of occasions, buses have become stuck on the narrow corners of Brooklyn roads. In 2023, a bus was halted on a narrow street until local residents moved their parked cars.

In 2021, a trial bike/scooter lane was installed on the uphill section of Brooklyn hill from Nairn Street to Ohiro Road.

== Education ==
=== Brooklyn School ===
Brooklyn School is a co-educational state school (primary through to intermediate) for Year 1 to 8 students (6 to 12 year olds), with a roll of 373 as of July 2026.

The first school in the area opened in Vogeltown on 3 September 1883. In 1898, the School Board bought some land in Brooklyn between Washington Avenue and Harrison Street and the school building was moved to that site. The school opened in October 1898. The head teacher was Mr John Hopkirk and Miss Jessie Fitchett was the infant mistress. More classrooms were added over the following years. A new Infant Block was opened on 14 August 1930. Miss Jessie Fitchett retired in 1929 and Mr John Hopkirk retired in 1931.

=== St Bernard's School ===
St Bernard's School was a co-educational state-integrated Catholic primary school for Year 1 to 8 students.

The school started in 1935 when the Sisters of Mercy provided two sisters, Boniface and Fabian. It opened on 5 February of that year as St Anthony's School Brooklyn, in the church on Jefferson Street - the church itself opened in June 1911. At the time the school opened 44 Catholic children attended the local state school, 43 of whom transferred to St Anthony's on opening day. By the end of the year the roll had risen to 69.

The building remained as one large church hall, installing a temporary partition during the week to create a second classroom. On Fridays after school had finished the partition and desks were removed and replaced with pews for the Mass on Sunday, after which the desks and partition were put back ready for school on Monday morning.

In 1949 the then Parish Priest Father Paul Kane procured land at the present site on Taft Street. The parish re-located the church and had a new school built. However, in 1961 the parish and the school changed their name: the Priest who enacted this bore the name "Bernard". The Sisters of Mercy continued to run the school until 1973 when Doreen Barry became the first lay Principal.

On the 17th of December 2025, St Bernard's School was closed.

=== Early childhood education services ===
Local early childhood education providers include Brooklyn Playcentre, Brooklyn Kindergarten and Brooklyn Kids Early Childhood Education.

== Notable people ==
- James Cowan (1870–1943), historian and journalist
- Pat Lawlor (1893–1979), journalist, novelist, poet, historian
- Ernst Plischke (1903–1992), architect
- Jane Thomson (1858–1944), mountaineer
- Shihad (once called Pacifier), band
- Bill Sutch (1907–1975), teacher, economist, writer and diplomat
- Nancy Adams (1926–2007), botanist and botanical artist
- Marilyn Duckworth (1935-), writer
- Raymond Ching (1939-), painter
- Anthony Ford, lawyer (1942–2020), lawyer
- Edward James "Teddy" Roberts, All Black rugby player (1913–21) and Wellington representative cricketer (1909–10).
