= Ōwhiro Bay =

Suburb of Wellington City, New Zealand

- Suburb
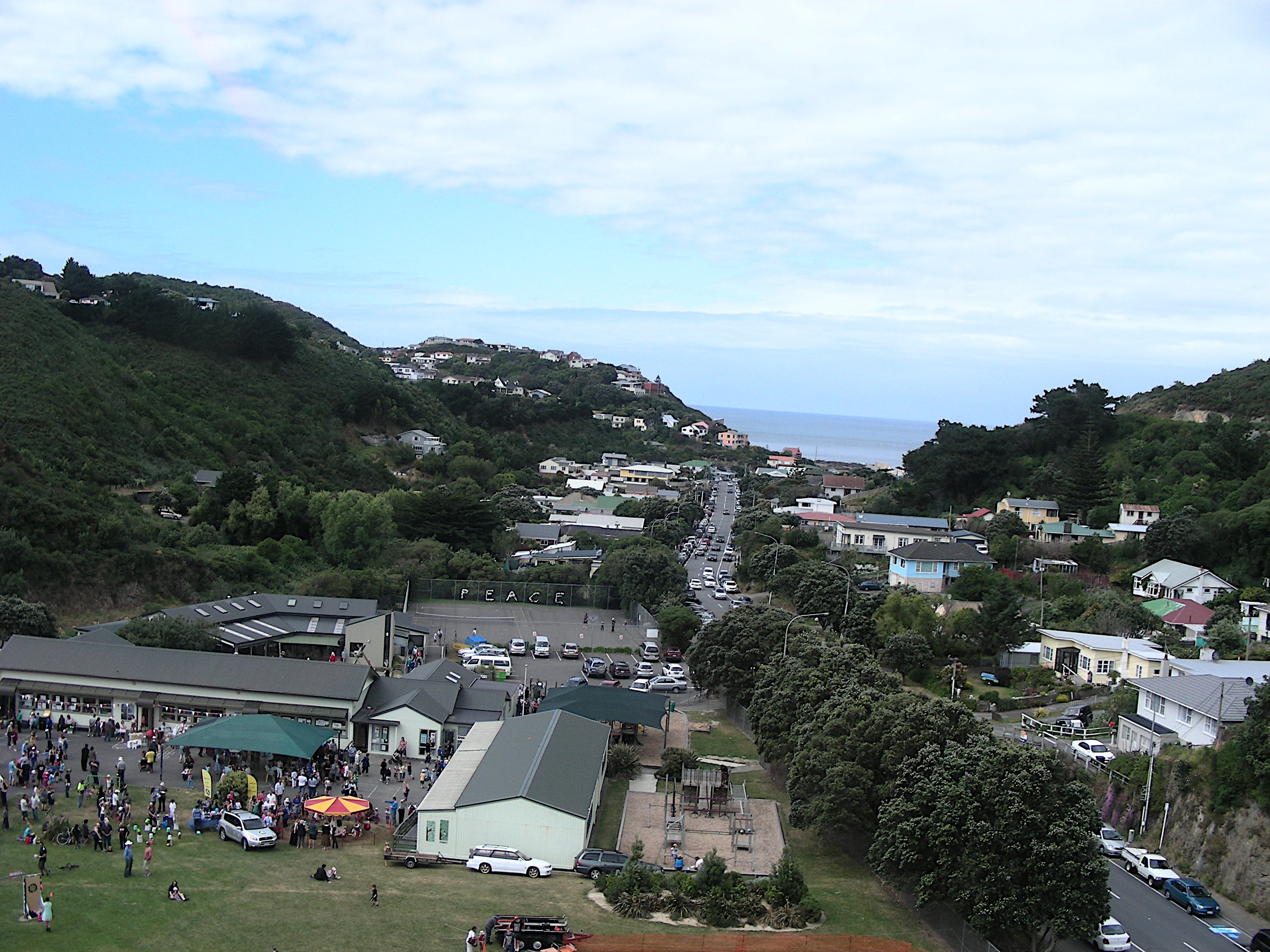
- Interactive map of Ōwhiro Bay
- Coordinates: 41°20′38″S 174°45′32″E
- Country: New Zealand
- City: Wellington City
- Local authority: Wellington City Council
- Electoral ward: Paekawakawa/Southern Ward; Te Whanganui-a-Tara Māori Ward

Area
  - Land: 406 ha (1,000 acres)

Population (June 2025)
  - Total: 2,020
  - Density: 498/km^{2} (1,290/sq mi)

	Brooklyn	Kingston
Mākara	Ōwhiro Bay	Island Bay
	Cook Strait

Ōwhiro Bay is a southern suburb of Wellington, New Zealand, that overlooks Cook Strait. It is situated west of the larger suburb of Island Bay. The official name of the suburb was changed from Owhiro Bay to Ōwhiro Bay (with macron) by the New Zealand Geographic Board on 21 June 2019. The Bay and stream are named after the navigator Whiro, who landed the waka Nukutere there, and has been historically settled by the Kāti Māmoe, Ngāti Ira and Ngāi Tara tribes.

The suburb has been an industrial area of southern Wellington since the 1950s with the opening of Bata Shoes and the Southern Landfill (1976).

== History ==
Ōwhiro Bay has been the site of several shipwrecks. In October 1903, the medium-sized timber barquentine La Bella was run aground, although it was floated off a few weeks later. The Yung Pen, a Taiwanese squid boat, foundered in 1982.

== Demographics ==
Ōwhiro Bay statistical area covers 4.06 km^{2} (1.57 sq mi). It had an estimated population of 2,020 as of June 2025, with a population density of 498 people per km^{2}.

Historical population
Year	Pop.	±% p.a.
2006	1,824	—
2013	1,893	+0.53%
2018	1,998	+1.09%
2023	1,995	−0.03%

Ōwhiro Bay had a population of 1,995 in the 2023 New Zealand census, a decrease of 3 people (−0.2%) since the 2018 census, and an increase of 102 people (5.4%) since the 2013 census. There were 999 males, 981 females, and 18 people of other genders in 705 dwellings. 5.9% of people identified as LGBTIQ+. The median age was 39.4 years (compared with 38.1 years nationally). There were 315 people (15.8%) aged under 15 years, 399 (20.0%) aged 15 to 29, 1,047 (52.5%) aged 30 to 64, and 237 (11.9%) aged 65 or older.

People could identify as more than one ethnicity. The results were 75.0% European (Pākehā); 13.4% Māori; 8.0% Pasifika; 16.5% Asian; 3.0% Middle Eastern, Latin American and African New Zealanders (MELAA); and 2.4% other, which includes people giving their ethnicity as "New Zealander". English was spoken by 96.5%, Māori by 3.6%, Samoan by 3.8%, and other languages by 20.3%. No language could be spoken by 1.8% (e.g. too young to talk). New Zealand Sign Language was known by 0.5%. The percentage of people born overseas was 29.5, compared with 28.8% nationally.

Religious affiliations were 28.3% Christian, 3.6% Hindu, 0.5% Islam, 0.3% Māori religious beliefs, 2.7% Buddhist, 0.6% New Age, 0.2% Jewish, and 1.4% other religions. People who answered that they had no religion were 56.5%, and 5.9% of people did not answer the census question.

Of those at least 15 years old, 690 (41.1%) people had a bachelor's or higher degree, 723 (43.0%) had a post-high school certificate or diploma, and 270 (16.1%) people exclusively held high school qualifications. The median income was $57,100, compared with $41,500 nationally. 378 people (22.5%) earned over $100,000 compared to 12.1% nationally. The employment status of those at least 15 was 1,038 (61.8%) full-time, 204 (12.1%) part-time, and 45 (2.7%) unemployed.

== Education ==
Ōwhiro Bay School is a coeducational state contributing primary (years 1–6) school. It has a roll of 90 students as of October 2025. It opened in 1930.

== Notable features ==
=== Oku Street Reserve ===
Oku Street Reserve is a park situated on a promontory between Island Bay and Ōwhiro Bay. Views over Ōwhiro Bay can be obtained from the reserve.
