= Vogeltown, Wellington =

Suburb of Wellington City, New Zealand

Coordinates: 41.313°S 174.769°E

Vogeltown
- Suburb
- Interactive map of Vogeltown
- Country: New Zealand
- City: Wellington City
- Electoral ward: Paekawakawa/Southern Ward

Area
  - Land: 28 ha (69 acres)

Population (2023 census)
  - Total: 1,020
  - Density: 3,600/km^{2} (9,400/sq mi)

Brooklyn	Mount Cook
Kowhai Park	Vogeltown	Newtown
Mornington	Berhampore

Vogeltown is a hillside suburb of Wellington, New Zealand, on the eastern slopes of Brooklyn and overlooking Newtown. It is sometimes considered part of Mornington.

In later Māori times parts of the area now occupied by Vogeltown and eastern Brooklyn were used for cultivation by the Te Aro hapu (sub-tribe) of the Te Atiawa, the dominant tribe in the region. In European times the area became known as the Omaroro cultivation area, and control and ownership remained with Te Aro. The area primarily used for cultivation were located north of Pearce Street on what is now part of Wellington's Town Belt and this area is a protected site under the Town Belt Management Plan and the Wellington District Plan.

There is no record of alienation of the land from the original owners until 25 March 1859, when the Te Aro people led by Mohi Ngaponga leased the section to one John H E Wright for 14 years at £30 per annum. At the end of this lease in 1873 Wright purchased the freehold for £700. This land has since developed into the suburb of Vogeltown.

At the council review of suburb boundaries in the early 21st century, Vogeltown nearly suffered absorption into adjacent suburbs.

The name Vogeltown derives from Sir Julius Vogel, author, entrepreneur, and premier of New Zealand from April 1873 until July 1875. In 1867, Vogel married Mary Clayton, daughter of architect Sir William Clayton, who gifted the couple Finnimore House. This house is still located at the corner of Finnimore Terrace and Dransfield Road, past the top of Hutchison Road in Vogeltown. The estate has been subdivided several times.

Many of the houses built in Vogeltown date from the 1920s.

== Demographics ==
Vogeltown covers 0.28 km^{2} (0.11 sq mi). It is part of the Kingston-Mornington-Vogeltown statistical area.

Historical population
Year	Pop.	±% p.a.
2006	834	—
2013	927	+1.52%
2018	990	+1.32%
2023	1,020	+0.60%

Vogeltown had a population of 1,020 in the 2023 New Zealand census, an increase of 30 people (3.0%) since the 2018 census, and an increase of 93 people (10.0%) since the 2013 census. There were 498 males, 507 females, and 12 people of other genders in 390 dwellings. 12.4% of people identified as LGBTIQ+. There were 138 people (13.5%) aged under 15 years, 264 (25.9%) aged 15 to 29, 528 (51.8%) aged 30 to 64, and 93 (9.1%) aged 65 or older.

People could identify as more than one ethnicity. The results were 87.1% European (Pākehā); 6.2% Māori; 3.5% Pasifika; 9.4% Asian; 2.9% Middle Eastern, Latin American and African New Zealanders (MELAA); and 3.2% other, which includes people giving their ethnicity as "New Zealander". English was spoken by 98.2%, Māori by 1.8%, Samoan by 0.9%, and other languages by 16.5%. No language could be spoken by 1.2% (e.g. too young to talk). New Zealand Sign Language was known by 1.5%. The percentage of people born overseas was 30.6, compared with 28.8% nationally.

Religious affiliations were 18.5% Christian, 1.2% Hindu, 0.3% Islam, 0.6% Buddhist, 0.3% New Age, 0.3% Jewish, and 2.6% other religions. People who answered that they had no religion were 70.3%, and 5.3% of people did not answer the census question.

Of those at least 15 years old, 471 (53.4%) people had a bachelor's or higher degree, 324 (36.7%) had a post-high school certificate or diploma, and 93 (10.5%) people exclusively held high school qualifications. 216 people (24.5%) earned over $100,000 compared to 12.1% nationally. The employment status of those at least 15 was 588 (66.7%) full-time, 111 (12.6%) part-time, and 30 (3.4%) unemployed.
