= Berhampore, New Zealand =

Suburb in Wellington City, New Zealand

Berhampore
- Suburb
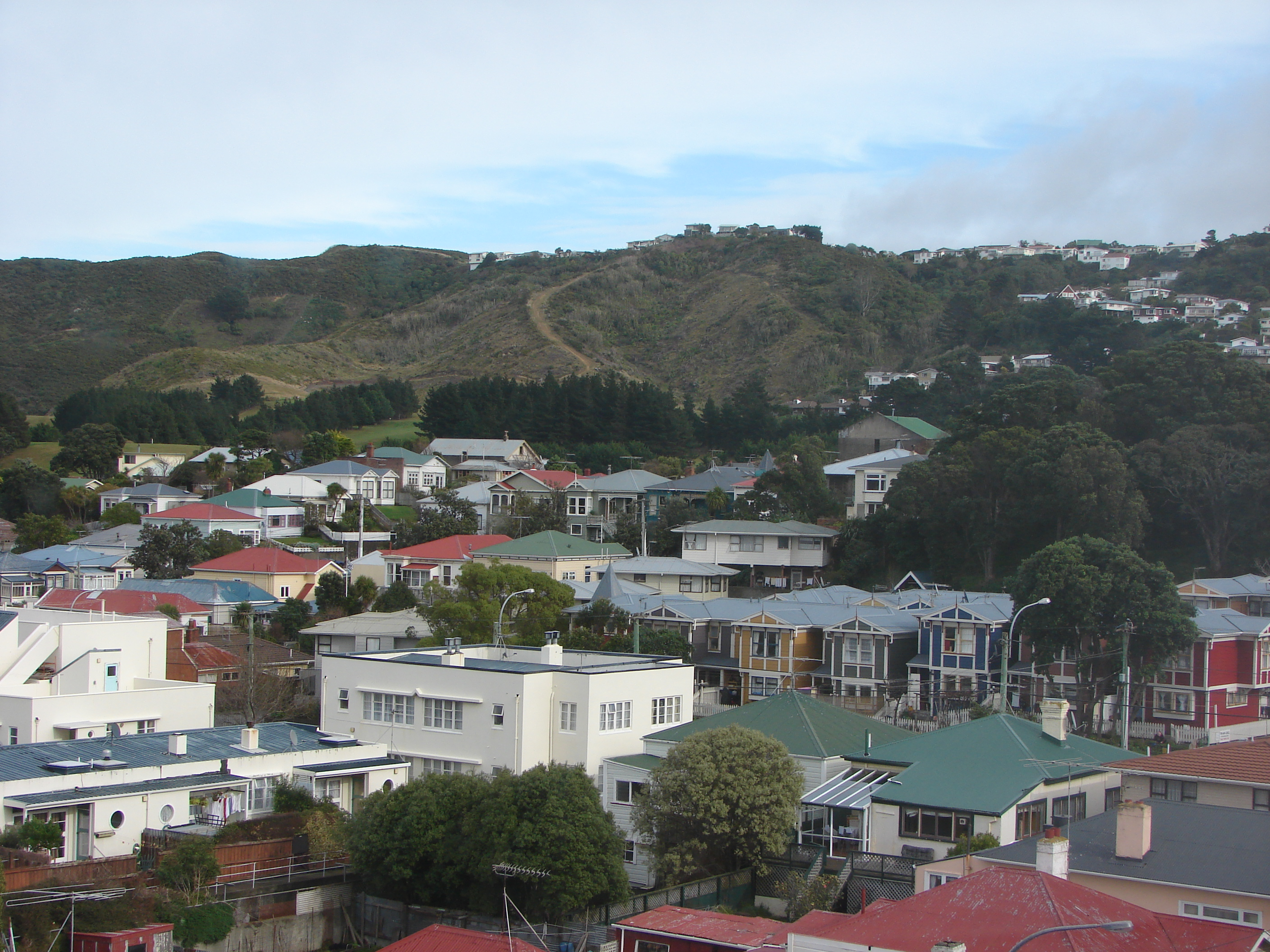
- View over Berhampore
- Interactive map of Berhampore
- Coordinates: 41.321°S 174.775°E
- Country: New Zealand
- City: Wellington City
- Local authority: Wellington City Council
- Electoral ward: Paekawakawa/Southern Ward; Te Whanganui-a-Tara Māori Ward

Area
  - Land: 140 ha (350 acres)

Population (June 2025)
  - Total: 3,730
  - Density: 2,700/km^{2} (6,900/sq mi)

Mornington	Vogeltown	Newtown
Kingston	Berhampore	Melrose
Happy Valley	Island Bay	Southgate

Berhampore (/ˈbɛərəmpɔːr/) is a suburb of Wellington, New Zealand. It lies towards the south of the city, four kilometres from the city centre, and two kilometres from the coast of Cook Strait. It is surrounded by the suburbs of Vogeltown, Newtown, Melrose, Island Bay, Kingston, and Mornington. The suburb takes its name from George Hunter's property, Berhampore Farm, which was named after Berhampore in Bengal, where Hunter's father-in-law had served. Also surrounding Berhampore is the Berhampore Golf Course as well as a very extensive green belt (known as the town belt) with many walkways and tracks connecting outlying areas. The suburb also boasts some of Wellington's best all weather sports fields, on Adelaide Road and the national hockey stadium. Alongside the golf course there is a skateboard/bmx park, right by a kids mountain bike track. Berhampore School opened in 1915.

Residents of Berhampore are both ethnically and socio-economically diverse and contribute to the atmosphere of their surrounding communities. Recent traffic calming by Wellington City Council in Adelaide Road and Luxford Street has helped create a more defined sense of community in Berhampore.

The housing stock in Berhampore is a mix of mostly lower to middle value properties, with examples of most building styles and types seen in New Zealand since European settlement. The Berhampore State Flats, located on Adelaide Road, are a fine example of the international style of architecture. They were designed by F. Gordon Wilson, chief architect at the Department of Housing Construction, and completed in 1938–1939.

== Demographics ==
Berhampore statistical area covers 1.40 km^{2} (0.54 sq mi). It had an estimated population of 3,730 as of June 2025, with a population density of 2,664 people per km^{2}.

Historical population
Year	Pop.	±% p.a.
2006	3,597	—
2013	3,609	+0.05%
2018	3,870	+1.41%
2023	3,693	−0.93%

Berhampore had a population of 3,693 in the 2023 New Zealand census, a decrease of 177 people (−4.6%) since the 2018 census, and an increase of 84 people (2.3%) since the 2013 census. There were 1,689 males, 1,941 females, and 63 people of other genders in 1,554 dwellings. 10.4% of people identified as LGBTIQ+. The median age was 36.4 years (compared with 38.1 years nationally). There were 513 people (13.9%) aged under 15 years, 843 (22.8%) aged 15 to 29, 1,746 (47.3%) aged 30 to 64, and 588 (15.9%) aged 65 or older.

People could identify as more than one ethnicity. The results were 69.9% European (Pākehā); 10.2% Māori; 8.3% Pasifika; 17.3% Asian; 6.7% Middle Eastern, Latin American and African New Zealanders (MELAA); and 1.6% other, which includes people giving their ethnicity as "New Zealander". English was spoken by 94.9%, Māori by 3.5%, Samoan by 3.2%, and other languages by 22.7%. No language could be spoken by 2.4% (e.g. too young to talk). New Zealand Sign Language was known by 0.6%. The percentage of people born overseas was 34.6, compared with 28.8% nationally.

Religious affiliations were 26.9% Christian, 3.3% Hindu, 3.9% Islam, 0.6% Māori religious beliefs, 1.3% Buddhist, 0.8% New Age, 0.5% Jewish, and 1.9% other religions. People who answered that they had no religion were 56.7%, and 4.2% of people did not answer the census question.

Of those at least 15 years old, 1,449 (45.6%) people had a bachelor's or higher degree, 1,137 (35.8%) had a post-high school certificate or diploma, and 597 (18.8%) people exclusively held high school qualifications. The median income was $47,600, compared with $41,500 nationally. 564 people (17.7%) earned over $100,000 compared to 12.1% nationally. The employment status of those at least 15 was 1,725 (54.2%) full-time, 405 (12.7%) part-time, and 93 (2.9%) unemployed.
