= Tip shop =

Shop selling used goods

The Denmark Tip Shop in Denmark, Western Australia, 2026

A tip shop is a type of shop which primarily sells goods and materials which have been diverted from going to landfill, or have been donated from the public. Tip shops are usually run as not-for-profit enterprises, and in many cases, are operated by local councils or community organisations. Tip shops are also known as recycle shops, reuse shops, or dump shops. These kinds of shops are found in Australia, New Zealand, and the United Kingdom.

The motives for operating a tip shop relate mainly to the diversion of useful products and materials from being buried in landfill, and instead sold back to the community, facilitating a circular economy. In some instances, the proceeds from these shops are donated to charity. Tip shops could be described as a kind of variety store, with many types of products such as furniture, toys, books, and appliances in these shops. They appeal particularly to bargain hunters, and those looking for DIY opportunities.

Some tip shops are staffed by volunteers, whereas others have paid employees. Some are also run as a hobby by the operator.

== See also ==
- Upcycling
- Recycling in Australia
