= Newtown, New Zealand =

Suburb of Wellington City, New Zealand

Newtown
- Suburb
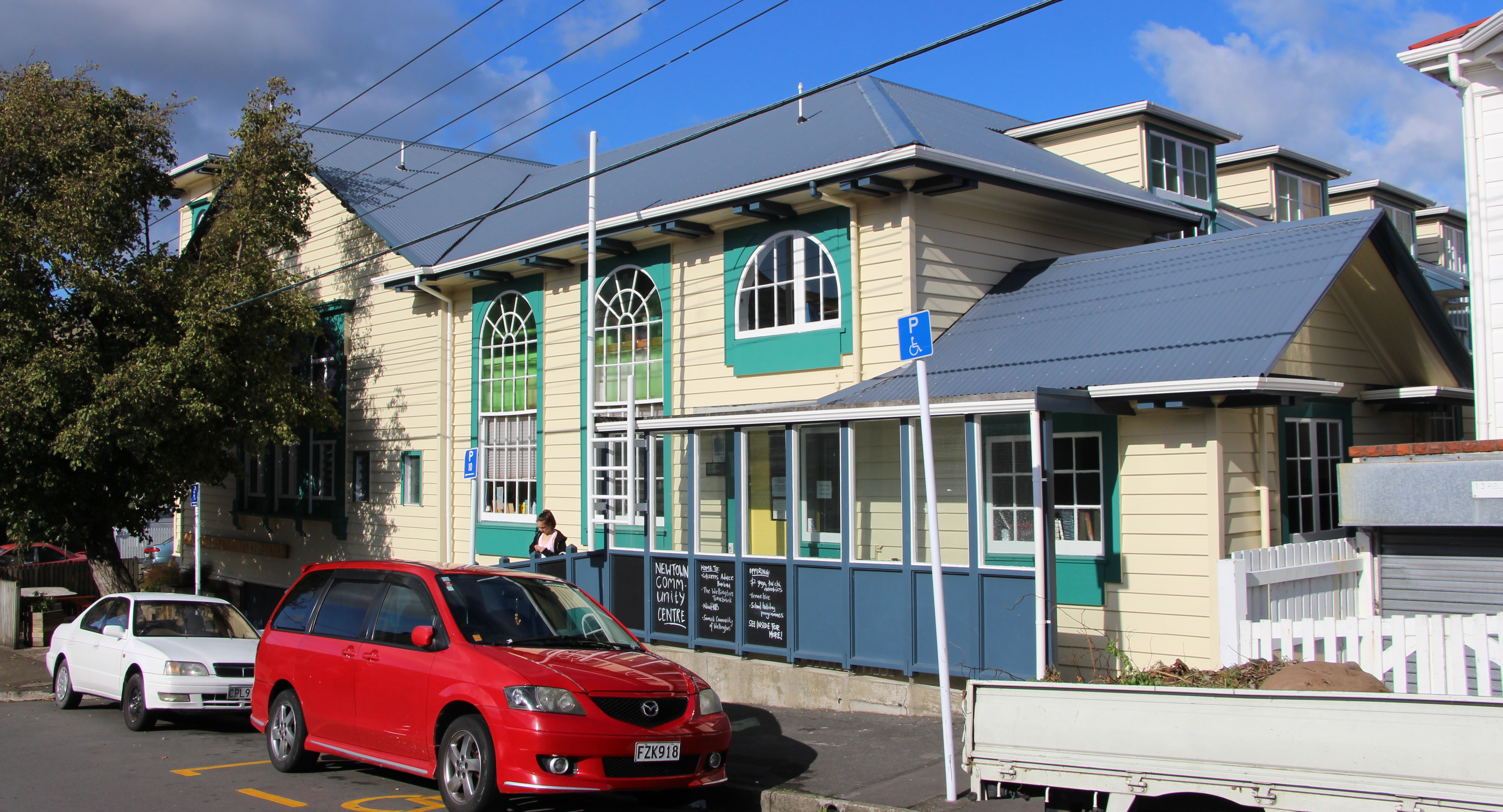
- Newtown Community Centre
- Interactive map of Newtown
- Coordinates: 41°18′49″S 174°46′47″E
- Country: New Zealand
- City: Wellington City
- Local authority: Wellington City Council
- Electoral ward: Paekawakawa/Southern Ward; Te Whanganui-a-Tara Māori Ward

Area
  - Land: 256 ha (630 acres)

Population (June 2025)
  - Total: 9,620
  - Density: 3,760/km^{2} (9,730/sq mi)
- Hospitals: Wellington Hospital

	Mount Cook	Hataitai
Vogeltown	Newtown	Evans Bay
	Berhampore	Kilbirnie, Melrose

The suburb of Newtown lies in the southern part of Wellington in New Zealand. It lies east of Vogeltown, between Mount Cook and Berhampore. The main thoroughfares of Newtown are Riddiford St, leading from Mount Cook to Berhampore and Melrose, and Constable St, leading from Newtown to Kilbirnie.

== History ==
In 1879 the tram services were established in Newtown, this resulted in the growth of the population and significant residential development in the 1890s, with the population being largely working-class.

Newtown was originally a working-class suburb, but has followed gentrification trends in recent years, attracting large numbers of immigrants, students and young professionals and resulting in an ethnically diverse population. The Wellington City Council District Plan identifies Newtown as a suburb with an "identifiable or distinct character".

On 16 May 2023, a fire broke out at the 92-bed Loafers Lodge in Newtown. Five people died, 20 were injured, and many of the 99 people known to be living at the hostel were made homeless.

Laura Rosier (1927-1994) moved to Newtown with her family as a baby and lived there for her entire life. In the 1980s and early 1990s, she devoted herself to researching and compiling Newtown's history. Her book, New Town Will Grow, references a remark attributed to Charles Moody, who built the Newtown Hotel at the corner of Constable and Riddiford Streets in 1876. He is said to have expressed hope that a new town would develop around the hotel.

== Demographics ==
Newtown, comprising the statistical areas of Newtown North, Newtown West and Newtown South, covers 2.56 km^{2} (0.99 sq mi). It had an estimated population of 9,620 as of June 2025, with a population density of 3,758 people per km^{2}.

Historical population
Year	Pop.	±% p.a.
2006	7,881	—
2013	8,400	+0.92%
2018	9,183	+1.80%
2023	9,126	−0.12%

Newtown had a population of 9,126 in the 2023 New Zealand census, a decrease of 57 people (−0.6%) since the 2018 census, and an increase of 726 people (8.6%) since the 2013 census. There were 4,239 males, 4,647 females, and 240 people of other genders in 3,420 dwellings. 15.4% of people identified as LGBTIQ+. The median age was 31.8 years (compared with 38.1 years nationally). There were 984 people (10.8%) aged under 15 years, 3,189 (34.9%) aged 15 to 29, 3,969 (43.5%) aged 30 to 64, and 984 (10.8%) aged 65 or older.

People could identify as more than one ethnicity. The results were 64.7% European (Pākehā); 11.6% Māori; 8.4% Pasifika; 20.7% Asian; 7.5% Middle Eastern, Latin American and African New Zealanders (MELAA); and 2.1% other, which includes people giving their ethnicity as "New Zealander". English was spoken by 95.1%, Māori by 3.6%, Samoan by 3.7%, and other languages by 25.2%. No language could be spoken by 1.7% (e.g. too young to talk). New Zealand Sign Language was known by 0.6%. The percentage of people born overseas was 37.2, compared with 28.8% nationally.

Religious affiliations were 27.3% Christian, 3.1% Hindu, 4.3% Islam, 0.4% Māori religious beliefs, 1.2% Buddhist, 1.0% New Age, 0.4% Jewish, and 2.0% other religions. People who answered that they had no religion were 55.4%, and 5.2% of people did not answer the census question.

Of those at least 15 years old, 3,741 (45.9%) people had a bachelor's or higher degree, 2,955 (36.3%) had a post-high school certificate or diploma, and 1,443 (17.7%) people exclusively held high school qualifications. The median income was $43,500, compared with $41,500 nationally. 1,134 people (13.9%) earned over $100,000 compared to 12.1% nationally. The employment status of those at least 15 was 4,617 (56.7%) full-time, 1,182 (14.5%) part-time, and 336 (4.1%) unemployed.

Individual statistical areas
Name	Area (km^{2})	Population	Density (per km^{2})	Dwellings	Median age	Median income
Newtown North	0.70	2,166	3,094	693	32.9 years	$43,500
Newtown West	0.66	3,372	5,109	1,284	29.1 years	$44,700
Newtown South	1.20	3,588	2,990	1,443	33.7 years	$42,100
New Zealand					38.1 years	$41,500

== Features ==
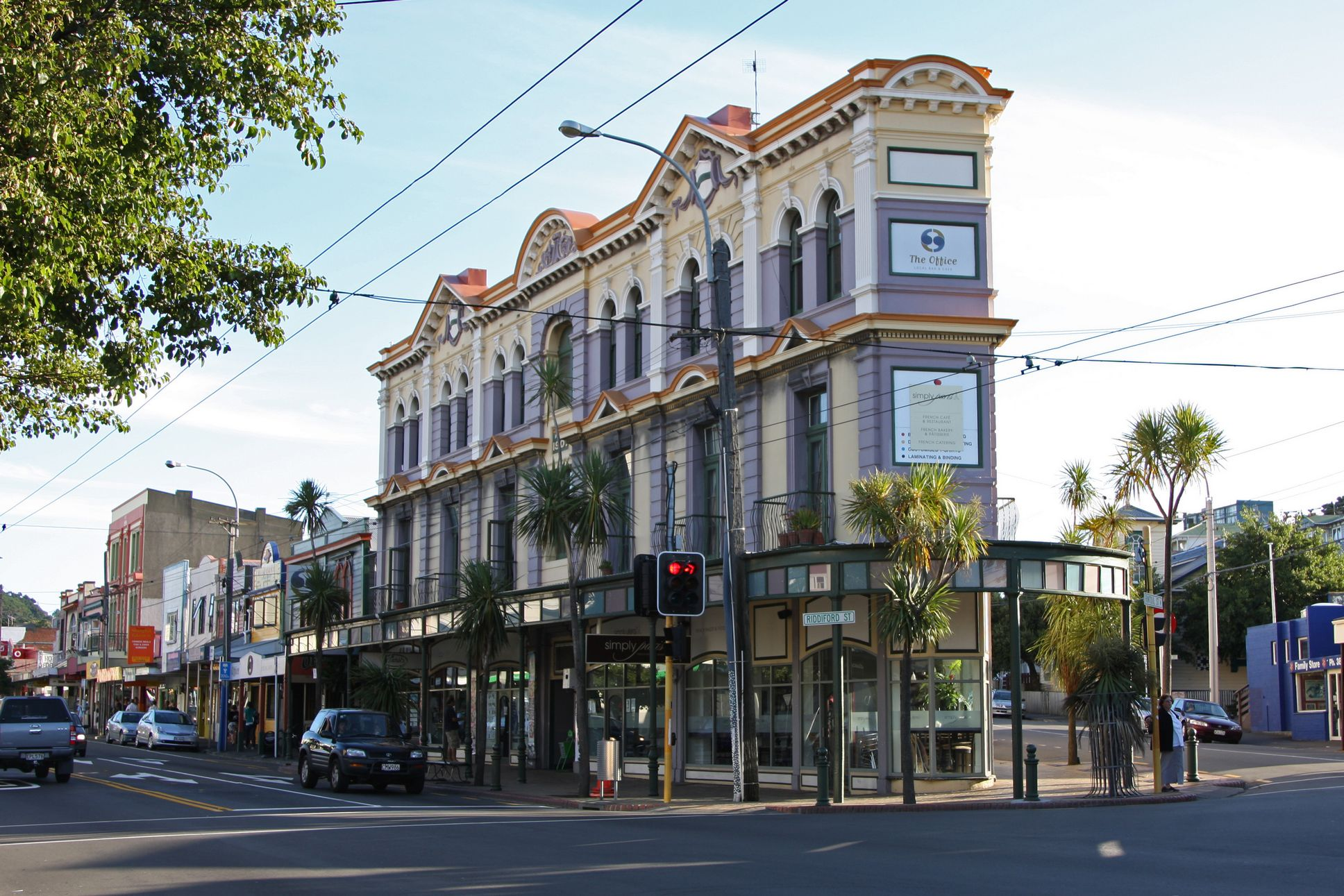
The former Langham Private Hotel

Government House on Rugby Street, Wellington Hospital located on Riddiford Street and Wellington Zoo all lie within the boundaries of Newtown. Newtown Park is located next to the Zoo, off Roy Street and provides a venue for athletics and football. The Park consists of a 400m all-weather running track, grandstand, changing rooms, community rooms and play area. Wellington City Council has spent $3.6 million on modernising facilities at Newtown Park to meet current and future needs for the athletics and soccer sports codes, and the wider community.

== Newtown Festival ==
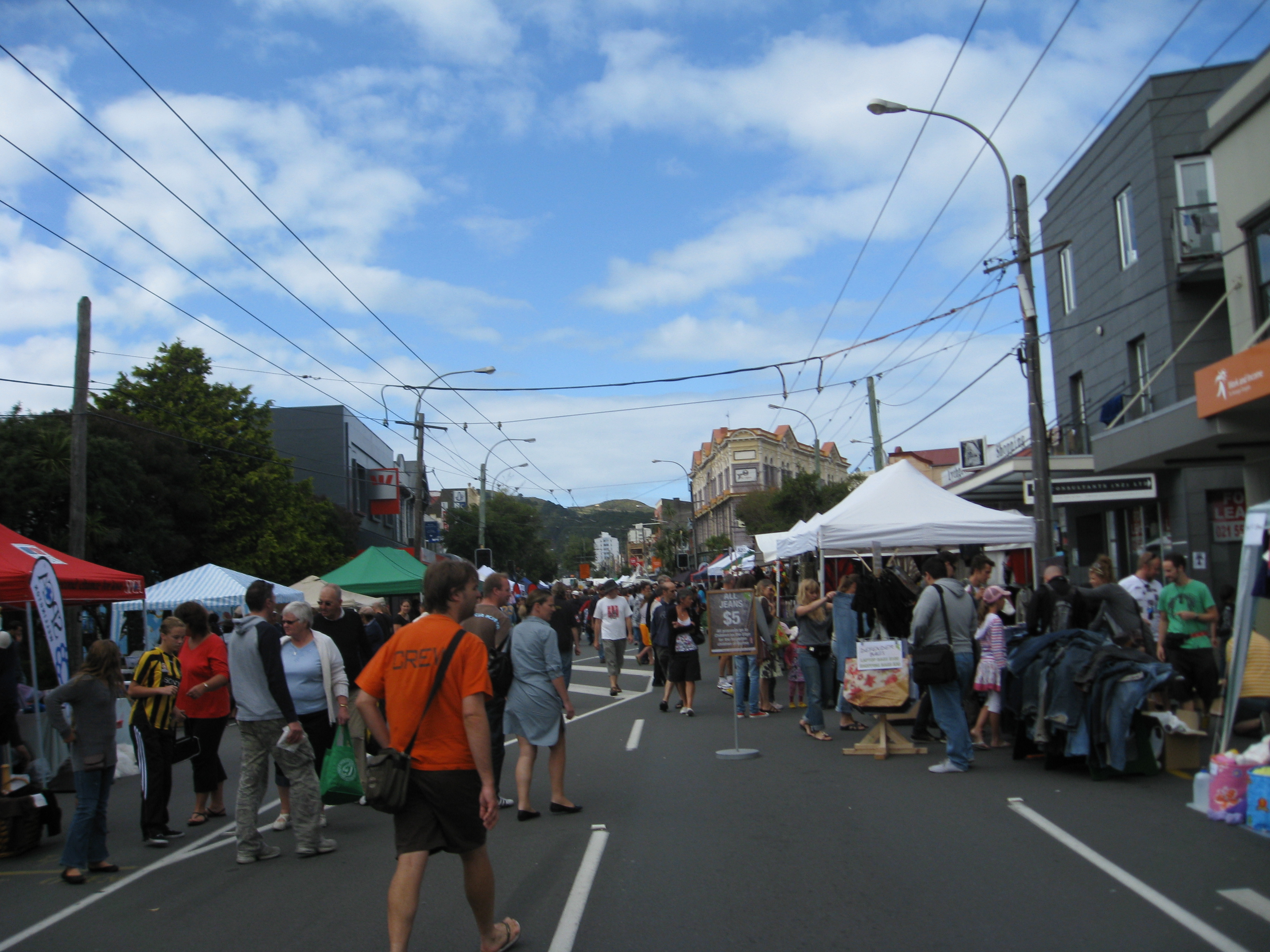
The Newtown Festival in 2010 (looking up Riddiford Street)

The annual Newtown Festival takes place over one day, culminating in the Newtown Festival Street Fair which is usually held on International Children's Day (usually the first Sunday in March). The event grew from small beginnings in 1995 with the opening of a neighbourhood park. It is now New Zealand's biggest free musical festival and street fair, with 16 outdoor stages, more than 1000 performers and crowds of 80,000 a year. Up until 2017 the festival was run by the Newtown Residents’ Association, and in 2017 a charitable trust, the Newtown Festival Trust, was established to support the organising team. Eleven blocks of Newtown's central Riddiford Street and eleven adjoining side streets are all closed to vehicles for the festival.

== Education ==
=== Newtown School ===
Newtown School is a co-educational contributing state primary school for Year 1 to 6 students, with a roll of 315 as of July 2026. It opened in 1879.

The school has a Māori language immersion class, Ngāti Kotahitanga, providing an 80 per cent immersion environment. It also has an indoor heated swimming pool, computer suite, and separate junior and senior playgrounds.

=== South Wellington Intermediate School ===
South Wellington Intermediate School, also known as 'SWIS', is a co-educational state intermediate school for Year 7 to 8 students, with a roll of 371. It opened in 1946.

=== St Anne's School ===
St Anne's School is a co-educational state-integrated Catholic primary school for Year 1 to 8 students, with a roll of 220 as of July 2026. It opened about 1897, replacing an earlier school which had opened in 1893. Marist Newtown amalgamated with St Anne's in 1984.
