= Oku Street Reserve =

Park in Wellington, New Zealand

Coordinates: 41°20′44″S 174°45′52″E

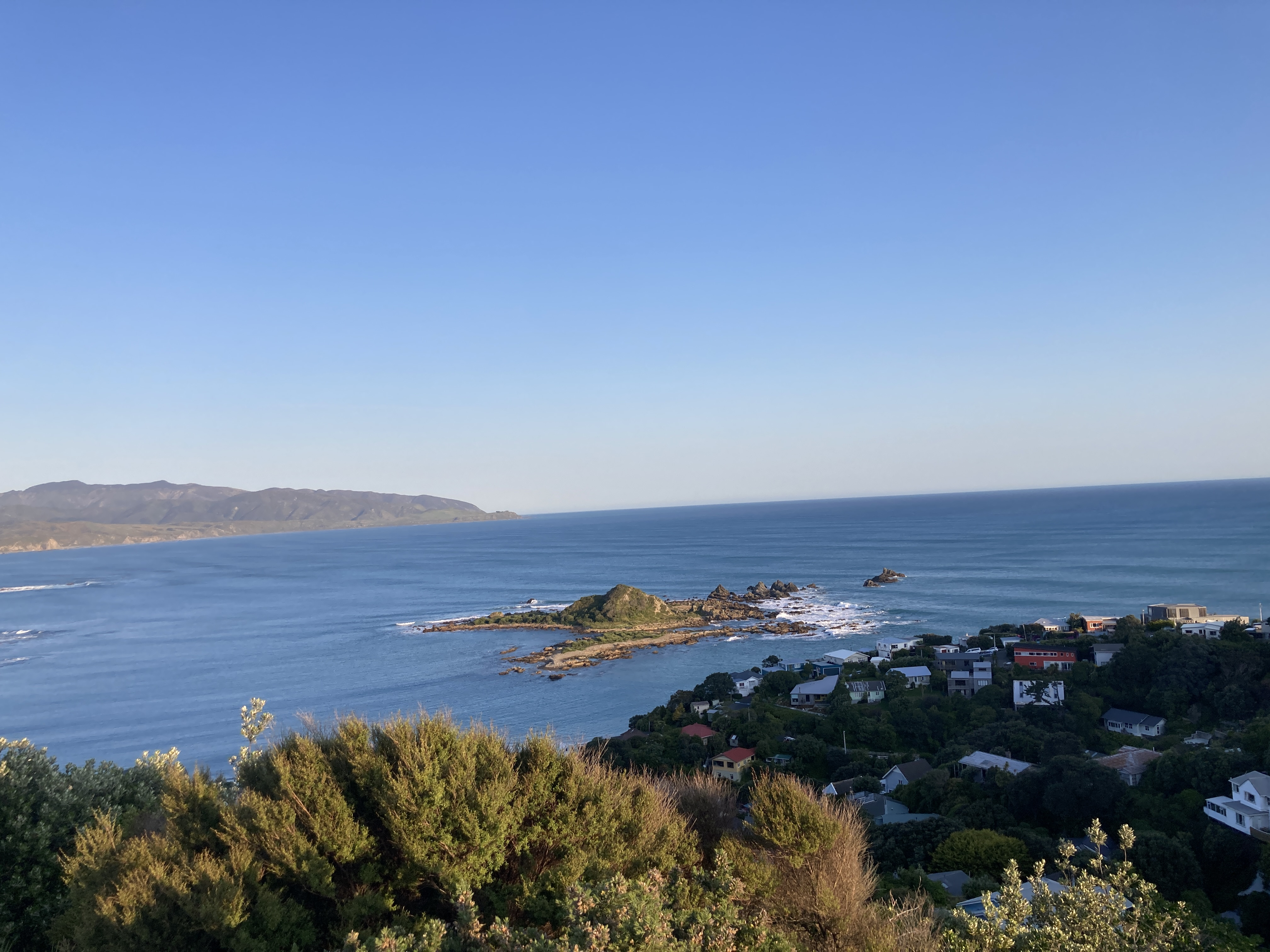
The Oku Street Reserve view of Taputeranga Island

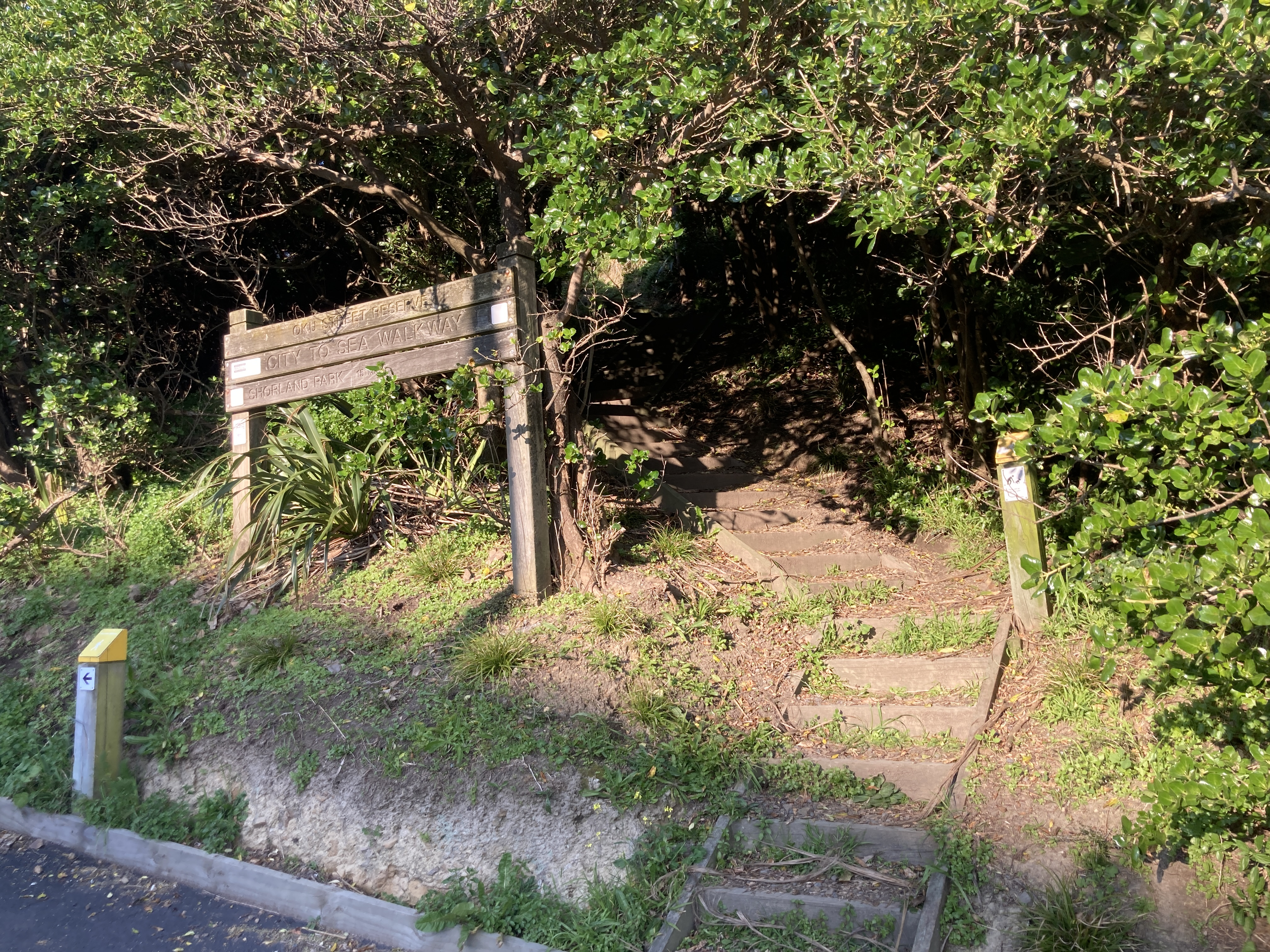
The entrance to the Oku Street Reserve

The Oku Street Reserve is an 8-hectare park in Wellington, New Zealand. It is located on a promontory between the suburbs of Island Bay and Ōwhiro Bay, and looks down over Taputeranga Marine Reserve and Ōwhiro Bay. It comprises two small hills with a ridge between them, and has a path and several benches, with two public access points.

In the 1970s the land that is now the reserve was farm pasture. In the late 1980s Fletcher Construction planned a new subdivision on the site, but after local opposition they did a land-swap with Wellington City Council who bought the land and gazetted it as a recreation reserve in 1998. Volunteers replanted the reserve with seedlings from the Council's nursery.

== Access ==
Wellington's City to Sea Walkway passes along Oku Street in Island Bay and traverses the reserve before continuing down Severn Street in Ōwhiro Bay. The park has a path in the middle with some offshoots, and has stairs on either side. It is not wheelchair accessible.

== Biology and ecology ==
Oku Street Reserve contains several species of endemic flora, such as taupata, koromiko, and tarata. It also is home to a few relict specimens of Cook Strait mahōe, which only grows on either side of the Cook Strait.
