= Island Bay =

Suburb of Wellington City, New Zealand

- Suburb
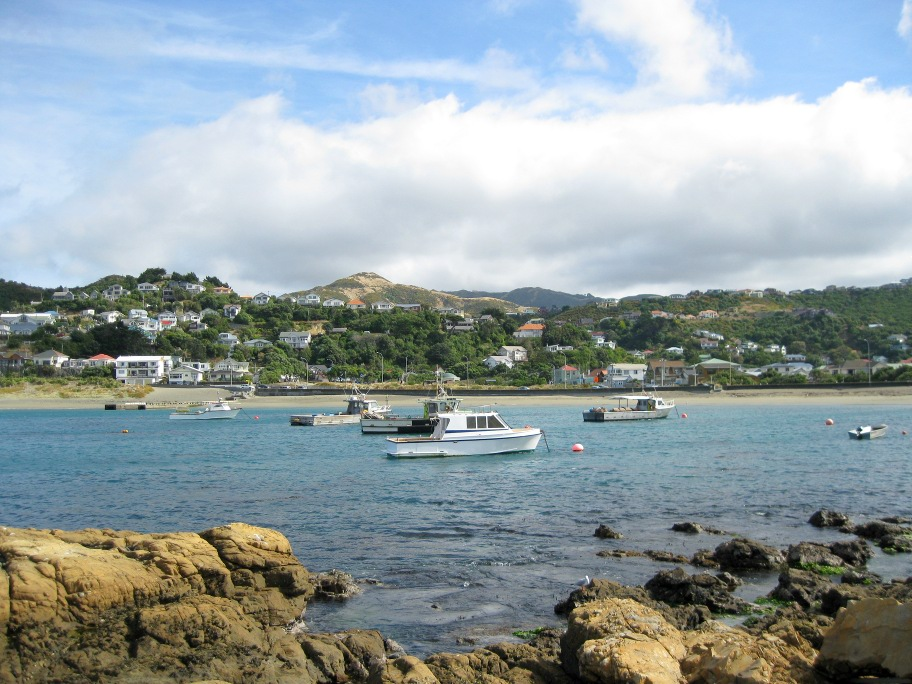
- Interactive map of Island Bay
- Coordinates: 41°20′16″S 174°46′20″E
- Country: New Zealand
- City: Wellington
- Local authority: Wellington City Council
- Electoral ward: Paekawakawa/Southern Ward; Te Whanganui-a-Tara Māori Ward
- Established: 1879

Area
  - Land: 215 ha (530 acres)

Population (June 2025)
  - Total: 6,950
  - Density: 3,230/km^{2} (8,370/sq mi)

Mornington	Berhampore	Melrose
Kingston	Island Bay	Southgate
Ōwhiro Bay	Cook Strait	Houghton Bay

Island Bay is a coastal suburb of Wellington, the capital of New Zealand, situated 5 km (3.1 mi) south of the city centre.

Island Bay lies on the bay which shares its name, one of numerous small bays off Cook Strait and west of Lyall Bay. 500m offshore in Island Bay lies Tapu Te Ranga Island, which forms a natural breakwater and provides a sheltered anchorage for local fishing boats.

A noted current Island Bay resident is mayor of Wellington Andrew Little. Former residents include former Mayor Celia Wade-Brown, the late Bruce Stewart, writer and dramatist at Tapu Te Ranga Marae; Middlesbrough F.C. and All Whites striker Chris Killen; artist John Drawbridge; poet Alan Brunton; writer Robin Hyde; and, in the late 19th century, The Hermit of Island Bay.

== History ==
=== Māori history ===
In Māori mythology, Tapu te Ranga Island is said to be Patawa, a point from which the legendary Māori chief Kupe sighted the giant octopus Te Wheke-a-Muturangi, which he pursued across Cook Strait. In pre-European times, Island Bay was home to several pā, including Te Mupunga Kāinga, today represented with a pou in Shorland Park. A succession of iwi occupied Island Bay, including Ngāi Tara and Ngāti Ira.

A famous battle which took place on the beach of Island Bay was well documented by Elsdon Best. A raiding taua (war party) from Muau-poko were making their way to the Ngai Tara stronghold of Te Whetu-Kairangi, a fortified pa on what is now Miramar peninsula (but was then an island). In the morning, Ngāi Tara warriors came down from Uruhau fort (modern day Southgate) and engaged Muau-poko in battle on the beach. Two Muau-poko chiefs were killed, and later cremated in Haewai (Houghton Bay). This battle is commemorated with a pou on the zig-zag leading from Liffey Street to Orchy Crescent.

During a battle in which Ngāti Mutunga drove Ngāti Ira from Wellington in 1827, Tamairangi, the wife of the Ngāti Ira chief, is said to have sought refuge on Tapu te Ranga Island with her children, fleeing by canoe when Tapu te Ranga Island was besieged. In Treaty of Waitangi settlements, both Te Atiawa and Ngati Toa have claimed tangata whenua status over Tapu te Ranga Island. The case of Ngāti Toa case was proven in the Māori Land Court.

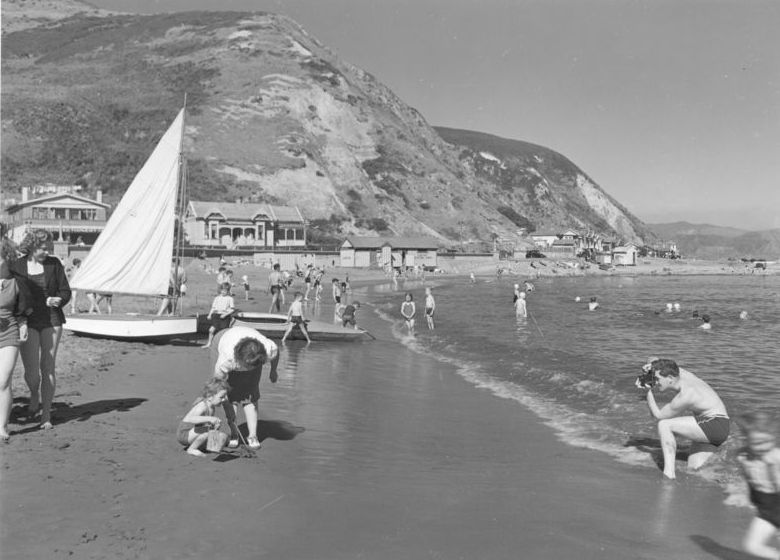
Island Bay beach, date unknown

=== Later development ===
In the early days of European settlement George Hunter was the chief proprietor of the Island Bay Estate, where he bred stock on his stud farm. The Island Bay portion was subdivided and auctioned in March 1879. Many streets in Island Bay are named after British and European rivers.

In the late 19th century, Island Bay was settled by Italian fishermen. More waves of Italian immigrants arrived in New Zealand in the early 20th century, including a group of about 50 Italians from Massa Lubrense and Stromboli, mostly involved in fishing, who settled at Eastbourne. From the 1920s a number of these fishermen moved to Island Bay, where there was already an Italian presence from the nineteenth century migrations. The 'Blessing of the Boats', a ceremony with Italian origins, has been held at Island Bay since 1933. A small number of Shetlander fishermen also settled at island Bay, sharing their techniques for fishing the rough waters of Cook Strait with the Italians.

In 1883 a racecourse opened at Island Bay. The course was approximately 2km long with two long straights joined by large curves. It and ran down what are now Clyde and Derwent Streets, bounded by Medway and Humber Streets and encompassing parts of Mersey Street and Thames Street. The last race meeting was held in 1890. The land was used as a training ground in the Boer War then divided up and sold to developers in 1903.

In 1905, Wellington's tramline was extended to Island Bay, increasing the area's popularity, and steadily transforming it into a seaside suburb. Many Island Bay houses and shops date from the 1920s, a period of rapid development for the area.

Our Lady's Home of Compassion opened in Island Bay in 1907 after fundraising by Suzanne Aubert, a Catholic nun who established a group called Daughters of Our Lady of Compassion. The very large and imposing building was located on a hillside overlooking the valley of Island Bay. Originally, the home cared for children and babies, with a school "for the education of waifs" and a hospital for "incurable cases". From the 1920s the Home of Compassion expanded its services to include general nursing and surgical services for the poor. The original building was demolished in 1987 and replaced by a new complex on the same site.

In 1909 an assembly hall was opened at Humber Street. It later became a theatre, and in 1931 after alterations was opened as the Catholic Church of the Holy Name of Jesus. The church was badly damaged in the 1942 Wairarapa earthquake and after that was used for storage and other purposes. As of 2025 it is still standing.

== Notable features ==
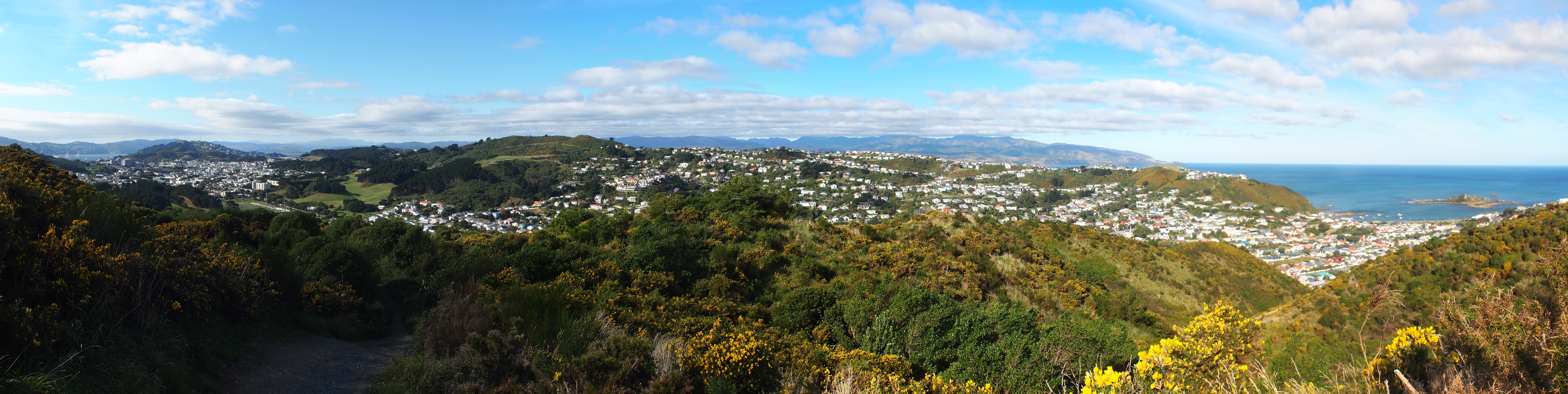
Panorama of City To Sea Walkway, showing Island Bay on the right

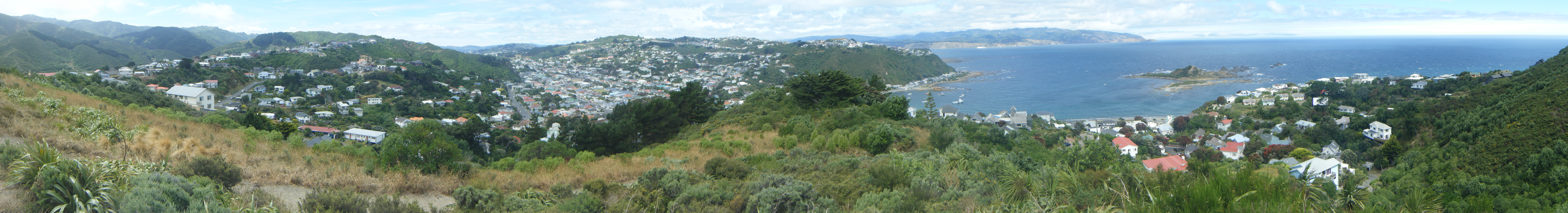
Panorama of view across most of residential Island Bay

=== Erskine College and Chapel ===
Designed by John Sydney Swan and built in 1904–1906, the Convent of the Sacred Heart, a Catholic girls' boarding school, was renamed Erskine College in the late 1960s after the former Superior General Mother Janet Erskine Stuart. The adjacent Erskine Chapel of the Sacred Heart, also designed by John Sydney Swan, was built in 1930 in the French Gothic style. Erskine Chapel is considered to have one of the finest chapel interiors in New Zealand, and is listed as Category I by Heritage New Zealand. The school closed in 1985 and the complex is privately owned. Erskine College was used as a location in Peter Jackson's 1996 film The Frighteners. The chapel was refurbished in 2003, and is a popular venue for weddings and concerts.

=== Island Bay Marine Education Centre ===
The Island Bay Marine Education Centre is located on the rocks just above high tide on the foreshore of Island Bay beach. The centre has a small aquarium and touch tank, and is open to the public on Sundays. It is housed in a former bait shed built in 1950. Until 1996, the building was used by local fishermen to store bait and equipment, and was a gathering place for the local fishing community. In 1996 marine biologist Victor Anderlini and his partner Judy Hutt established the Marine Education Centre in the building.

=== Churches ===
There are five churches in Island Bay, with facilities that are used by a range of community groups. The oldest is St Hilda's Anglican church, designed by architect Frederick de Jersey Clere and built in 1911. It had a traditional brick front design and some stained glass windows honouring early settlers, but the parish was required by Wellington City Council to address the building's vulnerability to earthquakes. The upgrade project saw the removal of all the brickwork which was replaced by a timber frame, with floor to ceiling glass facing The Parade. The strengthened building re-opened on 27 November 2022. The church is named after St Hilda of Whitby, possibly because the early settlers felt the coastline resembled Northumbria.

The Baptist, Catholic, Serbian Orthodox and Presbyterian churches were built more recently. St Francis de Sales Catholic church is located at 173 Clyde Street. The current church was built in 1965.

St Sava Orthodox Church is one of only two Serbian Orthodox churches in New Zealand. Serbians who arrived in New Zealand after World War 2 visited Greek and Russian Orthodox churches, but wanted to establish their own church. They bought the former St Francis de Sales Catholic church at 75 The Parade in 1968. The first mass was held on 14 September 1969, and the church was consecrated in 1970 by a visiting Serbian archbishop.

=== Scuba diving and snorkeling ===
Two diving companies operate in Island Bay, and offer trips within the local Taputeranga Marine Reserve and to the wreck of HMNZS Wellington, a decommissioned Royal New Zealand Navy frigate which was sunk off the coast of Island Bay in November 2005 to create an artificial reef.

A snorkel trail is located on the eastern side of the bay and offers opportunities to see local fish and marine life.

=== Shorland Park ===
Shorland Park is a small public park at Island Bay Beach. The playground was extensively upgraded in 2021 and 2022, reopening on 4 March 2022.

Shorland Park contains a band rotunda built in 1930. Plaques record the 152 local soldiers who died in World War I and World War II, and the loss of American submarines and their crew in the Pacific. In the 1930s, local brass bands and the Salvation Army frequently played in the rotunda. The rotunda is now used for occasional concerts, notably during the annual Island Bay Festival.

=== Tapu Te Ranga Marae ===
Situated in 50 acres (20 ha) of replanted native forest on a hill near Rhine Street, Tapu Te Ranga Marae was a living marae and the home of Bruce Stewart. The 2,500 m^{2} (27,000 sq ft) wooden house extended over ten levels, and was built with recycled materials.

The marae was built by Stewart over a few years between 1977 and 1983. At 12:30am on 9 June 2019, the marae suffered a devastating fire and was subsequently destroyed. There are plans to rebuild the marae in the same site.

=== Taputeranga Marine Reserve ===
The waters surrounding Island Bay have been under the protection of the Department of Conservation since the creation of the 854 hectare Taputeranga Marine Reserve in 2006. The reserve is home to kelp forests, octopuses, blue cod and banded wrasse. Dolphins and whales also frequent the area. A 200m 'snorkel trail' within the reserve starts and finishes in Island Bay.

=== Tapu Te Ranga Motu (the Island) ===
Tapu Te Ranga Motu, the island in the middle of the bay, once served as a refuge for local Māori. Tamairanga, the wife of the Ngati Ira chief Whanake, escaped to the island with her children during a battle that forced the tribe from Wellington Harbour.

=== Victoria University Coastal Ecology Laboratory ===
Victoria University of Wellington maintains the Victoria University Coastal Ecology Laboratory, an active research and teaching presence on Wellington's south coast. The laboratory overlooks the spectacular exposed rocky reef systems typical of Cook Strait.

=== Walkways ===
Island Bay is the starting point for two recreational walkways that cross the city. The City to Sea Walkway runs 12 km (7.5 mi) between Parliament and Island Bay through the Botanic Gardens and Aro Valley. The 11 km (6.8 mi) Southern Walkway follows the Town Belt between Island Bay and Oriental Bay.

Oku Street Reserve is an 8-hectare park on a promontory between Island Bay and Ōwhiro Bay which looks down over Taputeranga Marine Reserve and Ōwhiro Bay. It comprises two small hills with a ridge between them. The City to Sea Walkway passes from Oku Street, through the reserve and then down Severn Street.

=== Cycle way ===
In 2016, a controversial 1.7 km-long cycle way was built along The Parade. The cycleway project was criticised by many Wellingtonians, for its $1.5 million cost, the narrowing of a major thoroughfare along a major bus route, the removal of curb-side car parks, 'ghost markings' (old road markings that had been painted over but were still visible), and the design, which in some sections placed the cycleway between the footpath and parked cars. At least one pedestrian was badly injured in a collision with a cyclist on the cycle way. Then-Mayor Celia Wade-Brown admitted in June 2016 that the council had handled the project badly. In September 2017, following additional consultation with the public, Wellington City Council put forward recommendations to fix the many problems identified with the new cycleway. Remediation discussions continued for more than four years at a cost of over $1 million. In the eight years after the cycle way was built, cycling accidents increased six-fold. In 2022 more car parks were removed to create better sight lines, and islands were built to protect cyclists: after these changes were made fewer accidents occurred.

== Island Bay Festival ==
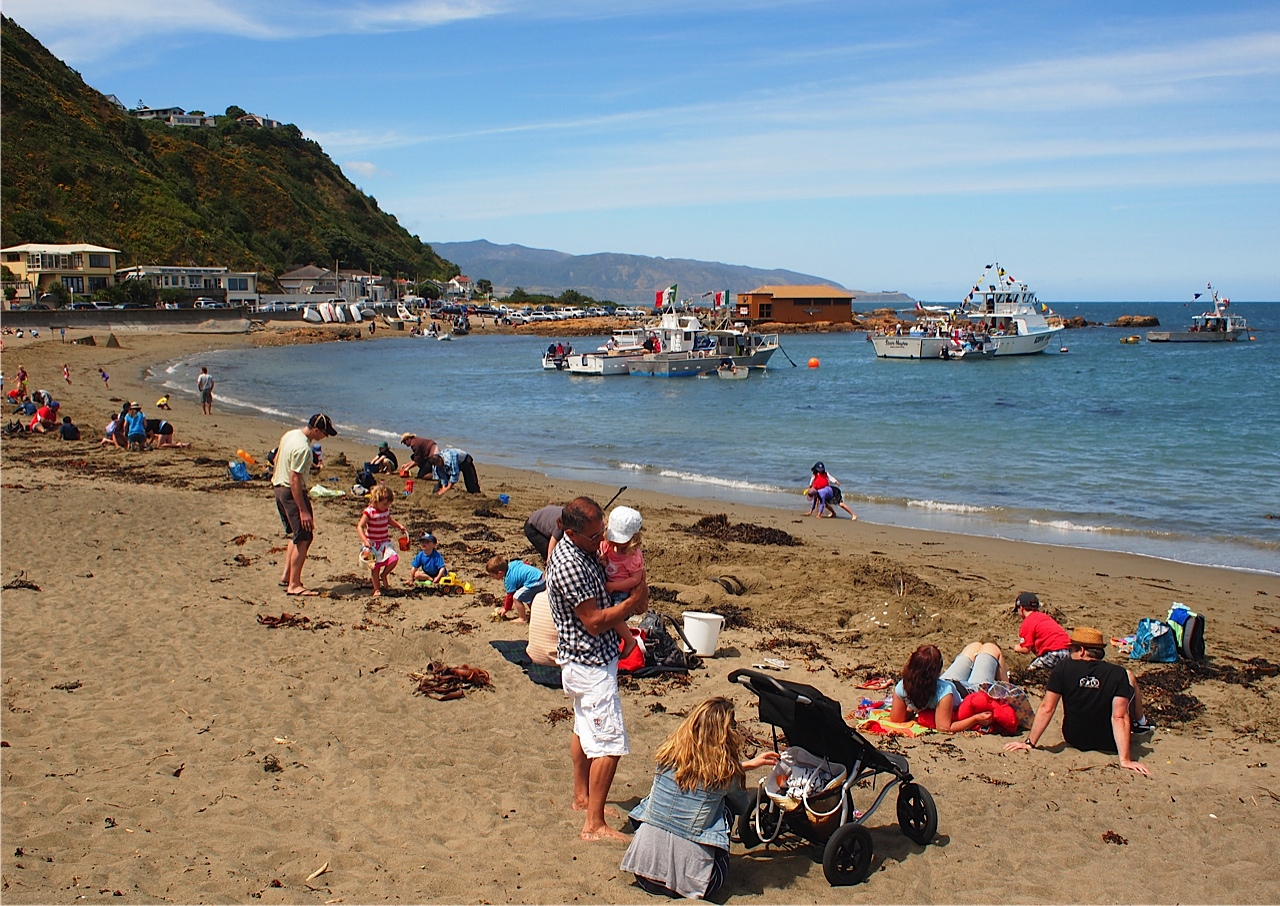
Blessing of the Boats ceremony during the 2012 Island Bay Festival

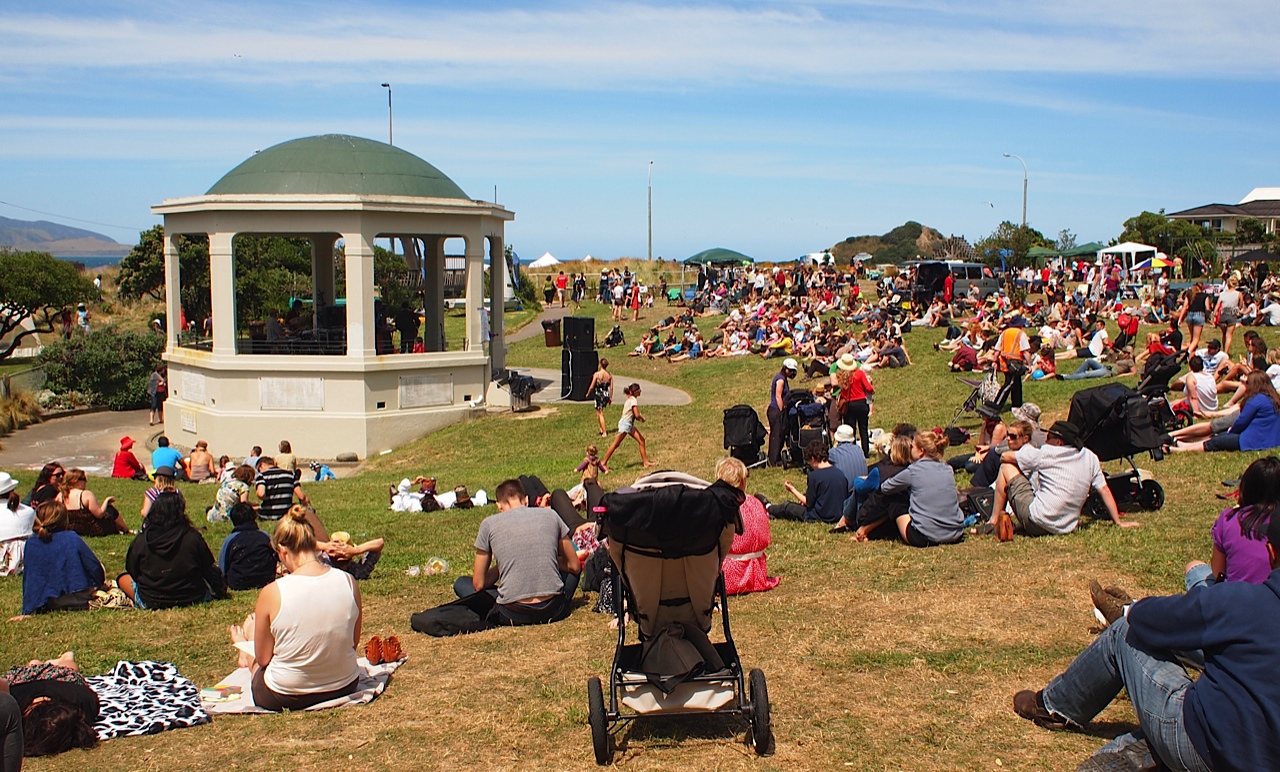
Shorland Park band rotunda during the 2012 Island Bay Festival

The annual Island Bay Festival takes place over eight days each February. It has included:

- The Blessing of the Boats. The Blessing of the Boats is a southern Italian tradition where boats are decorated with flags and blessed by a priest to protect the crew from the sea and to bring good fortune. The ceremony has taken place in Island Bay since 1933, when the fishing boat Santina foundered in Cook Strait, with the loss of four crew including three Italians. On 13 February 2011, during that year's Island Bay Festival, a chair was unveiled for the crew of the Santina, presented by friends and family of the four casualties.
- The Ribble Street Races: A Soapbox derby down the steep Ribble Street attracted budding race car drivers with junior, intermediate, senior and expert categories, the latter often reaching 65 km/h.
- The Island Bay Raft Race: The inaugural raft race was in 2020, with DIY rafts and family teams paddling parallel to the beach. The Lyall Bay Surf club provided support and rescue services on the day.
- The swim to and from the Island: Participants were ferried by boat to the Island, and swam the few hundred metres back to shore. A 'there and back' race was also held.
- The Festival Parade: This proceeds down The Parade to Shorland Park. In the past the Parade featured a colourful 'dressing of the bicycles' competition.
- The Teddy Bears Picnic: On the final Sunday of the festival, younger members of the community brought their teddy bears for a picnic in Shorland Park.

== Demographics ==
Island Bay, comprising the statistical areas of Island Bay West and Island Bay East, covers 2.15 km^{2} (0.83 sq mi). It had an estimated population of 6,950 as of June 2025, with a population density of 3,233 people per km^{2}.

Historical population
Year	Pop.	±% p.a.
2006	6,402	—
2013	6,606	+0.45%
2018	6,900	+0.87%
2023	6,828	−0.21%

Island Bay had a population of 6,828 in the 2023 New Zealand census, a decrease of 72 people (−1.0%) since the 2018 census, and an increase of 222 people (3.4%) since the 2013 census. There were 3,246 males, 3,516 females, and 69 people of other genders in 2,526 dwellings. 7.4% of people identified as LGBTIQ+. The median age was 38.7 years (compared with 38.1 years nationally). There were 1,137 people (16.7%) aged under 15 years, 1,449 (21.2%) aged 15 to 29, 3,429 (50.2%) aged 30 to 64, and 816 (12.0%) aged 65 or older.

People could identify as more than one ethnicity. The results were 84.0% European (Pākehā); 10.1% Māori; 5.2% Pasifika; 11.1% Asian; 2.6% Middle Eastern, Latin American and African New Zealanders (MELAA); and 2.1% other, which includes people giving their ethnicity as "New Zealander". English was spoken by 97.3%, Māori by 2.8%, Samoan by 1.3%, and other languages by 17.8%. No language could be spoken by 1.6% (e.g. too young to talk). New Zealand Sign Language was known by 0.8%. The percentage of people born overseas was 28.2, compared with 28.8% nationally.

Religious affiliations were 26.9% Christian, 2.6% Hindu, 0.6% Islam, 0.3% Māori religious beliefs, 0.9% Buddhist, 0.6% New Age, 0.4% Jewish, and 1.7% other religions. People who answered that they had no religion were 60.9%, and 5.4% of people did not answer the census question.

Of those at least 15 years old, 2,835 (49.8%) people had a bachelor's or higher degree, 2,118 (37.2%) had a post-high school certificate or diploma, and 741 (13.0%) people exclusively held high school qualifications. The median income was $61,300, compared with $41,500 nationally. 1,578 people (27.7%) earned over $100,000 compared to 12.1% nationally. The employment status of those at least 15 was 3,456 (60.7%) full-time, 774 (13.6%) part-time, and 144 (2.5%) unemployed.

Individual statistical areas
Name	Area (km^{2})	Population	Density (per km^{2})	Dwellings	Median age	Median income
Island Bay West	1.17	3,234	2,764	1,194	38.3 years	$61,900
Island Bay East	0.98	3,594	3,667	1,332	39.2 years	$60,800
New Zealand					38.1 years	$41,500

== Arts and culture ==
- Rita Angus, artist

While living in Wellington in the 1960s, Rita Angus painted a number of scenes in Island Bay. Boats, Island Bay is one of her best-loved paintings.

- Literature

Children's authors Fleur Beale, Suzanne Main and Brigid Feehan all live in Island Bay.

- Red Mole, theatre

Alan Brunton and Sally Rodwell of the Red Mole experimental theatre group, were based in Island Bay from 1988 until Brunton's death in 2002.

== Education ==
Island Bay School is a co-educational state primary school for Year 1 to 6 students, with a roll of 335 as of July 2026. It opened in 1900.

St Francis de Sales School is a co-educational state-integrated Catholic primary school for Year 1 to 8 students, with a roll of 196. It opened in 1905 on Avon Street. It moved in 1926 and changed its name to Saint Madeline Sophie's School. It became state-integrated in 1983, and moved to its current site and adopted the name of St Francis de Sales School in 1985. The school's full name is now Te Kura o Hāto Werahiko te Hēra - St Francis de Sales School.

== Gallery ==
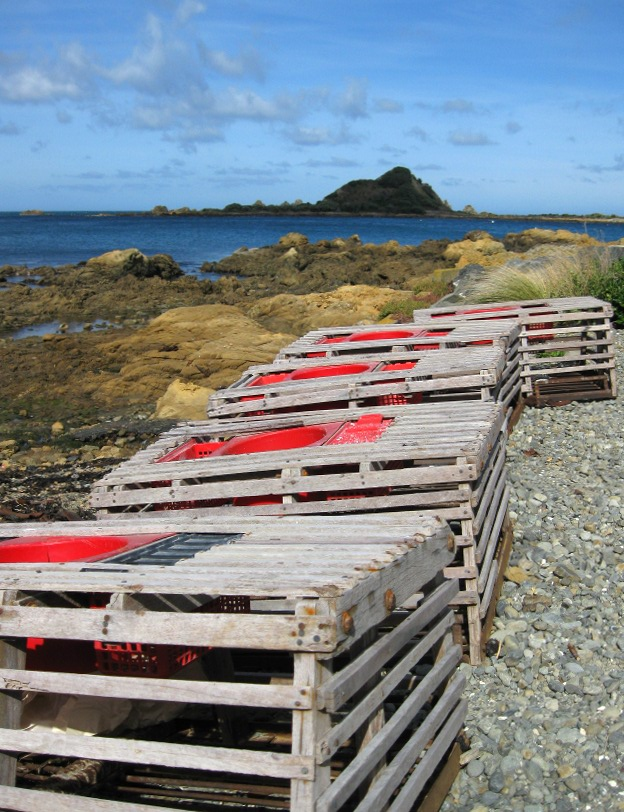
Empty craypots on Island Bay foreshore; Tapu Te Ranga Island in background

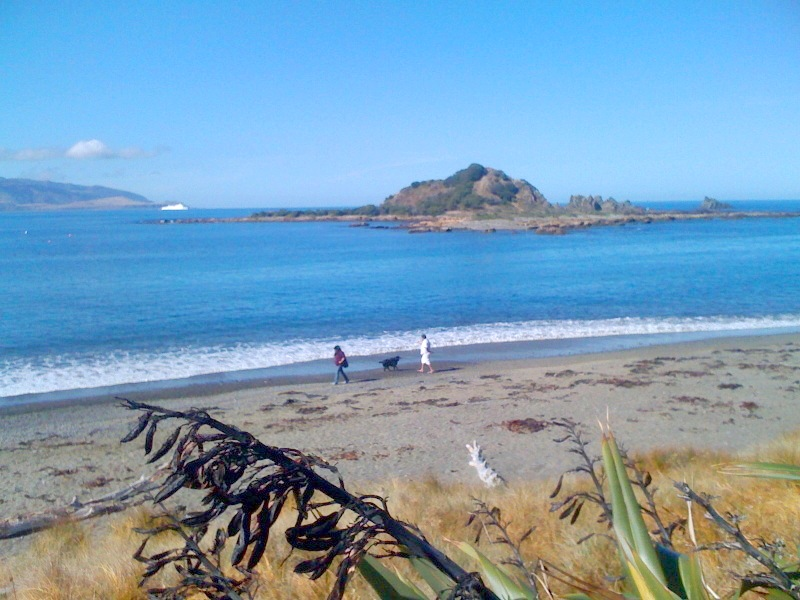
The beach at Island Bay; Interislander ferry and Tapu Te Ranga Island in background

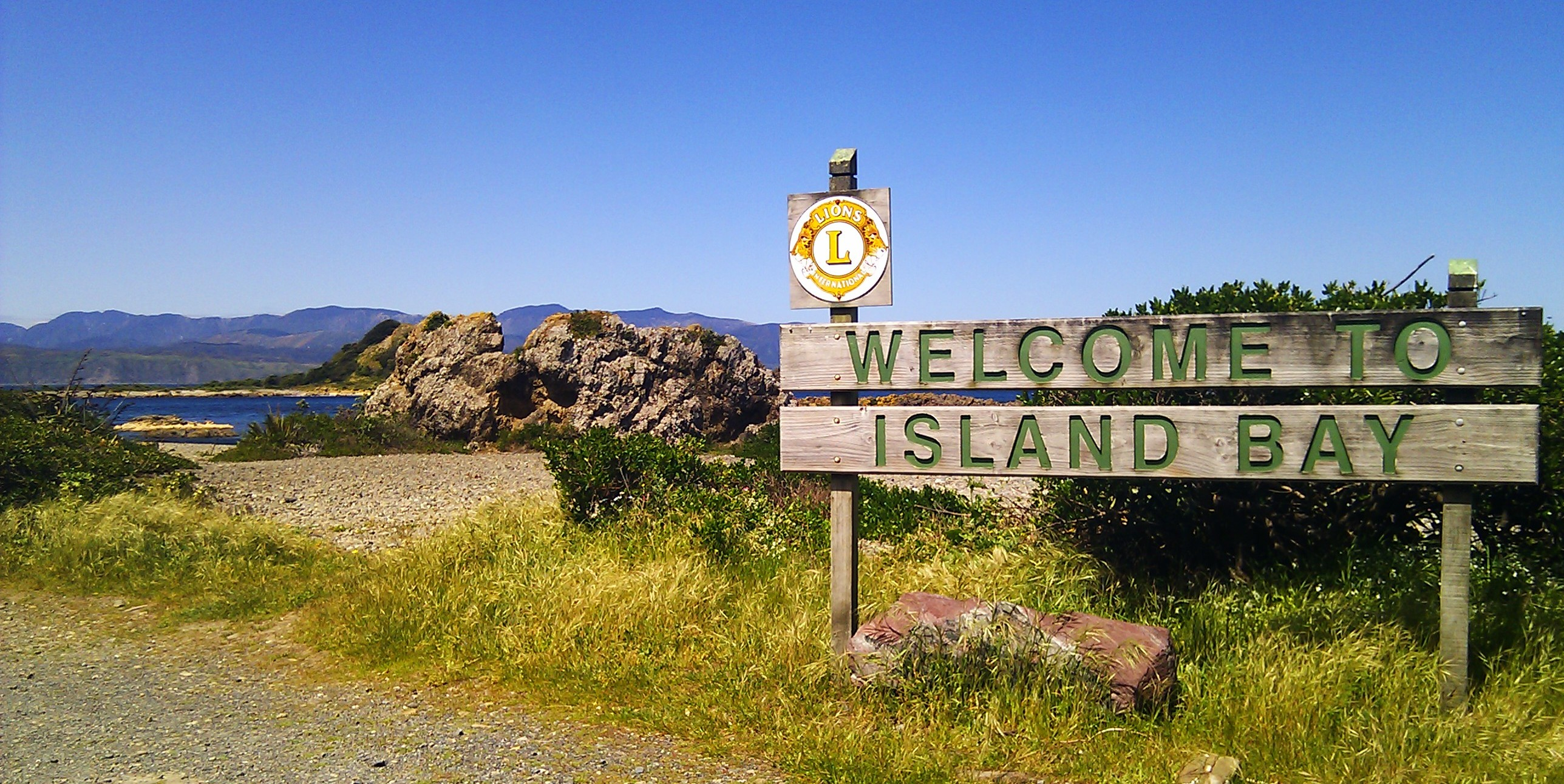
Welcome sign on The Esplanade, Island Bay 2010

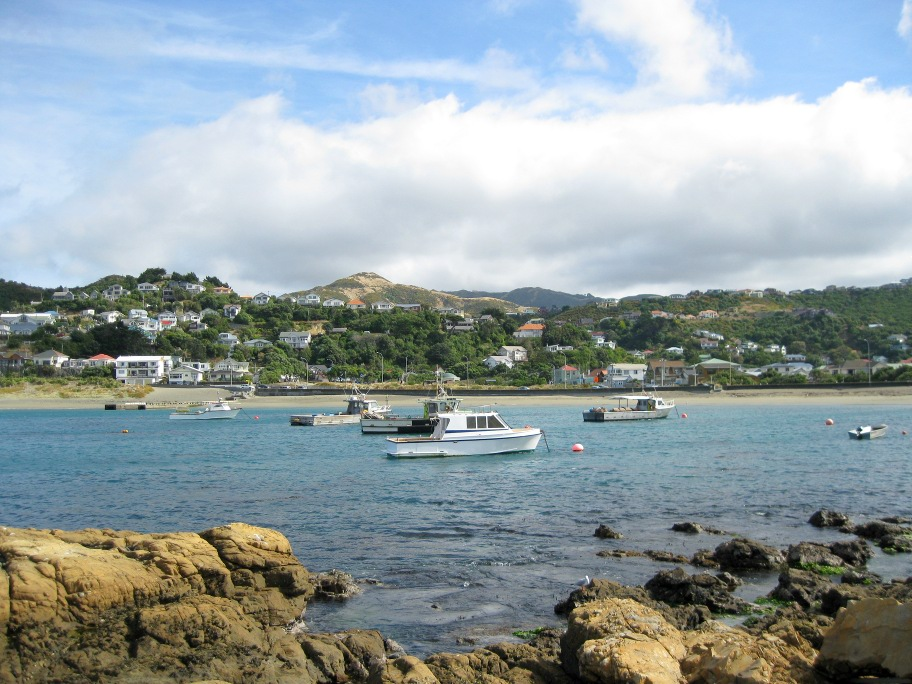
Fishing boats in Island Bay

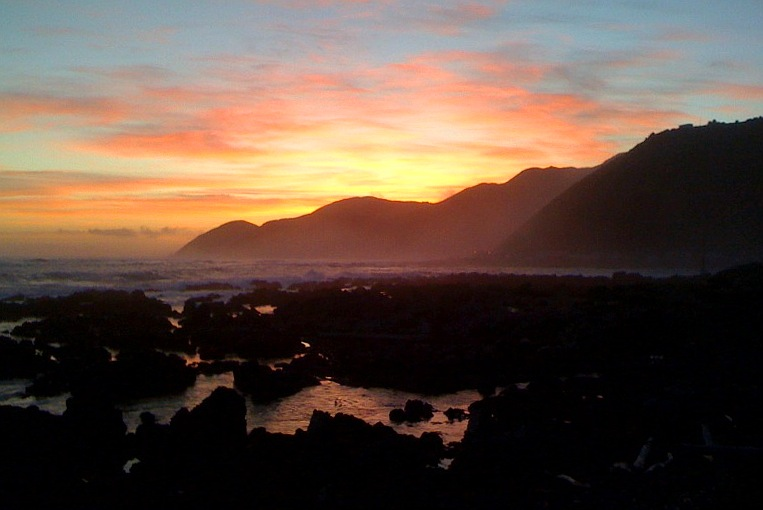
Sunset over Red Rocks, west of Island Bay

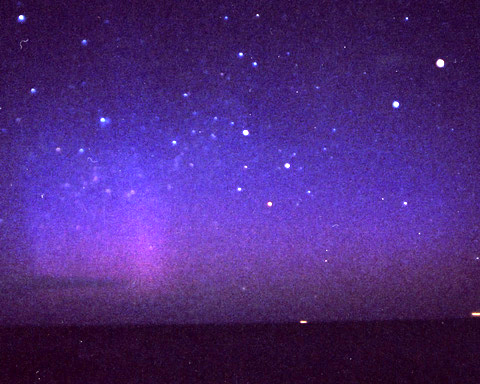
Aurora Australis from Wellington's South Coast
