= Tapu Te Ranga Marae =

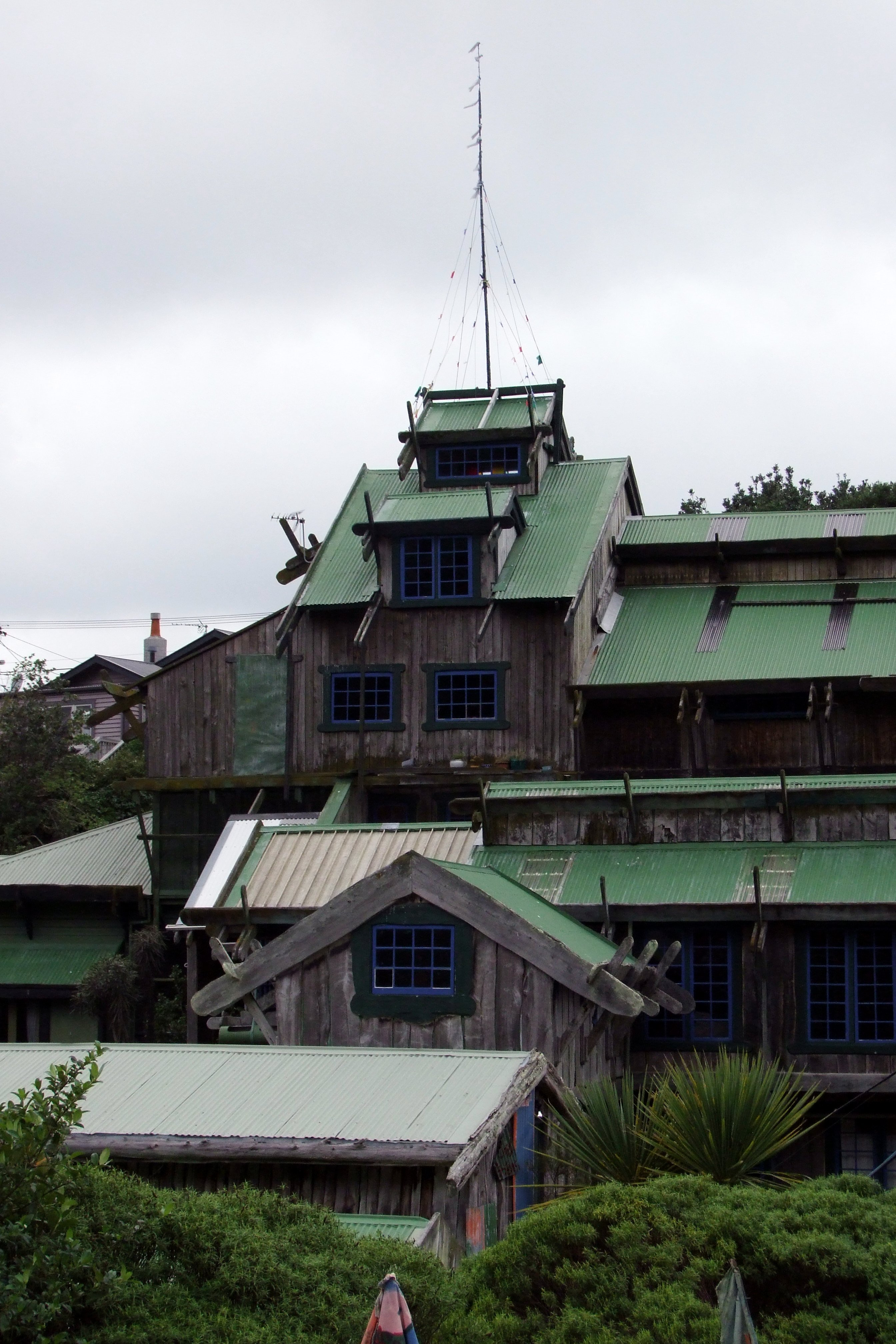
- Tapu Te Ranga Marae in 2013
- Interactive map of the Tapu Te Ranga Marae area

General information
- Type: Marae
- Architectural style: Contemporary Maori
- Location: Island Bay, Wellington, New Zealand, 44 Rhine Street, Island Bay, Wellington
- Coordinates: 41.3313°S 174.769918°E
- Construction started: 1974
- Destroyed: 9 June 2019 (fire)

Height
- Height: 131 feet (40 m)

Technical details
- Floor count: 10

Tapu Te Ranga Marae is located in Island Bay, Wellington, New Zealand. The marae was founded in 1974 by Māori playwright Bruce Stewart, who lived there until his death in 2017. The ten storey high structure was built largely by hand from recycled materials over a 30 year period, as a tribute to Stewart's mother, Hinetai Hirini. It was listed as a heritage site, but was destroyed by fire in 2019.

== History ==
Tapu Te Ranga Marae was built by Stewart, who "got out of jail with $25 and a dream" in 1974. Upon release, he found that many young Māori had come to Wellington with the promise of jobs. However, many were unable to find work. He began picking them up in his van and taking them to workshops in the suburb of Newtown where they could learn to make furniture from recycled timbers. Later, he began taking them to a community art space called The Workshop to learn the art of carving.

In December 1974, a Pākeha man by the name of Joseph "Taffy" Williamson was murdered on Hopper Street in the Wellington suburb of Te Aro after he provoked 18 year old Rufus Marsh by yelling racial slurs. This led to media outrage and prompted then Mayor of Wellington, Michael Fowler, to visit Stewart. Fowler asked what could be done, and Stewart replied "we want to live Māori, that’s what the problem is, we want to live Māori.”

Stewart leased 24 hectares of land from the Home of Compassion and construction of the marae began, continuing for 30 years. This was led by Stewart with help from his whānau, tradesmen, local youth, and gang members.

The main building was built into a hillside, which was levelled by hand into seven sections using only pick and shovels. Its frame was constructed in segments using wooden cases used to transport vehicles from Japan. It also featured recycled timbers such as doors and stained-glass windows salvaged from demolition contracts.

The building was ten stories high and has been described as a "hand-crafted labyrinth of stairways and mystical rooms, of art and sculpture, a dream-land place." It was named Pare Waaka.

== Fire ==
At 12.30am on Sunday 9 June 2019 the main building of the marae complex caught fire and was completely destroyed. A number of people were staying in the building at the time, including a group of 27 children from the Ngaio Scouts and nine adults. All escaped unharmed. The fire was attended by over 50 firefighters. It is thought that the fire started by a spark from a brazier getting into a storeroom. After the fire it was revealed that Wellington City Council had deemed some of the buildings dangerous in 2015. Only one structure had a building consent.

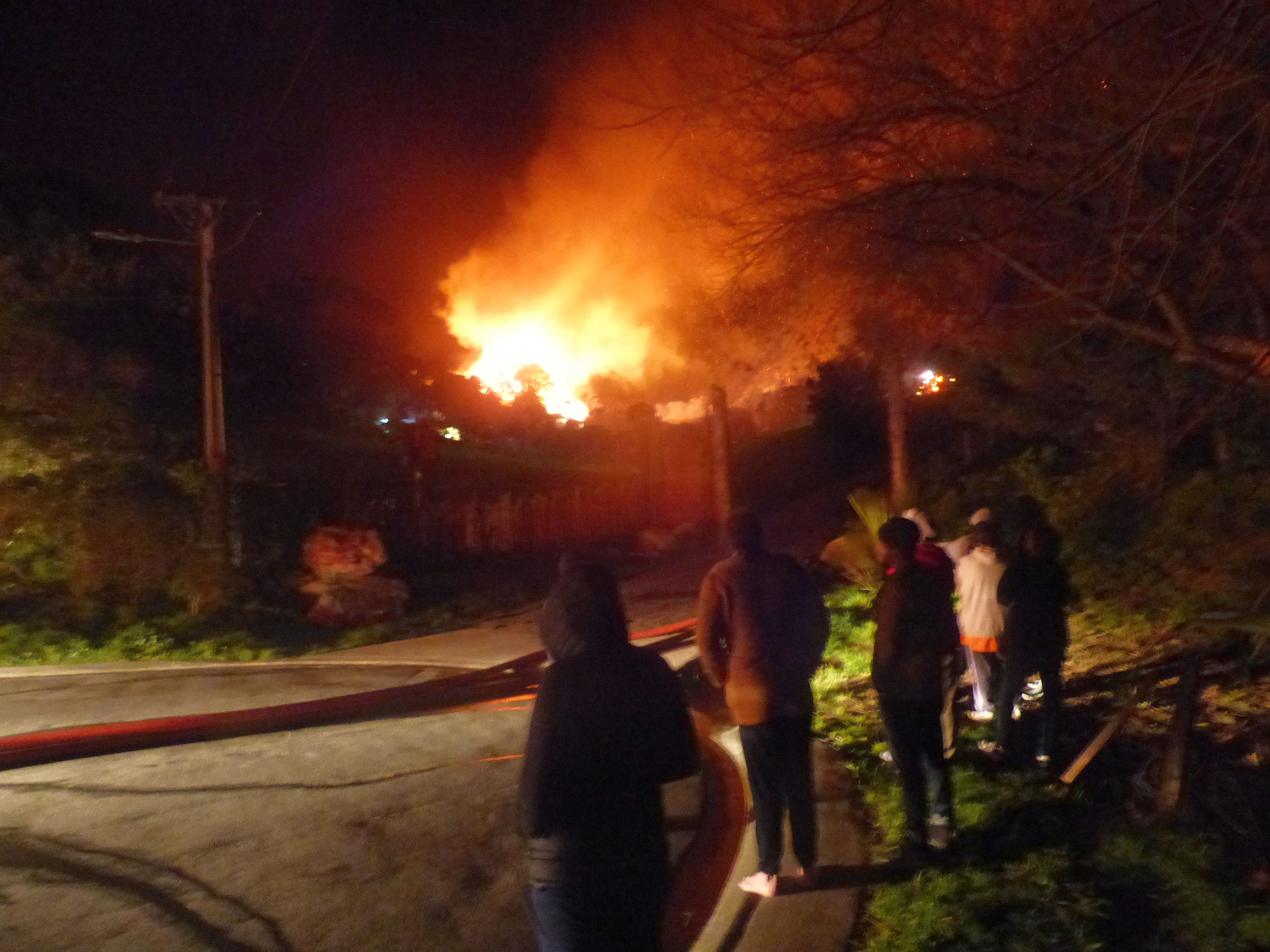
Tapu Te Ranga fire

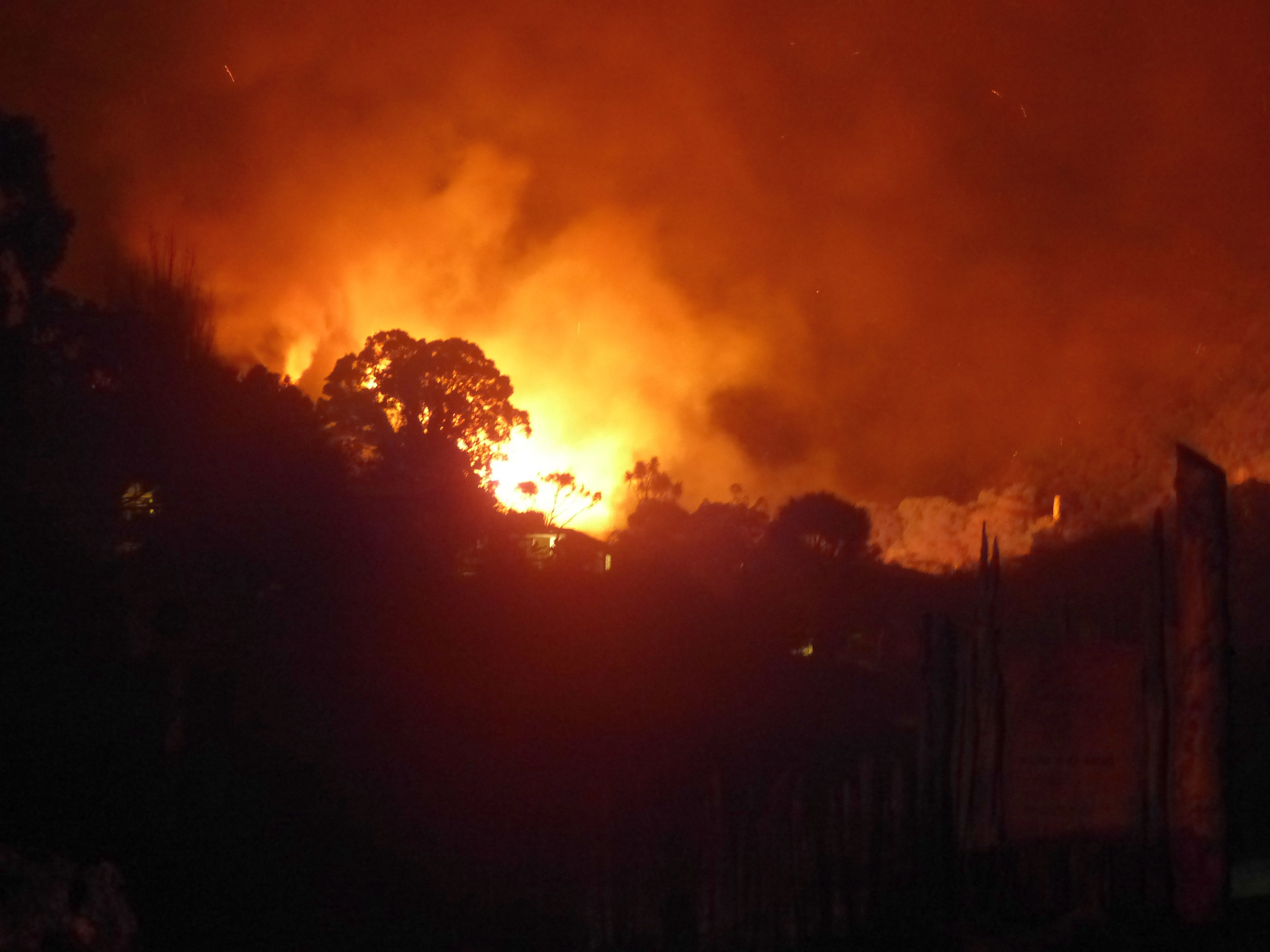
Tapu Te Ranga fire
