= Bruce Stewart (playwright) =

New Zealand fiction writer

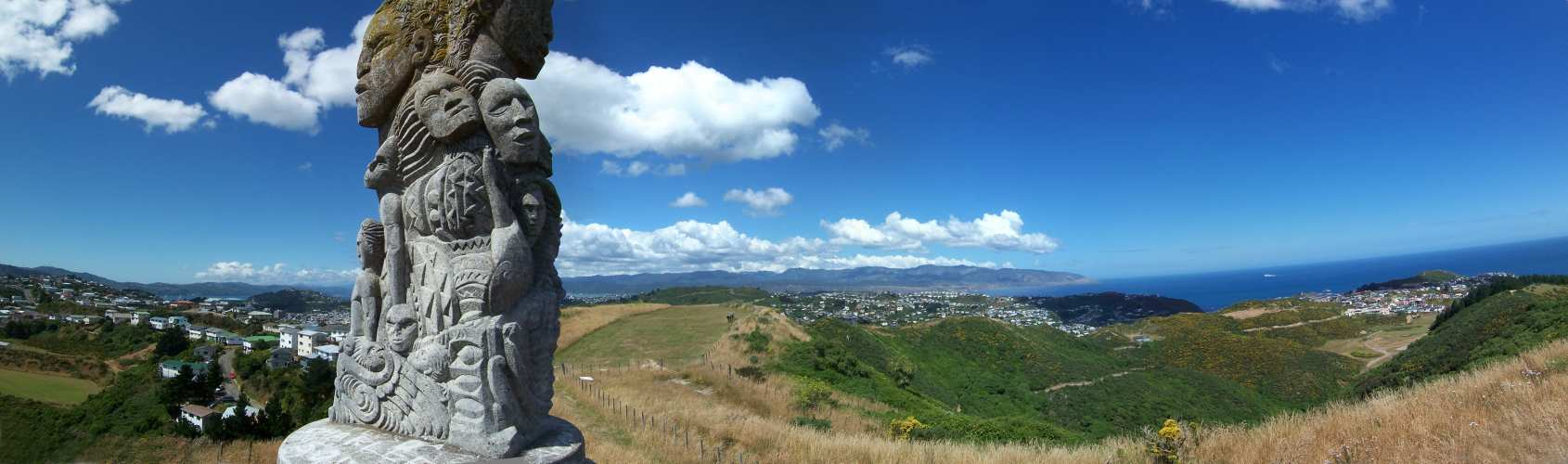
- Tawatawa Ridge sculpture
- Born: Bruce Richard Stewart; 5 August 1936; Hamilton, New Zealand
- Died: 28 June 2017 (aged 80); Wellington, New Zealand
- Education: Wairarapa College
- Occupation: Playwright
- Writing career
- Subjects: Anger, confused loyalties and spiritual aspiration of late-20th-century Māori
- Notable works: Tama, and Other Stories

Bruce Richard Stewart (5 August 1936 – 28 June 2017) was a New Zealand fiction writer and dramatist of Ngāti Raukawa Te Arawa descent. Stewart's work often expresses the anger, the confused loyalties, and the spiritual aspirations of late-twentieth-century Māori. He set up a marae called Tapu Te Ranga in the 1970s in Island Bay in Wellington, and lived there until his death.

== Biography ==
Stewart was born in Hamilton. His Pākehā biological father had no involvement with him, and his Māori mother Molly Daphne Hirini has said that her Tainui tribe frowned on mixed-race children. Stewart got his name from his stepfather Donald Lewis Stewart, who married Molly Hirini in 1938. Molly died in 1954. Stewart grew up in Masterton and was educated at Wairarapa College.

Stewart lived mainly in Wellington, where he founded Tapu Te Ranga Marae at Island Bay in the 1970s. This was a centre for debate and education in Māori culture and protocol and for the redevelopment of native bush until destroyed by fire in 2019.

Stewart was president of Ngā Puna Waihanga (Maori Writers and Artists Society) in 1982.

== Published and televised ==
Broken Arse was published in Into the World of Light (1982) and Stewart later rewrote it as a playscript, which was performed in Wellington in 1990 as part of the New Zealand Festival at the Depot Theatre as part of the Theatre Marae season by Te Rākau Hua o Te Wao Tapu. It was published by Victoria University Press in 1991.

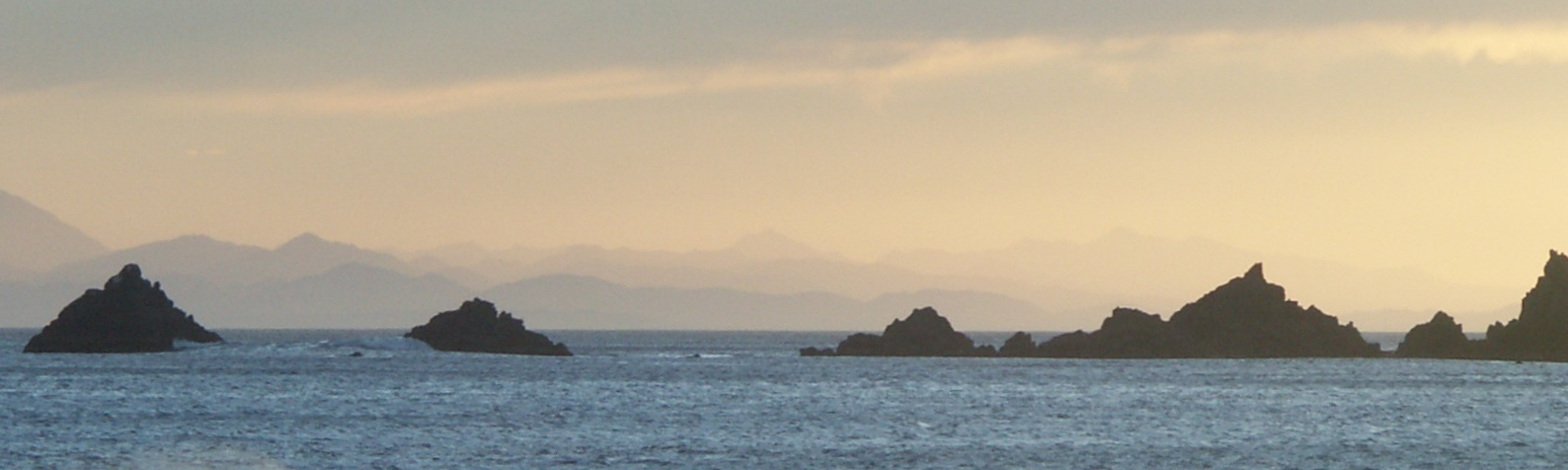
Looking across Taputeranga toward Te Waipounamu

== Books ==
- Tama, and Other Stories Auckland : Penguin, 1989.
- Broken Arse Wellington : Victoria University Press, 1991.

== Performance ==
Reviews of performance at Depot Theatre Evening Post p. 24; 26 Feb 1990. Budd, Susan. Dominion p. 11; 6 Mar 1990. Cooke, Patricia. Dominion Sunday Times p. 18; 11 Mar 1990. Welch, Denis. Listener 128(2634):108; 10 Sep 1990.

== Death ==
Stewart died at Tapu Te Ranga on 28 June 2017.

== Bibliography ==
Reviews of the book Tama, and Other Stories Auckland : Penguin, 1989.

- Eggleton, David. Evening Post p. 31; 27 May 1989.
- Mackrell, Brian. New Zealand Wildlife 11(88):32; Spring 1989.
- King, Michael. Metro 9(96):184–186; June 1989.
- Taylor, Apirana. Dominion Sunday Times p. 17; 4 June 1989.
- Duggan, Sally. NZ Herald 2:6; 19 Aug 1989. Faith, Rangi. Listener 124(2572):71; 24 June 1989.
- McEldowney, W.J.. Otago Daily Times p. 24; 5 July 1989.

Reviews of the book: Broken Arse Wellington : Victoria University Press, 1991.

- Dale, Judith. New Zealand Books 1(4):8; March 1992.
- Cooke, Patricia. Dominion Sunday Times p. 20; 29 Sep 1991.

Other:

- "Broken Arse on at Depot". Evening Post. p. 24; 26 Feb 1990.
- "Ko wai ahau?" Mana : the Maori news magazine for all New Zealanders. 1:94–95; Jan/Feb 1993.
- Interview with Stewart, Neville Glasgow, Directions (1995).
- McLauchlan, Gordon. 'A new beginning for Maori writing?' Auckland Metro 10:21; April 1982.
- Galloway, Penny. 'Waitangi writings.' Listener 120(2502):8; 6 Feb 1988. Includes comment on Stewart.
- McNaughton, Iona. 'Tales of an angry young Maori.' Dominion p. 10; 27 May 1989.
- O'Hare, N. 'Faith and work.' Listener 125(2594) Sup.p. 85-87; 20 Nov 1989. Interview.
- Lucas, J. 'Stewart's marae threatened.' Evening Post p. 1,3; 25 May 1991.
- Wevers, Lydia. 'Short fiction by Maori writers.' Commonwealth : Essays and Studies 16(2):26–33; Spring, ::1994. Includes comment on Bruce Stewart.
- Donaldson, Lana Simmons. 'Willing to conform only to nature.' Kia Hiwa Ra : National Maori Newspaper 58:8, 24; Nov 1997. Profile.
- Heim, Otto. Writing Along Broken Lines: Violence and Ethnicity in Contemporary Maori Fiction. Auckland: ::Auckland University Press, 1998.
- Collins, Heeni. 'Heroes on the hill.' Evening Post p. 13 25 Sep 1999. Discusses statue erected by Stewart ::on Tawatawa Ridge, Island Bay, of Te Rauparaha and Te Rangihaeata.
