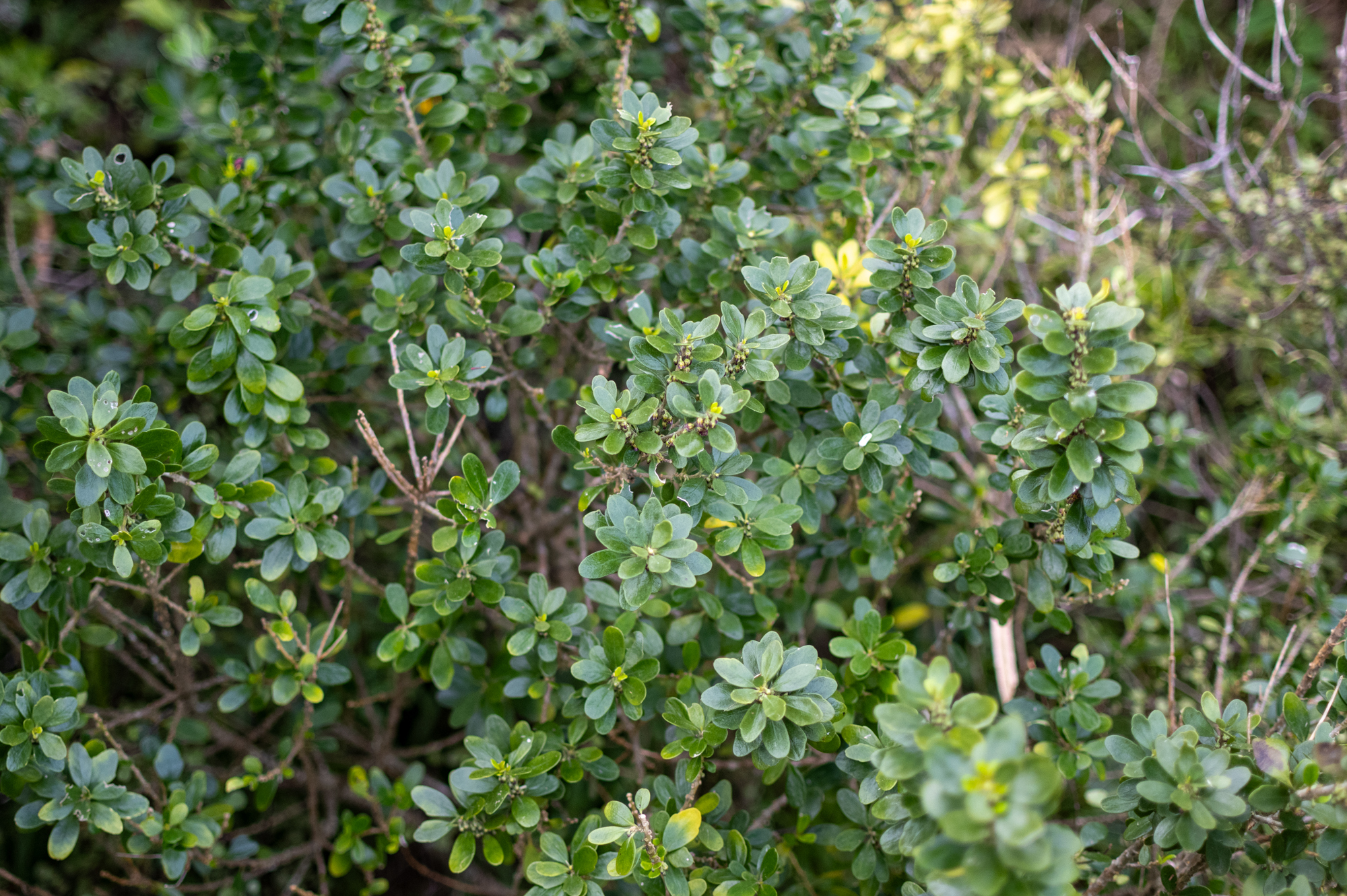

Conservation status
- Declining (NZ TCS)

Scientific classification
- Kingdom: Plantae
- Clade: Tracheophytes
- Clade: Angiosperms
- Clade: Eudicots
- Clade: Rosids
- Order: Malpighiales
- Family: Violaceae
- Genus: Melicytus
- Species: M. orarius

Binomial name
- Melicytus orarius Heenan, de Lange, Courtney & Molloy

= Melicytus orarius =

Species of plant

Melicytus orarius, or Cook Strait māhoe, is a species of flowering plant in the violet family Violaceae. It was originally described by New Zealand botanist Peter Heenan and colleagues in 2017. M. orarius is endemic to New Zealand on the North Island and South Island. It is listed as At Risk - Declining in the New Zealand Threat Classification for vascular plants.

== Description ==
A hermaphroditic, small (2.5 m (8 ft 2 in)) Melicytus bush with obovate leaves with a retuse apex, and purple-margined petals. It can grow prostrate in exposed conditions.

== Taxonomy ==
Melicytus orarius is in the family Violaceae. It was described in 2017 by New Zealand botanists Peter Heenan, Peter de Lange, Shannel Courtney and Brian Molloy. Previously, it had been considered a variable population of Melicytus obovatus, which was originally described by Thomas Kirk in 1895. That species was combined with Melicytus in 1987 by P.J. Garnock-Jones. Melicytus was originally erected for similar plants from Lord Howe Island and Norfolk Island.

The holotype specimen collected by de Lange from Point Howard on Wellington Harbour in August 1992 and is housed at the Allan Herbarium in Lincoln (CHR 478453) with isotypes at the Auckland War Memorial Museum herbarium and Te Papa.

The species epithet orarius is the adjectival form of the Latin ōra, meaning shore, and refers to the coastal habitat where this species is found.

== Distribution and habitat ==
Melicytus orarius is endemic to New Zealand, found only near the Cook Strait, on the North and South Island islands, and nearby islets.

The species is found in exposed headlands and rocks near the sea. It is ornithocoprophilous, as it may require extensive guano deposits from seabirds in order to thrive in most of its environment. As well, seabirds tunnel create nests by tunneling into the dirt, which may provide soil turnover that helps the plant. Fluttering shearwaters, sooty shearwaters, flesh-footed shearwaters, fairy prions, diving petrels, and little penguins have all been associated with M. orarius.

Populations that are in compromised habitats such as farmed islands like Kapiti or in suburban Wellington (such as in the Oku Street Reserve) are now seen as relicts, while other populations on islets in the Cook Strait, especially in the Marlborough Sound, are still viable.

== Conservation status ==
The species is listed as At Risk - Declining in the most recent assessment (2023) of the New Zealand Threatened Classification for plants. This status is unchanged from its listings in the 2017 and 2012 assessments.

In addition to qualifiers PF ("Population fragmentation"), DPT ("Data poor: Trend) and DPS ("Data poor: size"), M. orarius also has the qualifier CI ("Climate impact"). The CI qualifier has been used by the Department of Conservation since 2021 to flag species in its conservation assessments that are "adversely affected by long-term climate trends and/or extreme climatic events."

Populations of M. orarius are in decline. In addition to climate change, other threats to M. orarius include invasive weeds and fire.

== Gallery ==
Close up of fruits

Habit near the sea

Close up of underside of leaf

Leaves

Flowers on branch
