= Jerusalem, New Zealand =

Settlement in Manawatū-Whanganui, New Zealand

Jerusalem
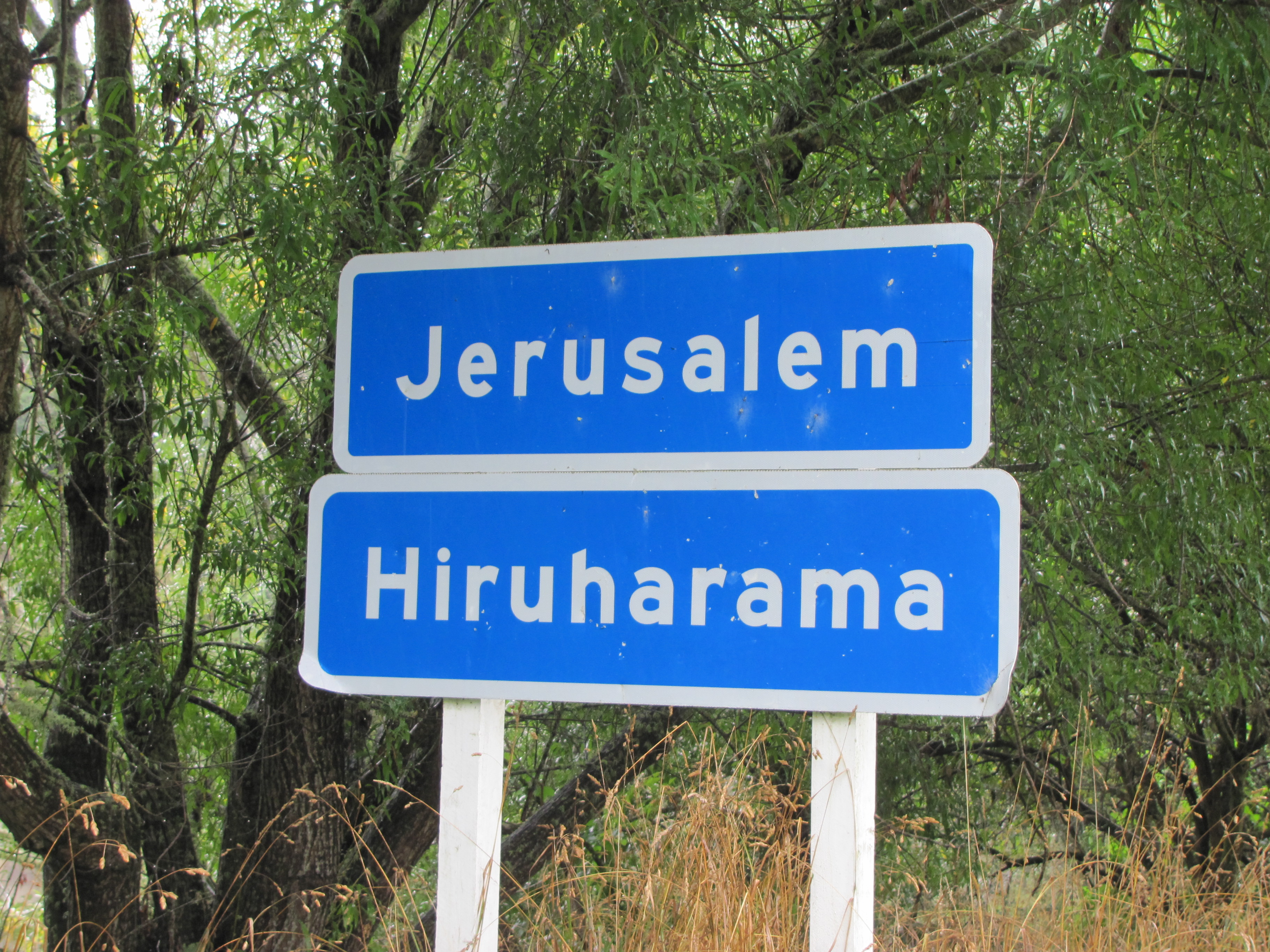
- Interactive map of Jerusalem
- Coordinates: 39.551°S 175.078°E
- Country: New Zealand
- Region: Manawatū-Whanganui
- District: Whanganui District
- Community: Whanganui Rural Community
- Electorates: Whanganui; Te Tai Hauāuru (Māori)

Government
  - Territorial Authority: Whanganui District Council
  - Regional council: Horizons Regional Council
  - Mayor of Whanganui: Andrew Tripe
  - Whanganui MP: Carl Bates
  - Te Tai Hauāuru MP: Debbie Ngarewa-Packer

Area
  - Total: 221.36 km^{2} (85.47 sq mi)

Population (2023 Census)
  - Total: 186
  - Density: 0.840/km^{2} (2.18/sq mi)
- Time zone: UTC+12 (NZST)
  - Summer (DST): UTC+13 (NZDT)
- Area code: 06

Jerusalem (Māori: Hiruharama) is a settlement 66 kilometres (41 mi) up the Whanganui River from Whanganui, New Zealand. Originally called Patiarero, it was one of the largest settlements on the Whanganui River in the 1840s with several hundred Ngāti Hau inhabitants of the iwi Te Āti Haunui-a-Pāpārangi. Unlike other Whanganui River settlements given transliterated place names by Reverend Richard Taylor in the 1850s, Jerusalem is usually referred to using the English version of its name. It grew into several small settlements, including Roma (named for Rome) and Peterehama (named for Bethlehem), founded by the remains of Taylor's congregation after the majority converted to Catholicism when a Roman Catholic mission was built in 1854.

Jerusalem was the isolated site where, in 1892, Suzanne Aubert (better known as Mother Mary Joseph) established the congregation of the Sisters of Compassion. They became a highly respected charitable nursing/religious order. A convent remains on the mission property, as well as the church which replaced the original building destroyed by fire in 1888, and Sisters of Compassion still care for them. Wiremu Te Āwhitu was the priest at the church from 1968 to 1989.

New Zealand poet James K. Baxter and many of his followers formed a community at Jerusalem in 1970, which disbanded in 1972 after Baxter's death. Baxter is buried there.

There are two Ngāti Hau marae grounds in Jerusalem: Hiruhārama or Patiarero Marae and Whiritaunoka meeting house, and Peterehema Marae and Upokotauaki meeting house.

== Demographics ==
Jerusalem locality covers 221.36 km^{2} (85.47 sq mi). It is part of the larger Upper Whanganui statistical area.

Historical population for Jerusalem locality
| Year | Pop. | ±% p.a. |
|---|---|---|
| 2013 | 159 | — |
| 2018 | 159 | +0.00% |
| 2023 | 186 | +3.19% |

Jerusalem had a population of 186 in the 2023 New Zealand census, an increase of 27 people (17.0%) since the 2018 census, and an increase of 27 people (17.0%) since the 2013 census. There were 87 males and 96 females in 60 dwellings. 1.6% of people identified as LGBTIQ+. The median age was 33.9 years (compared with 38.1 years nationally). There were 54 people (29.0%) aged under 15 years, 33 (17.7%) aged 15 to 29, 69 (37.1%) aged 30 to 64, and 30 (16.1%) aged 65 or older.

People could identify as more than one ethnicity. The results were 38.7% European (Pākehā), 82.3% Māori, 6.5% Pasifika, and 1.6% Asian. English was spoken by 95.2%, Māori by 21.0%, Samoan by 1.6%, and other languages by 1.6%. No language could be spoken by 3.2% (e.g. too young to talk). The percentage of people born overseas was 1.6, compared with 28.8% nationally.

Religious affiliations were 35.5% Christian, and 4.8% Māori religious beliefs. People who answered that they had no religion were 45.2%, and 12.9% of people did not answer the census question.

Of those at least 15 years old, 15 (11.4%) people had a bachelor's or higher degree, 72 (54.5%) had a post-high school certificate or diploma, and 48 (36.4%) people exclusively held high school qualifications. The median income was $24,200, compared with $41,500 nationally. 6 people (4.5%) earned over $100,000 compared to 12.1% nationally. The employment status of those at least 15 was 45 (34.1%) full-time, 15 (11.4%) part-time, and 12 (9.1%) unemployed.

=== Upper Whanganui statistical area ===
Upper Whanganui statistical area covers 1,849.89 km^{2} (714.25 sq mi) and had an estimated population of 1,280 as of June 2025, with a population density of 0.69 people per km^{2}.

Historical population for Upper Whanganui
| Year | Pop. | ±% p.a. |
|---|---|---|
| 2006 | 1,215 | — |
| 2013 | 1,152 | −0.76% |
| 2018 | 1,155 | +0.05% |
| 2023 | 1,191 | +0.62% |

Upper Whanganui had a population of 1,191 in the 2023 New Zealand census, an increase of 36 people (3.1%) since the 2018 census, and an increase of 39 people (3.4%) since the 2013 census. There were 636 males, 552 females, and 3 people of other genders in 453 dwellings. 1.5% of people identified as LGBTIQ+. The median age was 41.5 years (compared with 38.1 years nationally). There were 231 people (19.4%) aged under 15 years, 192 (16.1%) aged 15 to 29, 561 (47.1%) aged 30 to 64, and 207 (17.4%) aged 65 or older.

People could identify as more than one ethnicity. The results were 72.8% European (Pākehā); 43.6% Māori; 1.8% Pasifika; 0.8% Asian; 0.5% Middle Eastern, Latin American and African New Zealanders (MELAA); and 1.5% other, which includes people giving their ethnicity as "New Zealander". English was spoken by 96.7%, Māori by 14.6%, Samoan by 0.5%, and other languages by 3.5%. No language could be spoken by 2.0% (e.g. too young to talk). New Zealand Sign Language was known by 0.5%. The percentage of people born overseas was 6.5, compared with 28.8% nationally.

Religious affiliations were 32.7% Christian, 3.8% Māori religious beliefs, 0.3% Buddhist, 0.3% New Age, and 1.0% other religions. People who answered that they had no religion were 53.4%, and 8.3% of people did not answer the census question.

Of those at least 15 years old, 147 (15.3%) people had a bachelor's or higher degree, 546 (56.9%) had a post-high school certificate or diploma, and 261 (27.2%) people exclusively held high school qualifications. The median income was $33,200, compared with $41,500 nationally. 63 people (6.6%) earned over $100,000 compared to 12.1% nationally. The employment status of those at least 15 was 486 (50.6%) full-time, 153 (15.9%) part-time, and 36 (3.8%) unemployed.

== Jerusalem Foundling Home ==
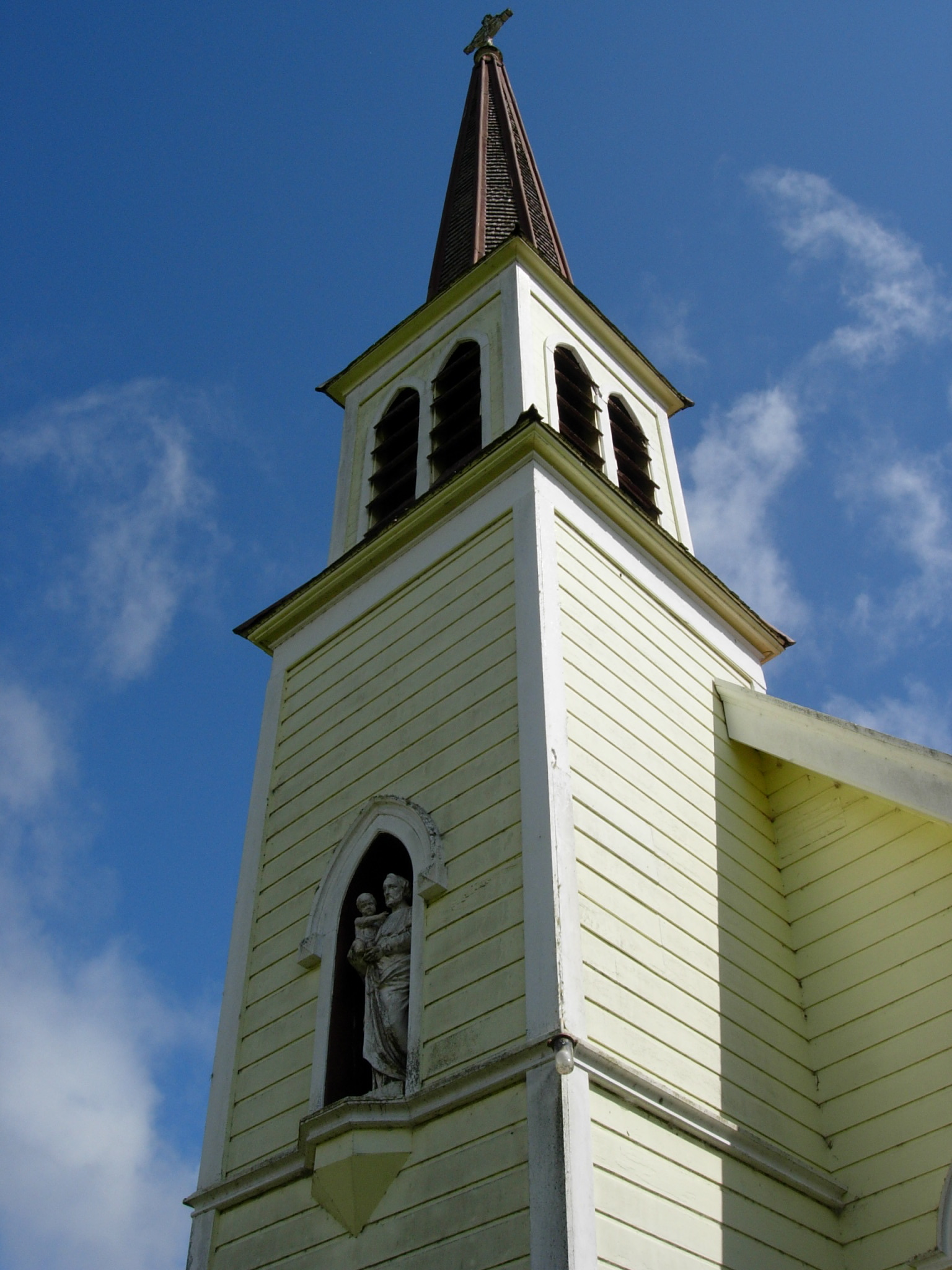
St Joseph's Church at Jerusalem

From 1891, the Jerusalem settlement took in some abandoned children from around New Zealand, the majority of whom had unmarried or widowed parents and were sometimes anonymously sent to the convent. In 1896 the Jerusalem Foundling Home was formally established.

Children of school age went to the settlement school run by the Sisters of Compassion, which was also attended by children from the local marae. Unable to attain classification as an Industrial School (which would allow the Home to receive Government funding for the orphaned children), from 1891 to 1895 children were placed on the roll of Industrial Schools in Nelson and Upper Hutt but remained at the convent.

From 1885, the Jerusalem settlement began taking in newborn babies. This came at a time when there was widespread publicity about and condemnation of baby farming, in particular, the case of Minnie Dean. Against legislation and popular opinion at the time, Suzanne Aubert, as leader of the Jerusalem Foundling Home, believed firmly that the anonymity of parents was essential to ensuring the safety of both them and their children. The register of children kept at the Home did not publicly list the names of parents, although Aubert herself kept a private register with parental information in case parents wished to reconnect with their children later in life. However, this meant the Home was ineligible for state funding at the time, due to ignoring legislation which required registers to list the names of parents and submit these to Government inspection.

In 1898, an inquest took place into the death of seven babies at the Home, with doctors at the time concluding that the cause of death was either measles or unsterilised cows milk. During this inquest, the Home was criticised for its secrecy around Government inspection.

== Notable people ==
- Suzanne Aubert established a religious community at Jerusalem in 1892
- Earl Bamber (born 1990), racing driver, learned to drive at Jerusalem
- James K. Baxter, poet and playwright, established a community at Jerusalem in 1970 (without his wife, Jacquie Sturm) and was later buried there
- Wiremu Te Āwhitu (28 July 1914 – 29 July 1994), the first Māori to be ordained a Roman Catholic priest, lived at Jerusalem from 1968 till 1989

== Climate ==
Climate data for Jerusalem (1951–1980)
| Month | Jan | Feb | Mar | Apr | May | Jun | Jul | Aug | Sep | Oct | Nov | Dec | Year |
|---|---|---|---|---|---|---|---|---|---|---|---|---|---|
| Mean daily maximum °C (°F) | 23.6 (74.5) | 23.7 (74.7) | 22.2 (72.0) | 18.2 (64.8) | 14.4 (57.9) | 12.0 (53.6) | 11.7 (53.1) | 13.2 (55.8) | 15.3 (59.5) | 17.3 (63.1) | 19.5 (67.1) | 21.7 (71.1) | 17.7 (63.9) |
| Daily mean °C (°F) | 17.3 (63.1) | 17.9 (64.2) | 16.3 (61.3) | 13.0 (55.4) | 10.0 (50.0) | 7.8 (46.0) | 7.1 (44.8) | 8.7 (47.7) | 10.3 (50.5) | 11.7 (53.1) | 13.7 (56.7) | 15.8 (60.4) | 12.5 (54.4) |
| Mean daily minimum °C (°F) | 10.9 (51.6) | 12.0 (53.6) | 10.4 (50.7) | 7.8 (46.0) | 5.5 (41.9) | 3.6 (38.5) | 2.5 (36.5) | 4.2 (39.6) | 5.3 (41.5) | 6.1 (43.0) | 7.9 (46.2) | 9.9 (49.8) | 7.2 (44.9) |
| Average rainfall mm (inches) | 93 (3.7) | 119 (4.7) | 103 (4.1) | 86 (3.4) | 146 (5.7) | 152 (6.0) | 170 (6.7) | 152 (6.0) | 116 (4.6) | 116 (4.6) | 118 (4.6) | 189 (7.4) | 1,560 (61.5) |
Source: NIWA
