= Wiremu Te Āwhitu =

New Zealand Catholic priest (1914–1994)

Wiremu Hākopa Toa Te Āwhitu (28 July 1914 – 29 July 1994) was the first Māori to be ordained a Roman Catholic priest. He was born at Ōkahukura, north of Taumarunui, in the central North Island, and was of Ngāti Hāuaroa (Ngāti Hāua) and Ngāti Maniapoto descent. After his ordination in 1944 he worked at Ōtaki in 1945 and 1946 and then in Hawke's Bay for 11 years. He suffered a stroke in 1958 and spent several years recuperating. He resumed ministry in Taranaki in 1966. He moved to Jerusalem on the Whanganui River in 1968 and spent 21 years there, including the period when poet James K. Baxter lived there and attended his church services. He retired to Ōkahukura in 1989.

== Sources ==
- John Newton, The Double Rainbow: James K. Baxter, Ngāti Hau and the Jerusalem Commune, Victoria University Press, Wellington, 2009.
