= Daughters of Our Lady of Compassion =

New Zealand religious order founded 1892

Daughters of Compassion
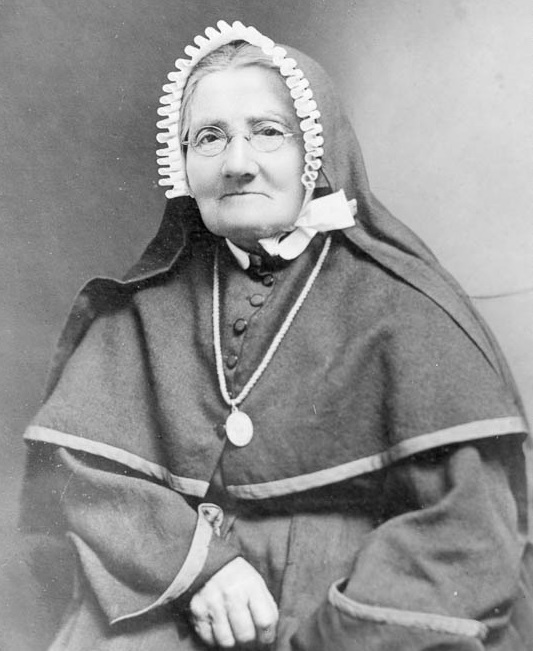
- Mother Suzanna Aubert, foundress of the Daughters of Compassion
- Formation: May 1892
- Founded at: Jerusalem, New Zealand
- Type: Religious congregation
- Members: 53
- Foundress: Suzanne Aubert
- Website: https://compassion.org.nz/

The Daughters of Our Lady of Compassion, also known as Sisters of Compassion, is a religious institute founded in May, 1892. The Catholic order was founded by Suzanne Aubert in Jerusalem, Hiruhārama, New Zealand.

As of 2023, there are four main centres in the Wellington region with another operation in Fiji.

== History ==
Suzanne Aubert arrived in New Zealand with a group of missionaries in 1860. Her vision was to become a member of the Third Order of Mary and to work with Māori. Aubert helped form the Holy Congregation in 1862 and they took over the Nazareth Institute near Freemans Bay in Auckland, which was a boarding school for Māori girls. Aubert taught at the school alongside Peata who was the first Māori nun and daughter of Ngāpuhi chief Rewa.

Before moving to Hiruharama she cared for the sick in Auckland and Hawkes Bay, where she gained knowledge of medicinal uses of native flora and fauna from Paeta and other Māori women 'tohunga rongoa' (healing specialists).

She arrived in Hiruharama in 1883 with the interest of reviving a Catholic mission on the Whanganui River. Fluent in French, English and te reo Māori she published a Māori-English phrase book while there. Funding for the mission was helped by Aubert's selling of home remedies derived from native plants, which she had learned of in Hawkes Bay.

The order was founded in Hiruharama, New Zealand in 1892.

Concerned with the many social problems in Wellington she left Hiruharama arriving in Wellington on 6 January 1899, accompanied by Sisters Magdalen, Agnes and Marcelle. Suzanne was by then becoming known for her herbal remedies and her care of abandoned and disadvantaged children. In Wellington the sisters very soon established a Home for people with incurable illness; a soup kitchen and a crèche. The Home of Compassion at Island Bay opened in 1907, later becoming the headquarters of the Sisters of Compassion, and the formation house where the Sisters did their religious training.

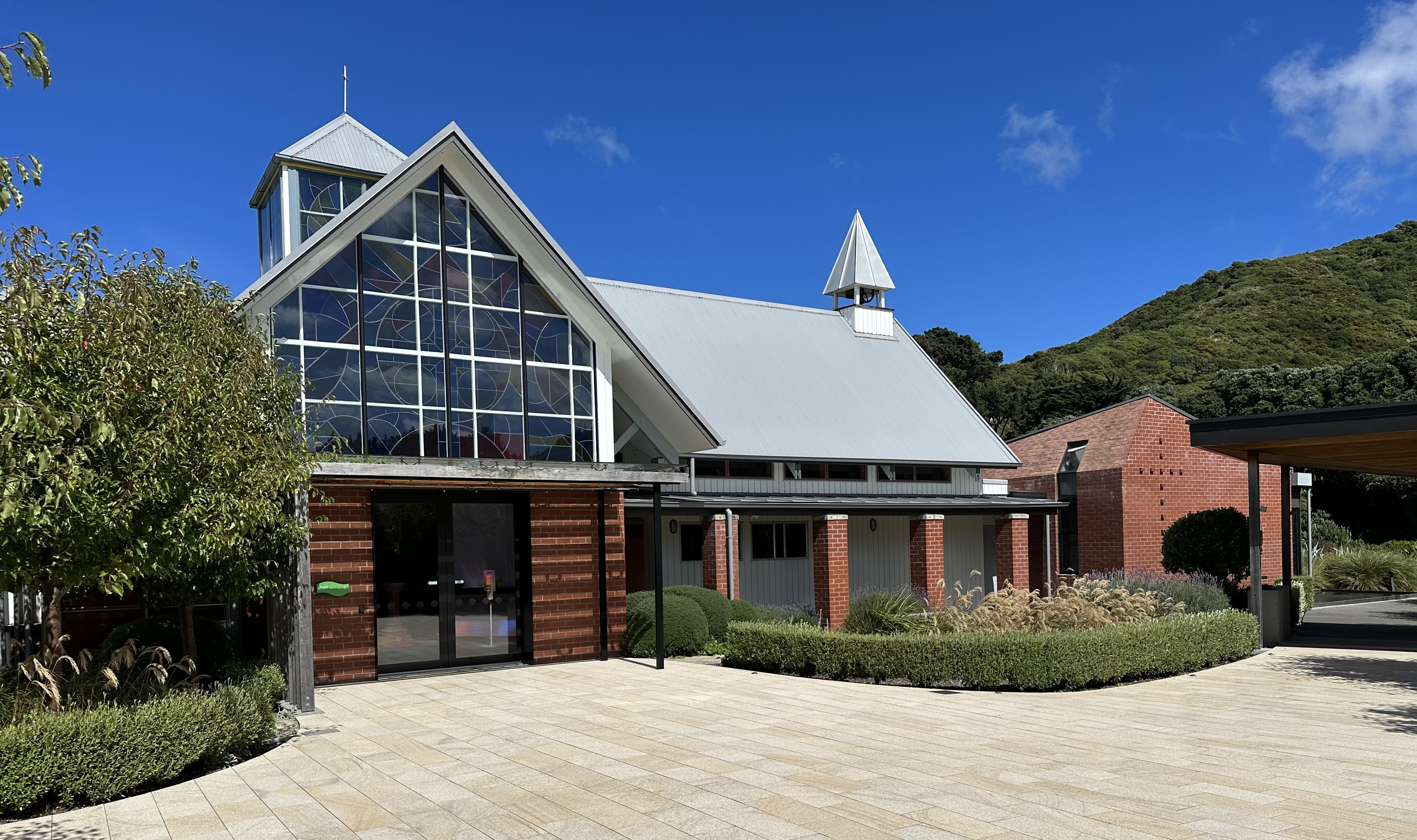
Our Lady of Compassion Chapel, Island Bay

In1913, frustrated with the church bureaucracy and wanting to obtain a Papal Decree for her Congregation, Suzanne Aubert, aged 78, travelled to Rome. In 1917 Pope Benedict XV conferred a pontifical Decree on the Congregation of the Daughters of Our Lady of Compassion. In 1920 Suzanne returned to Wellington as Mother General of the Order she founded.

Mother Aubert died at Island Bay on 1 October 1926, aged 91. Her funeral was reported in the newspapers as the greatest ever to be accorded to a woman in New Zealand.

== Current ministries ==
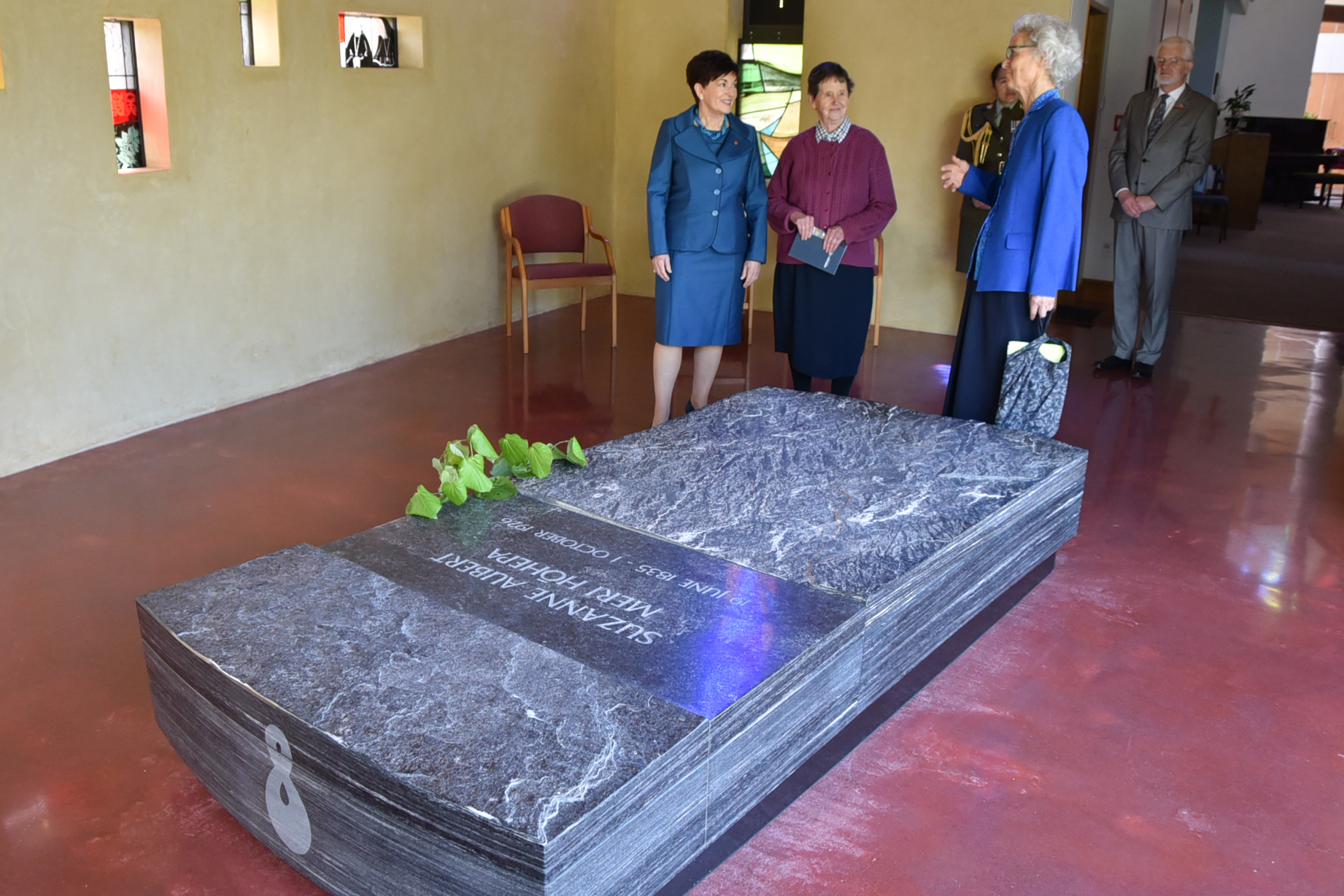
Suzanne Aubert resting place

The order has four main centers in New Zealand and one in Fiji. The order has had women enter the order and profess vows as recently as September 2015.

The Home of Compassion Island Bay is the site of the Sisters of Compassion headquarters and gathering place for the sisters. Located on the site is a Visitors’ Centre which celebrates the life and legacy of Mother Mary Joseph Suzanne Aubert. Aubert is buried on site. Jerusalem remains the Home of the Sisters of Compassion in partnership with the Tangata Whenua.

The order's current leader is Sr. Margaret Anne Mills DOLC.

At present the Sisters of Compassion are engaged in a range of ministries which aim to relieve human suffering. These include:

- Nursing and caring for the aged, disabled and sick at St. Joseph's Home of Compassion in Upper Hutt and St. Peter Chanel Home of Compassion in Fiji;
- education of school children and adults;
- pastoral care;
- prison and hospital chaplaincies;
- social work and counselling;
- parish ministry;
- feeding the needy in their Wellington soup kitchen;
- serving as advocates;
- providing residential accommodation for the elderly.

== After Suzanne Aubert ==
For some time Suzanne Aubert had foreseen the tremendous advantage of having the Sisters trained as general nurses. After many discussions with the Department of Health, a training hospital was added to the works at Island Bay in 1923. Following government legislation in 1930, the hospital was registered as a grade ‘A’ Training School in 1932.

The congregation grew, and in 1930 a convent was built adjoining the Island Bay Home, with a wing for the Novitiate. The following year the Aubert Home of Compassion was opened in Wanganui for the aged. In 1933, Archbishop Redwood blessed the foundation stone of St. Joseph's Home at Heretaunga, which housed male residents of all ages suffering from chronic diseases. In the same year a nursery for children under 2 years of age was opened in Auckland, and in 1939 a four-bed maternity home was added to this work. In 1939 a St Vincent's Home of Compassion was opened by The Minister of Health, Peter Fraser in Hafyanui Crescent, Ponsonby, Auckland.

In 1941, St. Anne's Home, for orphan girls, and chronically ill residents was opened at Broken Hill (Australia). A modern nursery adjoining the Island Bay Home was built during the same year. From 1945 - 1949 the Sisters helped with the domestic work at Holy Cross Seminary until the arrival of the Sisters of Cluny. In December 1949 four sisters went to Castledare Boys' Home (Australia) to help the Christian Brothers care for the 6- to 10-year-old boys, and remained there until December 1951.

On 28 March 1949, Cardinal Fumasoni Biondi, obtained the Decree of Final Approbation of the Congregation of the Daughters of Our Lady of Compassion and its Constitutions from Rome.

St Vianney's Home in Timaru was opened in 1951 and 1952 three more Homes of Compassion were established. Loreto Home in Wagga Wagga (Australia), St Raphael's in Carterton which included a registered primary school), and Chanel Home of Compassion (Fiji). The work in Fiji expanded when the Sisters taught at the newly opened St. Agnes primary school.

Bishop Warren of the Diocese of Wilcannia-Forbes (Australia) in 1965, invited the Sisters of Compassion to live and work among the Aboriginal people in Wilcannia. The Sisters provided a dispensary and education from kindergarten level to year 3. The Sisters were there until the end of 1988.

The following decades have seen the Sisters work as Hospital and Prison Chaplains, Pastoral and Social workers in Flaxmere, Tonga, and Christchurch.

Because of the renewed interest in Herbal Remedies, the Herbal Remedy (Rongoā) Analysis Project was initiated in 1993 to analyse the remaining medicines. The project also reconnected the Sisters of Compassion with hapū from Hawke's Bay and Peata's home area in the Bay of Islands, where Suzanne had earlier gained knowledge of rongoā, as well as from Ngāti Hau and Ngāti Ruaka on the Whanganui River. The project, led by Dr Max Kennedy of Industrial Research Ltd, was unable to decode the recipes. However, it successfully documented Suzanne Aubert's rongoā expertise and experience, defined and protected the 100-year-old intellectual property and led to a distinguished biotechnology award for Suzanne Aubert and for the Māori healers and herbalists who assisted her.

During recent years because of changes in society and the diminishing numbers of Sisters, the sisters have had to make the difficult decision to close several institutions. Today the Sisters continue the vision of Suzanne Aubert by addressing the needs of society in the ways that they are able. At Our Lady's Home of Compassion Island Bay, their services include a small Conference and Retreat Centre. In the Wellington inner city, the Suzanne Aubert Compassion Centre operates a soup kitchen and the Sisters visit people in need. In Upper Hutt affordable quality housing for the elderly is provided. Homes of Compassion for the care of the disabled and elderly are situated at Heretaunga and Suva (Fiji). The Sisters of Compassion work with people in Wellington, Wanganui, Jerusalem, Flaxmere, Wainuiomata, Upper Hutt, Wairoa, Auckland, Fiji, Tonga and Wagga Wagga (Australia). The sisters are involved in education, social work, pastoral ministries and care of the elderly. They are also Co-workers, employees, and Directors on Boards. The Mother Aubert Home of Compassion Trust Board established in 1917 holds the land, buildings and investments of the Congregation in trust for the general purpose of maintaining and carrying on the charitable works of the sisters.

In 2022 Deacon Danny Karatea-Goddard was appointed Co-Chief Executive Māori-Tumu Whakarae. Sister Margaret Anne Mills said of the appointment, "Our multicultural reality is only made real and will only be successful if we understand our bicultural foundation... It is an expression of our commitment to Te Tiriti o Waitangi.”

== The making of a saint ==
The process leading towards the canonisation of Suzanne Aubert as a saint is now underway. A Diocesan Inquiry was held in Wellington during 2004. All the information gathered during the enquiry was collated and sent to Rome for further investigation. Mother Suzanne Aubert has been declared 'venerable'.
