= City to Sea Walkway =

Walking path in Wellington, New Zealand

The City to Sea Walkway is an officially marked footpath which goes from central Wellington to Island Bay, New Zealand. It can be used as a self-guided walking tour of the main attractions of the city, as it makes its way on roads and trails from the downtown using the inner Wellington Town Belt. It is 14.4 km (8.9 mi) long and can be walked in either direction.

== Notable sights ==
The Walkway goes past several Wellington landmarks:

- Wellington Botanic Garden
- Wellington Cable Car
- Victoria University of Wellington
- Aro Valley
- Island Bay
