= Suzanne Aubert =

French Catholic nun (1835– 1926)

Venerable Mary Joseph Aubert DOLC
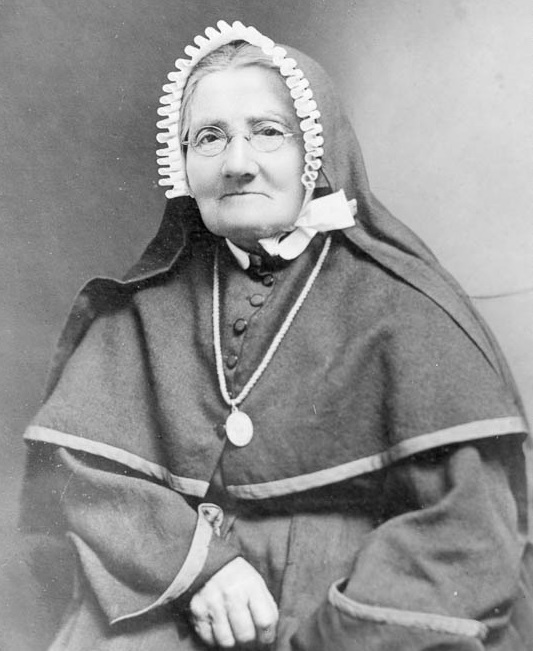
- Born: Suzanne Aubert; 19 June 1835; St Symphorien-de-Lay, France
- Died: 1 October 1926 (aged 91); Wellington, New Zealand

Suzanne Aubert (19 June 1835 – 1 October 1926), better known to many by her religious name Mary Joseph or "Mother Aubert", was a French religious sister who started a home for orphans and the under-privileged in Jerusalem, New Zealand on the Whanganui River in 1885. Aubert first came to New Zealand in 1860 and formed the Congregation of the Holy Family to educate Māori children. She founded a religious order, the Daughters of Our Lady of Compassion in 1892. Aubert later started two hospitals in Wellington; the first, St Joseph's Home for the Incurables in 1900, and Our Lady's Home of Compassion in 1907.

Aubert devoted her life to helping others. Her work took her from France to Auckland then to Hawke’s Bay, to the Whanganui River and finally to Wellington. And along the way, she founded a new Catholic congregation, cared for children and the sick, by skilfully combining rongoā and Pākehā science, and wrote books in te reo Māori, English and French adding significantly to a higher cultural understanding and literary heritage.

Aubert was actively engaged with the local Māori population and spoke te reo Māori well. She wrote a book New and complete manual of Maori conversation : containing phrases and dialogues on a variety of useful and interesting topics : together with a few general rules of grammar : and a comprehensive vocabulary which was published in Wellington by Lyon and Blair in 1885.

The process for Suzanne Aubert's beatification was commenced in 2010.

== Biography ==
=== Early years ===
Marie Henriette Suzanne Aubert was born at St Symphorien-de-Lay, a small village not far from Lyon. Aubert's mother, Clarice, worked for Church welfare organizations, and her father, Louis, was a huissier. Aubert had three brothers—Alphonse, Louis, and Camille—and the family was middle-class and respectable.

When Aubert was about two years old, she fell through the icy surface of a pond onto some rocks below and became temporarily crippled and blind. Because of this traumatic incident and the premature death of her disabled brother Louis, she developed an enduring empathy for people with disabilities. Aubert recovered the use of her limbs and most of her eyesight but was left with a cast in one eye. Her mother Clarice was diagnosed with cancer in 1845 but was cured - a recovery attributed by some to a miracle at the shrine of Fourvière.

Although Aubert's childhood illness slowed her education, she quickly made up lost ground at a boarding school under the care of the Benedictine nuns of La Rochette. Aubert went on to study music, fine arts, needlework, languages, and literature; she was an exceptional reader and read classical and devotional books. Aubert later taught herself Spanish in order to read the writings of St. Teresa of Avila in the original text. Aubert also learned cooking and household skills at home.

=== Missionary calling ===
Following the 19th century French custom among middle-class and upper-class families, Aubert's parents had arranged her marriage to the son of a family friend. When Aubert grew up, however, she refused to comply. Clarice sought the support of the much-respected Jean-Marie-Baptiste Vianney, parish priest of Ars and later St Jean Vianney, who instead told Aubert that she had made the right decision. God had other designs for her, he said. It was this encouragement she needed.

In 1859 Bishop Pompallier, visited his home town, Lyon, to recruit missionaries for his Auckland diocese and Aubert accepted the invitation. Aubert set sail from France to New Zealand on 4 September 1860 when she was 25. On board the ship were 23 missionaries heading to New Zealand including three other Frenchwomen, including Bishop Pompallier's niece (Lucie Pompallier), as well as Antoinette Deloncle and Pauline Droguet.

=== Arrival in Auckland ===
Suzanne Aubert and her pupils in 1869

Aubert had expected to be affiliated with the Third Order of Mary in Sydney. Instead, the ship sailed on to Auckland and the four Frenchwomen joined the English-speaking Sisters of Mercy. The French sisters wanted to help indigenous people and not, as expected, teach French, singing, sewing, and embroidery to the daughters of wealthy Aucklanders. As a result, they were transferred to the Nazareth Institute for Māori girls.

In 1862, Aubert and the Sisters of Mercy formed a new religious congregation in Freeman’s Bay named ‘The Holy Family’, under the jurisdiction of Bishop Pompallier, who was responsible for the teaching of Māori girls. Here, Aubert, now Sister Mary Joseph, became affectionately known by Māori as 'Meri'. Aubert's mentor in all things Māori was Hoki, known also as Peata, an influential and gifted relative of the powerful Ngapuhi chief, Rewa.

In 1868, Bishop Pompallier traveled to Europe with his niece, officially to seek support. His diocese was in total financial collapse and low on staff numbers. Pompallier never returned and died in Paris in 1871. After Pompallier left, Paeta and Aubert ran the school by themselves and the Native Schools Act of 1867 meant the government wasn't interested in providing support. Aubert, unwilling to give up and return to France, left Auckland to live and work at the Marist Māori mission station at Meanee in Hawke’s Bay with Father Euloge Reignier. Aubert's Māori pupils went back to their Kainga, or villages, and Peata, now blind, returned home to Northland and died not long after.

=== Hawke's Bay ===
Aubert, now 35 years old and no longer a member of a religious congregation, arrived in Hawke's Bay to play her own part in the revitalization of the Catholic Māori mission. Aubert settled into the French household, helped on the farm, taught catechism, trained the local choir, played the harmonium, embroidered and prepared the church for religious festivals, and soon became well known for her skillful nursing capabilities. She became well known to Māori and Pākehā, Catholic and non-Catholic communities as she moved around the district ministering to her people.

Aubert pinned her hopes for a revival of the Māori mission on Bishop Redwood who succeeded Bishop Viard as Bishop of Wellington in 1874 and became her lifelong supporter. In anticipation of the arrival of more priests, Aubert began revising and enlarging the 1847 Māori prayer book, compiling an English-Māori dictionary and producing a French-Māori phrasebook (which she followed up in 1885 with a groundbreaking Māori English phrase book). In 1879, Father Christophe Soulas arrived from France, familiarized himself with Māori families in the district, and constructed a new church at Pakipaki.

Three years later, Māori from the Whanganui River area on a trading trip asked Archbishop Redwood for a priest for their area. In 1883, Father Soulas and Suzanne Aubert left Hawke's Bay to go to Hiruharama, or Jerusalem, 60 kilometers up the Whanganui River.

=== Hiruharama-Jerusalem ===
In 1883, Aubert assisted Father Soulas as an interpreter and Māori cultural adviser along with two young Australian Sisters of St Joseph: Sisters Aloysious and Teresa from Whanganui. The two sisters from Whanganui were to teach in the school; their superior Mother Hyacinth arrived in Hiruharama to revive the Catholic Mission.

Aubert taught the Sisters the Māori language and customs; many children and adults came to the school, and became devout converts. In May 1884, and despite having impressed the locals with their dedication, the Sisters of St. Joseph decided to leave Jerusalem. Aubert was asked to lead and establish a branch of the Marist Third Order Regular of Mary. She recruited more teachers. Anne O’Rourke, Bridget Brownlie and Carmel Gallagher joined her in 1884 and became Sisters shortly after.

The Sisters at Hiruharama, in addition to the usual customs of religious life, taught and nursed, farmed newly cleared bush, tended an orchard, made and marketed medicines, sold fruit to tourists and raised homeless children, as a result the community grew and thrived.

=== Wellington ===
In 1899, Aubert and two sisters arrived unannounced in Wellington and quickly set to work. The much-needed home they planned for permanently disabled people would require trained nurses; so the Sisters of Compassion completed a St. John Ambulance Association course. Doctors took a personal interest in the training of the Sisters, and people of all creeds were welcomed; none were unwelcome.

The Sisters set up a soup kitchen that is still operating to this day. In 1903, the Sisters established a crèche for the children of single mothers and working parents.Aubert and the Sisters pushed wicker collecting prams, begged for food, and cast-off clothing for distribution to the needy, becoming a familiar part of the city's daily life.

In 1907, the impressive Home of Compassion was opened, initially for the care of children and babies. In 1910, a home for babies was opened in Auckland. Unfortunately for Aubert, the unconditional admiration that the people of Wellington had shown her for her work was not shared by some of the hierarchy. Problems surfaced. The Society of Mary in France, however, was not happy with the direction the Hiruharama community had taken. Archbishop Redwood intervened, and with Aubert they established the first religious congregation in New Zealand.

=== Rome ===
Unable to carry out her plans, Aubert traveled to Rome to enlist the support she required. She hoped to be granted the Decree of Praise which would ultimately give her order independence from the church in New Zealand.

While in Italy she nursed victims of the 1915 Avezzano earthquake, people in the slums of Rome, and joined the Italian Red Cross to nurse war wounded (though she was not able to join a frontline unit). She displayed a New Zealand St John Ambulance medal, which she passed off as the medal of a registered nurse.

In April 1917—four years and four months after Aubert arrived in Rome—Pope Benedict granted the Decree of Praise to the Daughters of Our Lady of Compassion. It was the only Catholic congregation born and growing to maturity in New Zealand, and the smallest congregation in the world ever to have attained this status.

=== Wellington ===
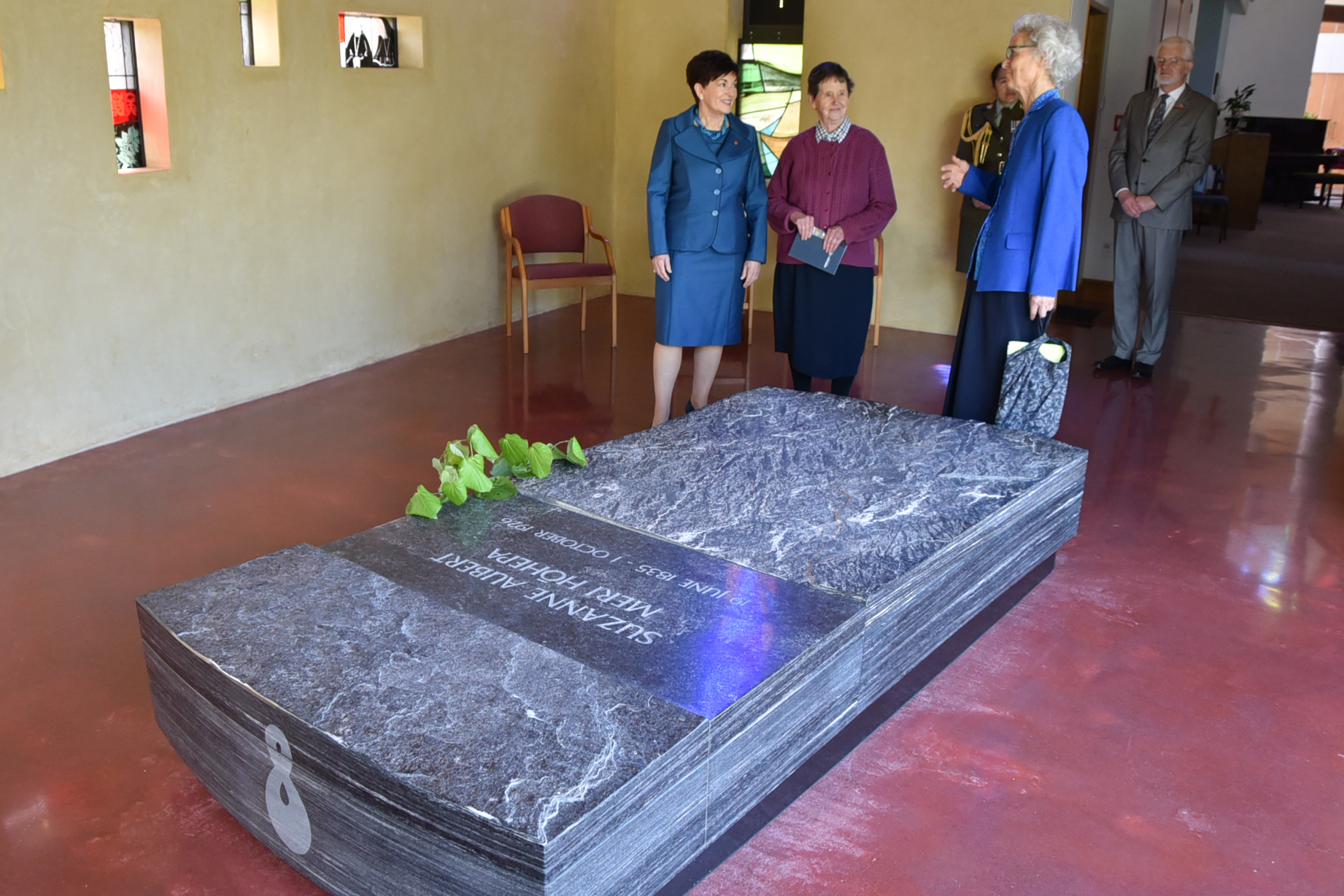
Aubert's final resting place, in the chapel of Our Lady's Home of Compassion, Island Bay, during a visit by the governor-general, Dame Patsy Reddy, on 28 October 2020

Returning to New Zealand in January 1920 and back in Wellington, Aubert wanted to ensure continuing security for the Sisters and to provide general hospital treatment and trained nursing free of charge to the poor of New Zealand’s post-war depression. She arranged for extensive alterations to the Home to provide a complete surgical section, including an operating theatre and wards. In 1922 the sisters began training for the surgical work the new hospital would provide. On 1 October 1926, Aubert died aged 91. New Zealand's newspapers spread the word and crowds gathered to pay their last respects. Her funeral at the church of St Mary of the Angels was widely reported to be the largest funeral ever accorded a woman in New Zealand.

== Legacy ==
Aubert is mentioned in the late poetry of James K. Baxter, who founded a commune in Jerusalem. The process for Aubert's canonisation as a saint was commenced with the appointment in 2010 of Maurice Carmody as postulator or advocate for that cause; it is currently before the authorities in Rome.

Two archives of material relating to Aubert have been inscribed on the UNESCO Memory of the World Aotearoa New Zealand Ngā Mahara o te Ao register: Aubert's Manuscript of Māori Conversation (1885), a handwritten English-Māori phrase book, was added in 2020, followed by Aubert's personal letter collection, which was added to the register in 2022.

Aubert is recognised as the first person known to grow cannabis in New Zealand and as the first green fairy.
