= Taputeranga Marine Reserve =

Marine reserve in New Zealand territorial waters

- IUCN category Ia (strict nature reserve)
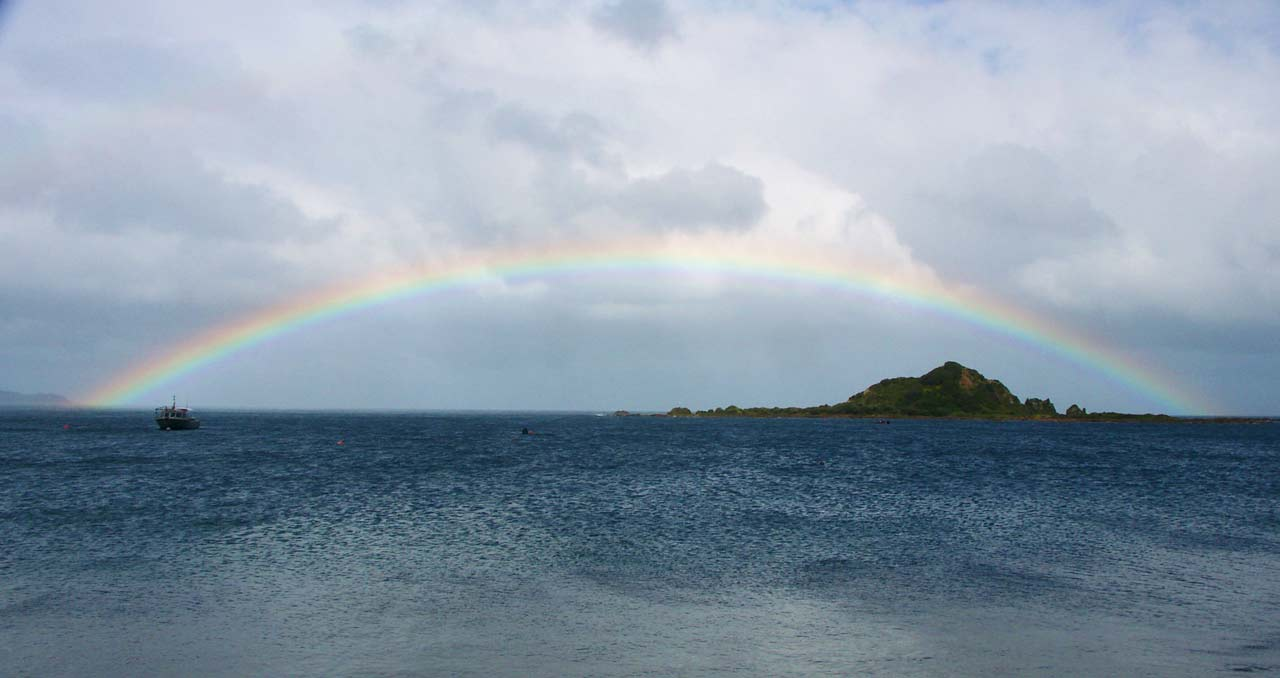
- A rainbow over Tapu Te Ranga Motu.
- Interactive map of Taputeranga Marine Reserve
- Location: New Zealand
- Nearest city: Wellington
- Coordinates: 41.353167°S 174.76337°E
- Area: 854.8 ha (2,112 acres)
- Established: 2008
- Governing body: Department of Conservation

Taputeranga Marine Reserve is a legally protected area of sea and coast along the southern edge of Wellington, in New Zealand. It was officially opened in September 2008. The reserve covers 855 hectares (2,110 acres) and includes all foreshore up to mean high water spring.

The reserve includes the waters of Ōwhiro Bay, Island Bay, Houghton Bay, and Princess Bay. It surrounds the island of Tapu Te Ranga. The coastline consists of rocky intertidal areas and sandy bays. Strong currents and the mixing of different waters bring nutrients and enable a diverse marine environment. The intertidal zone is mainly bare greywacke rock. Subtidal areas down to 16 metres depth are dominated by kelp forests, even deeper environments down to 60 metres depth are dominated by sponges and bryozoans.

This diverse environment includes around 400 recorded species of seaweed and over 180 fish species. Before the marine reserve, the area's abundant seafood was gathered, with some of the most important food species being pāua, kōura(crayfish), mariri(butterfish), and rāwaru(blue cod). Blue moki, marblefish, and spotty, banded, and scarlett wrasse can be found in the kelp forests. The area is home to octopuses, crabs, starfish, anemones, and sea squirts. New Zealand fur seals can be found basking on the rocks within the reserve, and orcas and other dolphins are commonly sighted in the water. Little blue penguins(kororā) breed on the shores of the marine reserve and feed within it.

The wreck of HMNZS Wellington is located within the marine reserve. The ship was deliberately sunk as an artificial reef off the coast of Houghton Bay in 2005.

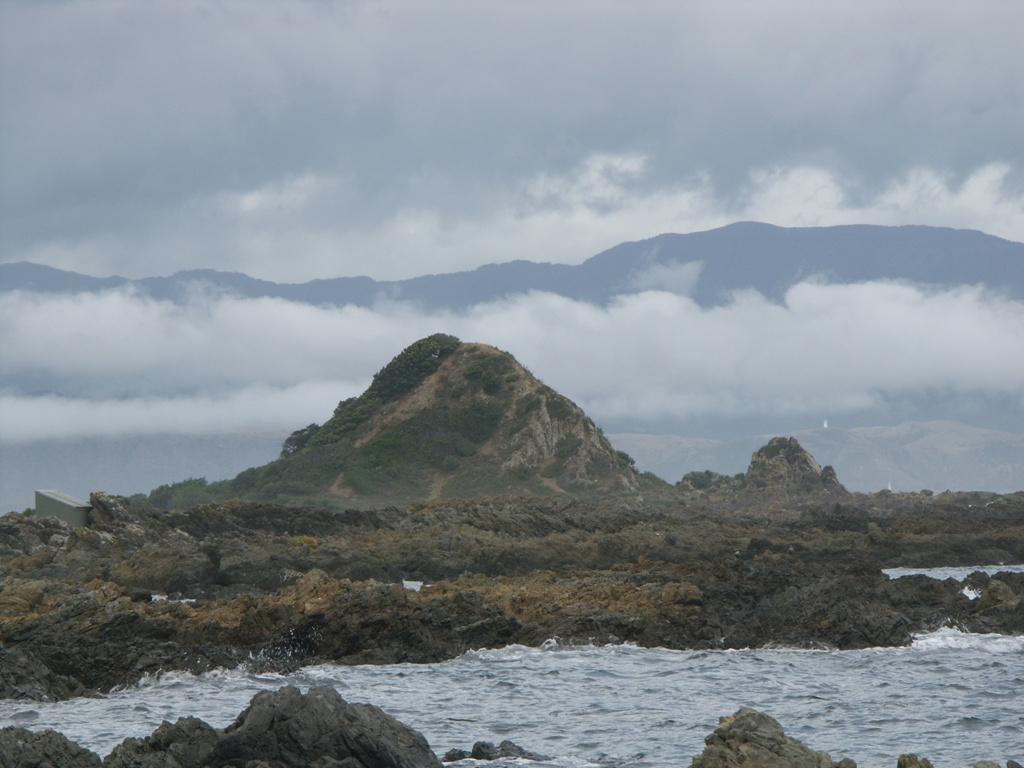
Tapu Te Ranga Motu

== See also ==
- Marine reserves of New Zealand
