= Princess Bay =

Bay in Wellington, New Zealand

Coordinates: 41.344427°S 174.788075°E

Princess Bay is one of the southern beaches of Wellington, New Zealand.

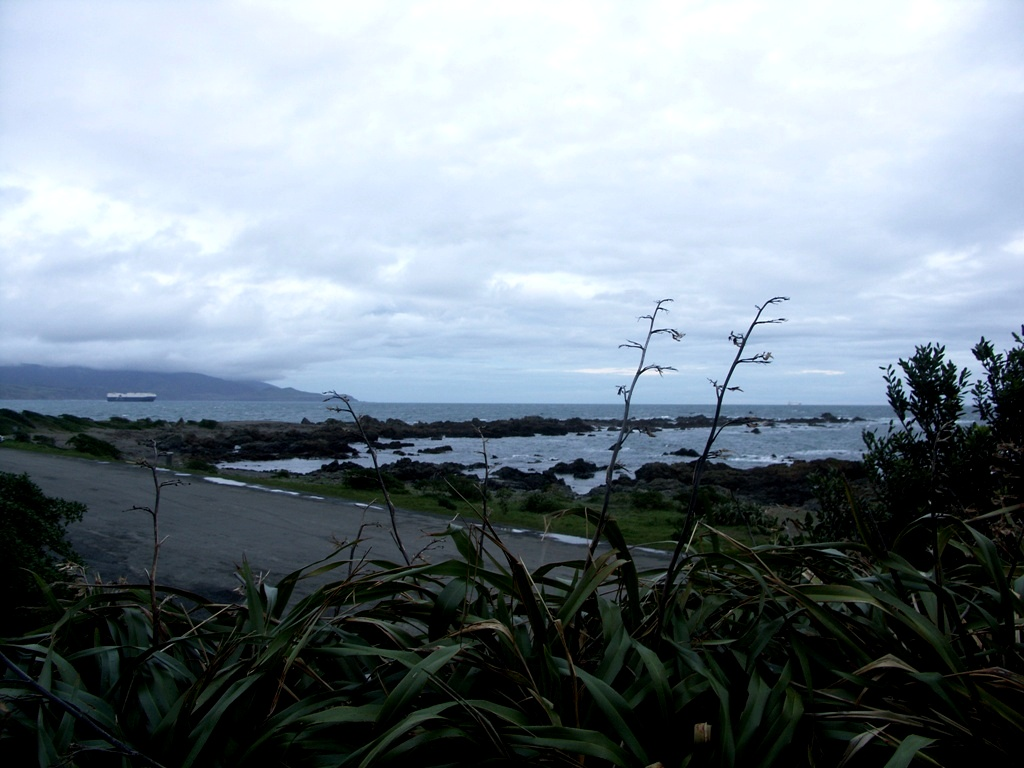
PrincessBay

== Location ==
It is situated between Houghton Bay and Te Raekaihau Point, on the rocky shores of the Cook Strait. It comprises a sandy beach that skirts Houghton Bay and contains a regular population of swimmers and divers.

== Character ==
Princess Bay is on the Southern Headlands Reserve, and along with other parts of Wellington's south coast, it is a popular recreational diving spot. The main beach is just inside the eastern boundary of the Taputeranga marine reserve, with areas further to the east outside the reserve, around to Sharks Tooth and Te Raekaihau, being popular for fishing and gathering of kaimoana. In 2005, the decommissioned F69 Frigate Wellington was sunk off Houghton Bay, and is now an artificial reef and dive location. Princess Bay has a long history as a favourite beach spot for Wellingtonians as one of the last places to catch the evening sun, and is an even smaller sister to neighbours Houghton and Lyall Bays.

Dogs are prohibited all year on Princess Bay beach. Neighbouring Houghton Bay beach is a dogs off-leash beach all year round. There is a small population of Kororā/Little Blue Penguins in the area.

== Aurora Australis ==
Displays of Aurora Australis are currently able to be seen from this locality, as the light pollution is shielded to some degree by the range of hills along the coastline.

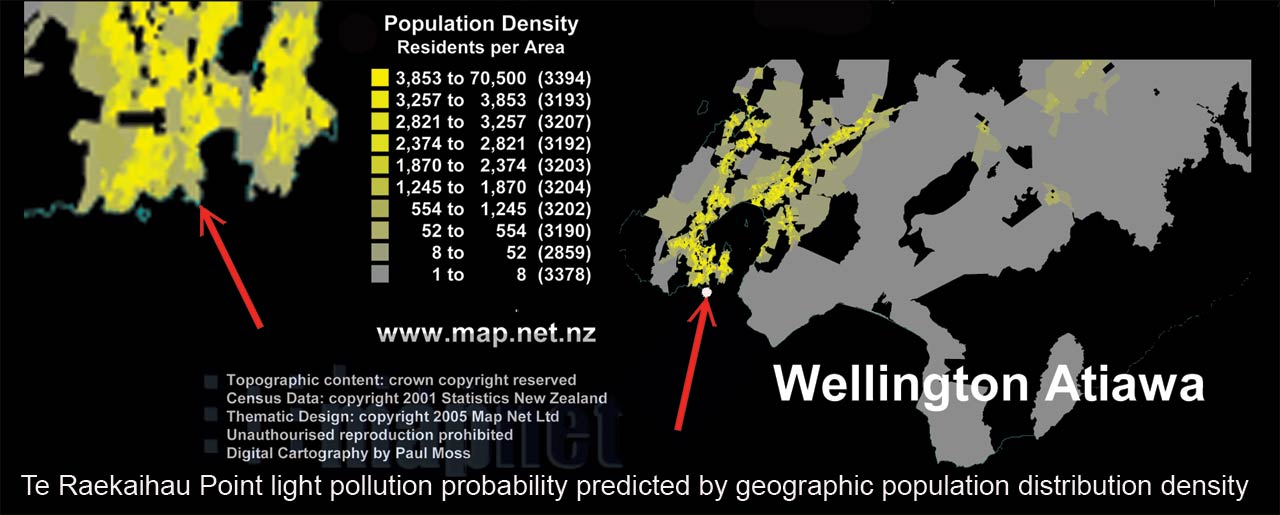
South Coast light pollution

The dark sky is necessary as most aurorae are weak and barely visible to the naked eye at this latitude, with any increase in light pollution removing such displays from visual identification.

== See also ==
- Te Raekaihau Point
- Lyall Bay
- Kaitiaki
