= Kae Miller =

New Zealand conservationist and activist (1910–1994)

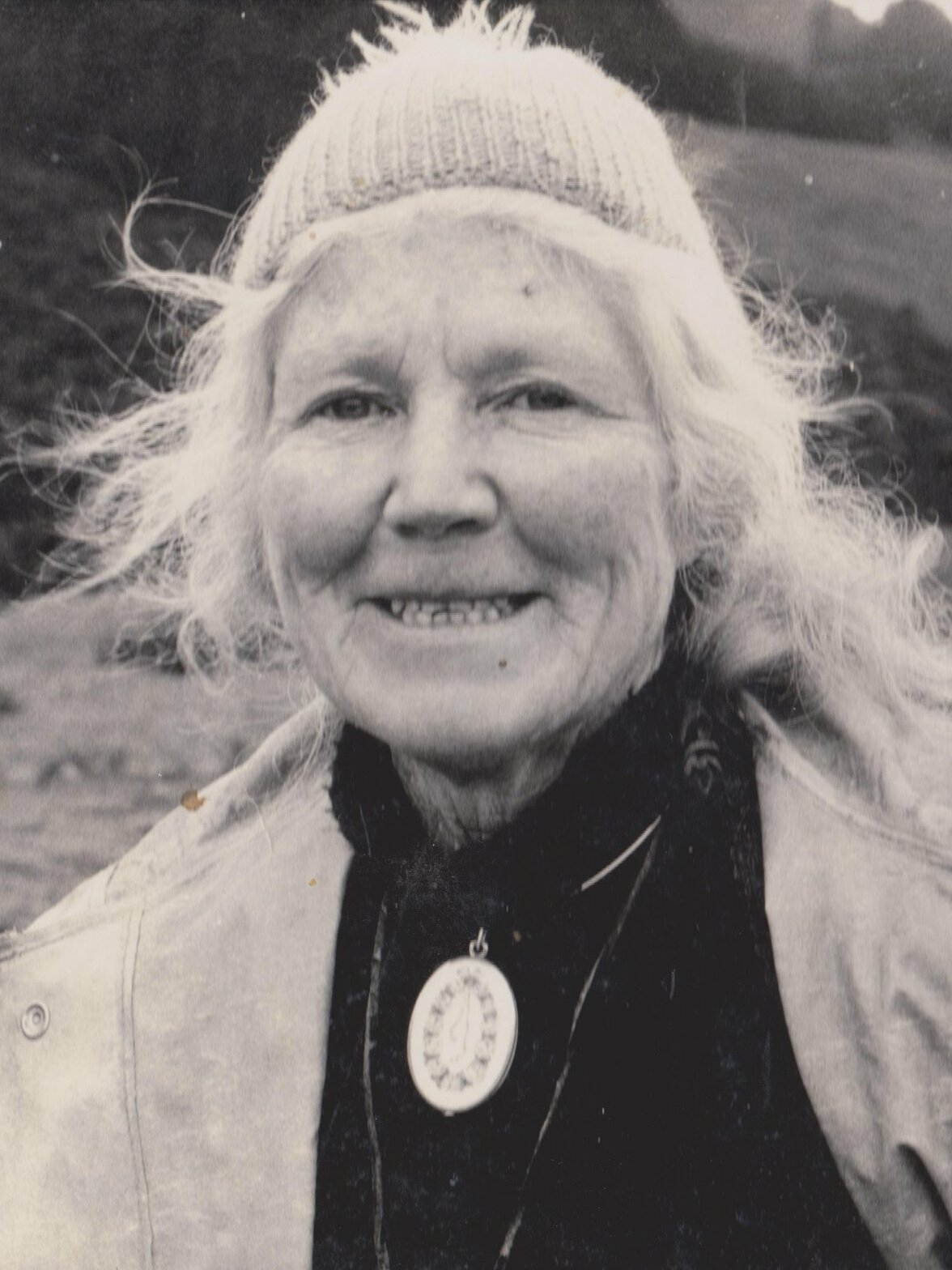
- Miller in the 1980s
- Born: Katrine Fearon Hursthouse; 30 December 1910; Wellington, New Zealand
- Died: 19 June 1994 (aged 83); Wellington, New Zealand
- Other names: Kae Hursthouse; Katrine Miller; K. F. Miller
- Occupations: Psychologist; environmental and mental health activist
- Years active: 1940s–1990s
- Known for: Creation of View Road Park and the Alice Krebs Lodge
- Relatives: Richmond Hursthouse (grandfather); Alfred Saunders (great-grandfather)

Kae Miller (also known as Kae Hursthouse, 30 December 1910 – 19 June 1994) was a New Zealand conservationist, mental health activist, and cooperative housing advocate. She grew up in the Wellington area, attending local schools. At the age of thirteen, she went abroad to study and attended a private girls' school in Hertfordshire, England. Returning to New Zealand, she earned a Bachelor of Science in 1932 from Victoria College and the following year completed a master's degree with honours from Massey College. Returning to England, Hursthouse obtained a teaching certificate with an emphasis on child psychology at the Institute of Education in London. After a brief marriage in 1936, she spent almost two years travelling, before returning to England to engage in support work during World War II. Having become a committed pacifist, between 1939 and 1942 she worked with a group to rescue Jews from Germany and served as a nurse's aid in the Civil Nursing Reserve and at two hospitals.

Returning to New Zealand in 1942, Miller worked at the Anglican Boys Home in Lower Hutt, worked as a child welfare officer, and ran a home for maladjusted children. She also gave radio lectures about child welfare. Back in England, from 1947 she spent several years working in children's homes until she again moved back to New Zealand in the early 1950s. Concerned for the well-being of people who struggled with mental illness, she created the Box Trust for Mental Health in 1969. Miller initiated a recycling scheme at the Porirua tip (or landfill) in 1977. She attempted to create an eco-friendly cooperative housing project on land she owned. Unable to secure approval from the Wellington City Council, in 1980 she changed her plans and founded the View Road Park Project Society. Through her efforts, the View Road Park and Reserve (Te Rae Kaihau Park) was developed to conserve the natural environment. The Alice Krebs Lodge was opened both as accommodation for caretakers managing the park and as a spiritual retreat.

== Early life and education ==
Katrine Fearon Hursthouse, known as "Kae", was born on 30 December 1910 in Wellington, New Zealand, to Rhoda (née Buchanan) and William Richmond Hursthouse. Her father was a dentist, but had recurring clinical depression. He studied dental surgery in England and then had a private practice in Wellington. Her maternal grandparents were Elizabeth (née Saunders), daughter of Alfred Saunders, a member of New Zealand's Parliament and supporter of women's suffrage, and J. E. Buchanan. Her paternal grandparents were Mary Fearon and Richmond Hursthouse, also at one time a member of parliament. She was raised with her younger sister Mary and a brother, William. (Note: William "Bill" Weldon Oliver Hursthouse was the son of Robert Henry Weldon Oliver, who died in service in 1915 and Kate Hursthouse, who died in 1920. He was adopted by his aunt and uncle after his mother's death.) In 1919, at the conclusion of her father's World War I service in the Royal New Zealand Dental Corps, the family joined him in Egypt for several months before going to England. After he spent a year completing dentistry studies at Guy's Hospital, they returned to New Zealand in August 1920. Hursthouse attended Samuel Marsden Collegiate School and then in 1923 went abroad with her mother, sister, and brother. Mary and William studied at a local lyceum in Paris for two years, while their mother studied languages at the Sorbonne. Kae enrolled at Abbot's Hill School in Hertfordshire, England, a girls' boarding school founded and headed by her godmother Katrine Baird.

In 1928, Hursthouse returned from England to New Zealand in September. She was severely injured in an accident in November, when the car she was riding in was struck by a train. She began studying botany and zoology at Victoria University of Wellington, and graduated in 1932 with a Bachelor of Science. Hursthouse then completed a master's degree with honours in 1933 from Massey College. She was back in England in 1934, studying for a teaching certificate and attending lectures on child psychology at the Institute of Education in London. In 1935, she participated in Empire Day celebrations by giving a talk on the League of Nations in Ealing at the junior branch of the League's Union. In the spring of 1936 in Wellington, she married Alexander "Lex" Miller, a Scottish, Presbyterian minister living in Auckland, who was the general secretary of the New Zealand Student Christian Movement. They separated soon after an August trip that year to San Francisco, California, as delegates for New Zealand to the World Student Christian Federation.

In December 1937, Hursthouse and her sister Mary travelled abroad from Australia to the south of France. From France, they journeyed on to Italy and arrived in London the following spring. There they visited their brother, William, who was working at Imperial Airways, and enjoyed the hospitality of an aunt. The sisters left England to spend the summer in Germany with plans to return to New Zealand on 3 December 1938. They were later joined by a cousin and a German-Jewish friend, Alice Krebs, and went to the Ore Mountains on the Czech border. Krebs, who became influential in Hursthouse's life, was a vegetarian and an advocate of foraging for natural foods, a skill she taught the group. Hursthouse remained in Germany when Mary returned to New Zealand. She travelled to Pomerania and stayed with Reinhold von Thadden, chair of the World Student Christian Federation and an adherent of the Confessing Church. Von Thadden opposed the Nazi regime, and stepped down from his post when the German state attempted to restrict membership of the organisation to Aryans.

== Career ==
=== War years (1938–1945) ===
Although at the beginning of the war Hursthouse was not a pacifist, her friend Laura Livingstone, who was involved in the peace movement, influenced her decision to become an activist in promoting peace. Bishop of Chichester George Bell sent Livingstone, who was his sister-in-law, to Berlin to work with the International Christian Committee for German Refugees. Constituted in London, the group worked with Heinrich Grüber's relief offices to assist Jews and non-Aryan Christians in leaving Germany. Hursthouse began working with Livingstone in Berlin, but they returned to England in early 1939 when the bishop advised the work to rescue Jews from Germany should continue from England because of war conditions. Her skill with languages – she was fluent in German and also spoke French and Russian – facilitated her work with refugees. She also worked as a nurse's aid in the Civil Nursing Reserve and at two hospitals. During this time, Hursthouse became engaged to Franz Baermann Steiner, a Czech émigré, who was an anthropologist and poet. He dedicated his poem "Läuterungen" ("Purifications") to her. Although the engagement was later called off, the two remained friends. Through her friendship with Steiner, she met Elias Canetti, who would later win the Nobel Prize in Literature, and his wife, Veza. To help the Canettis financially, she asked Elias to tutor her to improve her German.

In August 1941, Hursthouse's father died and her mother began pressing her to return to New Zealand. She left in May 1942, but remained in contact with the Canettis, facilitating their correspondence to each other and Elias' brother Georges in France. To get around the British censorship rules, the Canettis mailed letters to Hursthouse, who forwarded them from New Zealand until the end of the war. By July, she was engaged in an effort to raise funds to facilitate paying the expenses of refugee students who were attending Canterbury University College. Hursthouse continued to work for peace, often speaking from a soapbox and debating the importance of pacifism. She secured a post on the staff of the Anglican Boys Home in Lower Hutt and began lecturing on the radio about child welfare. In 1945, Hursthouse established a Saturday school for five- to nine-year-old children which taught handicrafts and painting, and allowed children to play games or to participate in picnics, puppet shows, and swimming.

=== Post-war period (1947–1966) ===
In December 1947, Hursthouse returned to London. She discovered that Krebs was living there, having survived the war and her internment at the Theresienstadt concentration camp. In spring 1948, Hursthouse's daughter, Felicity, was born in London, and at the end of the year, her mother died. She worked in several children's homes in England, while living in Camden Town. In the early 1950s, she returned to New Zealand and reverted to her married name. She spent the next several years managing properties she had inherited from her mother and returned to studies to further her education. In 1966, she completed a master's thesis entitled, Kant, Canetti, and the Psychopaths: Doubts Compared at Victoria University of Wellington.

=== New Zealand activism (1969–1994) ===
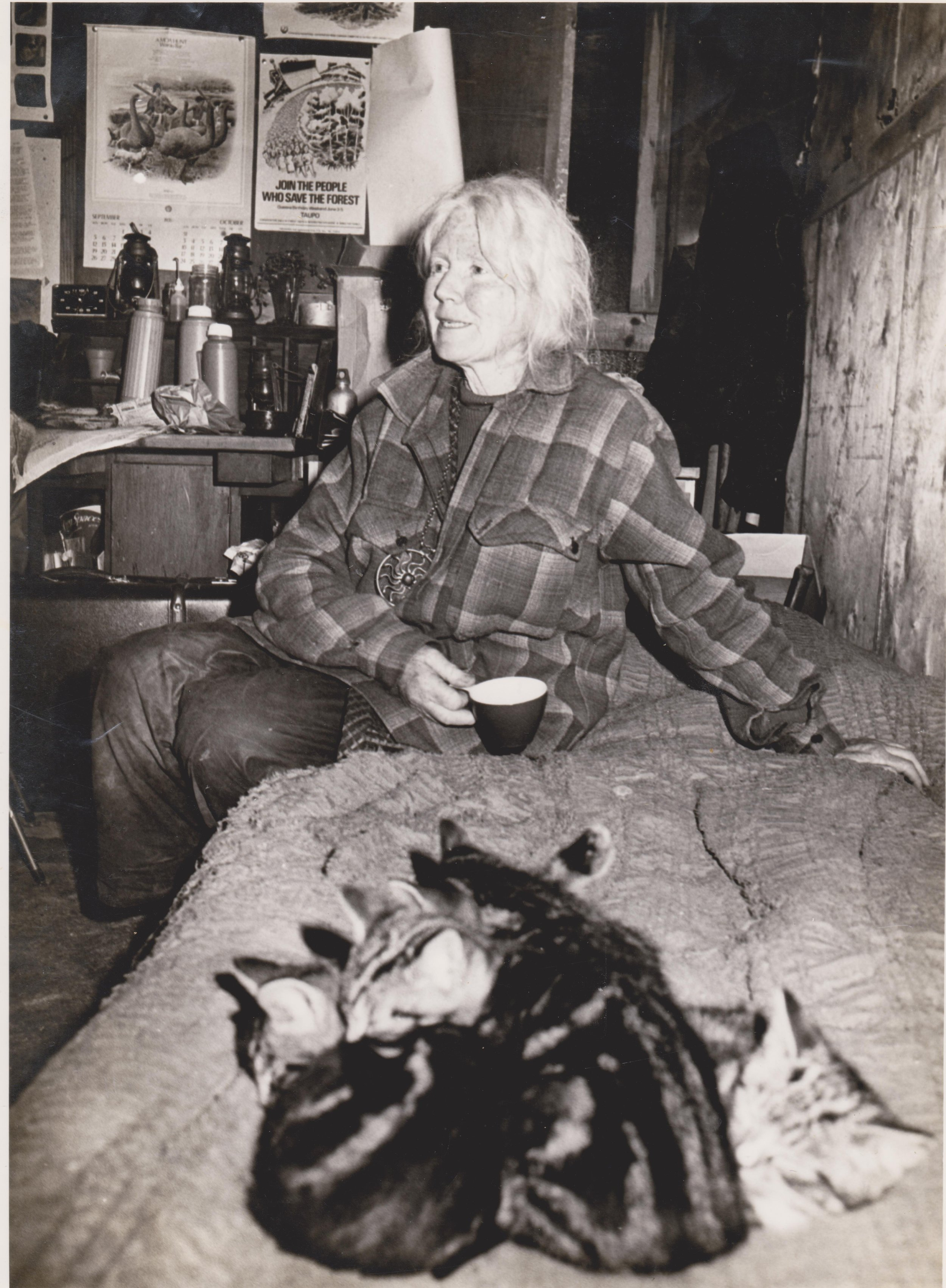
Miller at the Porirua landfill lodge.

Miller had a life-long interest in mental health and the care of persons with mental illness. In 1969, she registered a charity, the Box Trust for Mental Health, which was funded from the revenues of property she owned. In the early 1970s, she became involved with the Action for the Environment group and quickly began advocating for conservation, responsible management of development projects, and preservation of natural habitats. Becoming aware of landfill waste, she began a recycling push to clean up what locals called rubbish tips. In 1977, at the Porirua landfill, she built a lodge, which she called the Alice Krebs Lodge, out of salvaged packing crates and other materials. She lived in the lodge for two years before the Porirua City Council made her vacate the premises. She worked with environmentalists and former psychiatric patients to find and repair recyclable objects in the landfill so that they could be resold. The group was able to raise about $100 per month by reclaiming bottles and paper. She also gave tours of bush reserves to raise awareness about the importance of maintaining green spaces.

During this same time, Miller was committed to creating cooperative housing as a refuge for people with mental illnesses. As she had struggled with depression herself, Miller wanted to establish a natural sanctuary where people could recuperate and relax. She owned property on Mount Kaukau and developed plans to build five homes for this purpose on Simla Crescent in Khandallah. She formed the Collaborative Housing Society in the 1970s and applied numerous times for a permit to develop the properties. The government was unfavourable to cooperative housing at the time and neighbours opposed the development, fearing problems with the proposed residents. Miller owned other properties in Christchurch and Kelburn. In 1980, she sold the Kelburn property with the intent of using the proceeds to establish a housing cooperative. In 1988, the Wellington City Council rejected the housing proposal but allowed the area to be rezoned to prevent development.

In 1980, the Collaborative Housing Society reorganized as the View Road Park Society and began working on development of a park. This organisation lent money to develop the View Road South Headland Reserve, aiming to create a nature preserve, recreational green space, and sanctuary for recovery from mental illness. In 1981, the View Road Park Society secured approval from the Wellington City Council to establish a park on 9.3 hectares of land located on a ridge overlooking Houghton Bay on one side and Lyall Bay on the other. The city leased the property at peppercorn rental rates to the society for a ten-year term. At the time the reserve was acquired, it was overgrown with gorse. Miller focused on planting trees and native plants and bushes on the site. Though the lease expired in 1991, the Wellington City Council has allowed a month by month rental to continue.

In 1985, Miller built a small house on the site of the park, which she named the Alice Krebs Lodge. The structure was built in the traditional kiwi bach holiday home style. The thirty square metre building is made of timber and supported by timber pilings because of the steep grade of the site. It is a utilitarian cottage with few amenities, although it is connected to the city's electrical, sewage, and water systems. The interior contains a bathroom, bedroom, kitchen alcove, and living room. Miller lived in the structure until 1990 and since she vacated it, it has primarily been used as a seasonal residence for caretakers of the park, or a retreat for those seeking mental and physical solace.

== Death and legacy ==
Miller died on 19 June 1994 in Wellington and her funeral followed on 23 June from the St Peter's Church on Willis Street. At her death, she was remembered as one of the leaders of New Zealand's conservation movement and as a staunch advocate of promoting peace, cooperative housing, and care for people with mental illnesses. In 2007, the Kae Miller Trust was established by the Te Rae Kaihau Restoration Group to honour Miller's work in founding the reserve and continue her protection of the environment there. In both 2002 and 2009, the Wellington City Council proposed changing the designation of the site from a recreational reserve to a type B scenic reserve to give greater protection to its unique coastal environment and cultural heritage value. The Te Rae Kaihau Restoration Group established a care-taking plan for the reserve in 2010 with a five-year model for monitoring, restoration, and review of the site.
