= Te Raekaihau Point =

Coastal landform in New Zealand

- Marine rock formation
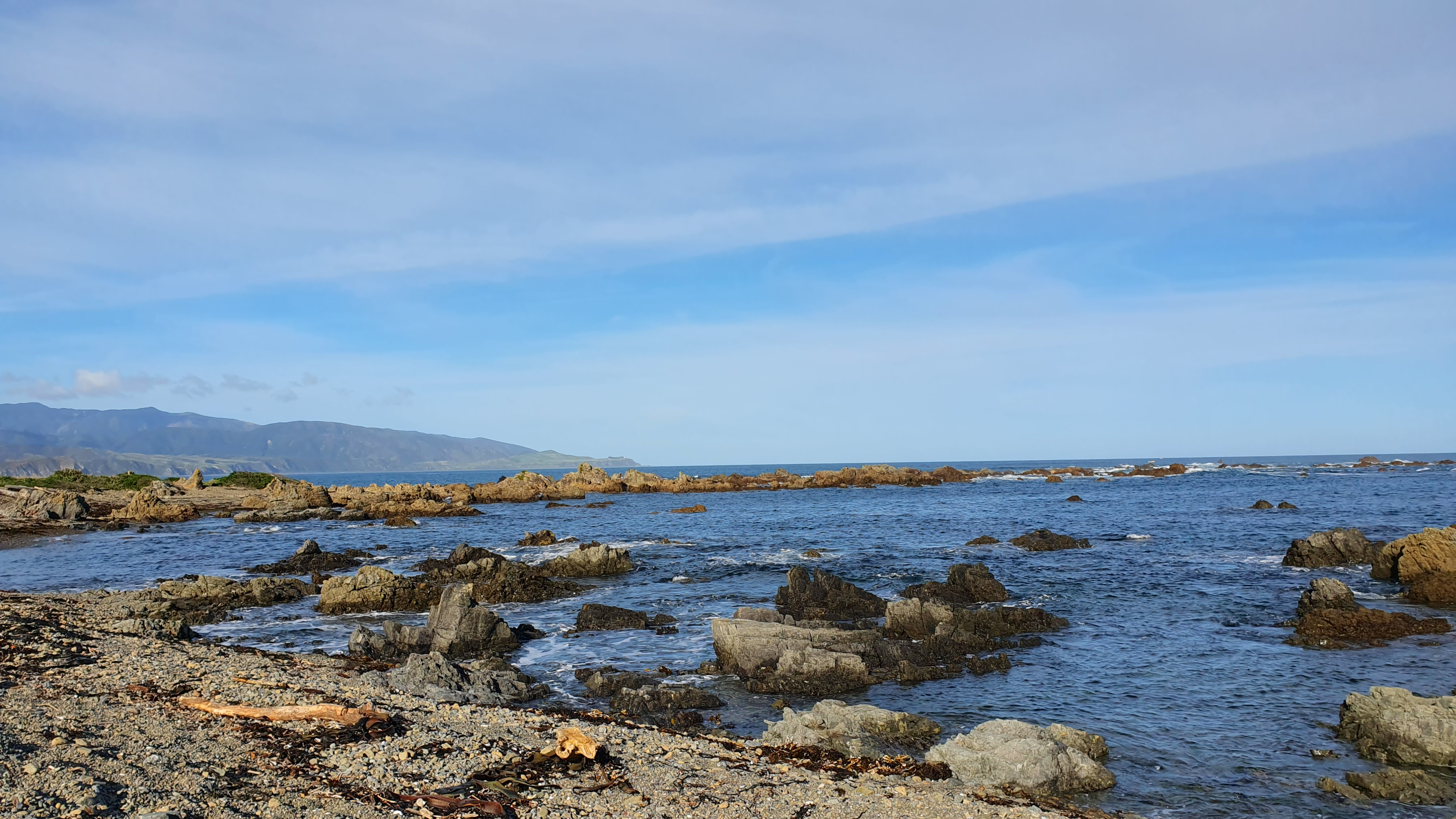
- Te Raekaihau Point, looking east
- Interactive map of Te Raekaihau Point
- Coordinates: 41°20′44″S 174°47′26″E
- Location: Wellington

Te Raekaihau Point is a rugged coastal landform in Wellington, New Zealand, adjacent to Princess Bay, between Houghton Bay to the west and Lyall Bay to the east on the south coast. One meaning of the name is "the headland that eats the wind".

Te Raekaihau Point is part of the View Road South Headlands Reserve and remains an undeveloped interface with Cook Strait and one of the few undeveloped coastal places within Wellington city. The point is used for diving, walking, scenic photography, picnics, eco-tourism, nature study, and astronomy. The point is relatively free of light pollution, with little nearby population and no street lighting. The lessened light pollution means that Aurora Australis displays are sometimes visible to the south over Cook Strait.

The site was the centre of major controversy in the 2000s when a non-profit developer proposed building an educational and tourist aquarium building on the site. Since the proposal was denied, rehabilitation of the environment at the point has been undertaken.

In 2025, Wellington City proposed to classify the coastline around the point as a 'Recreation Reserve', reflecting "the dominant use of the shoreline for informal public enjoyment and the need to manage access and provision of facilities while also protecting the ecological, cultural and landscape values".

== Setting ==
The site can be reached through Island Bay, Houghton Bay via Melrose, or Lyall Bay. Queen's Drive, a road around the coast, passes around Te Raekaihau Poiint at the base of the bluff on the headland.

The headland has been eroded over time by wind and rough seas, forming a reef extending out from the existing headland. The reef was raised 1.5 metres during the 1855 Wairarapa earthquake and a large marine platform now exists above the water line. Gravel and stones wash ashore in rough seas, and the spit at the end of the land catches flotsam including kelp and driftwood. The original landform has been altered by gravel removal, rubbish dumping and compaction of soil by vehicles.

=== View Road South Headland Reserve ===
Te Raekaihau Point is part of the View Road South Headland Reserve, also known as Te Raekaihau Park. The reserve covers 21.6 ha on top of the headland from View Road South and down to the shoreline. Most of the headland is owned by Wellington City Council, while a few areas around the border of the reserve are privately owned. In 1981, environmentalist Kae Miller formed a group to look after the reserve, and from 1985 she lived in a small house she built on the reserve. Volunteers continued her work after she left the area, clearing tracks and native plant habitats on the headland. Tracks on the reserve are accessed from View Road.

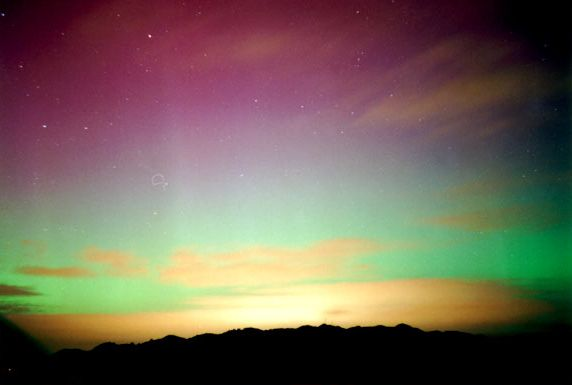
Aurora Australis latitude 41 degrees south

== History ==
The south coast was a valuable source of gravel from the early 20th century until the 1960s. For example, in 1929, beach gravel and boulders were taken from Te Raekaihau Point to a quarry in Townsend Road, Miramar. In May 1931, a formal permit was issued that allowed the City Council to remove shingle and sand from below the high-water line all along the coast between Princess Bay and Arthur's Nose at the western end of Lyall Bay, including Te Raekaihau Point. The city engineer noted that the council had already taken material from the land in this area in the past. Shortly after the permit was issued, the question of sand removal at Princess Bay was raised at a City Council meeting: "So much sand has been taken out of this bay that it has been changed from a beautiful picnic resort to a positive death-trap for kiddies and picnickers," said Councillor Semple in referring to Princess Pay. Great big holes had been dug and the landscape destroyed, ruining the place as a resort and making it decidedly unsafe." A shingle plant existed on the seaward side of Te Raekaihau Point in the 1930s.

Te Raekaihau Point and the adjacent Princess Bay are very popular recreational spots. After fifty years of campaigning by local residents' associations, public toilets were built at the Princess Bay end of Te Raekaihau Point in 1991.

=== Marine centre dispute ===
Between 1996 and 2003, over 160,000 people visited the Island Bay Marine Education Centre which operated from a former bait shed at Island Bay. In 1998, operators of the existing centre suggested building a purpose-built aquarium. They formed the Wellington Marine Conservation Trust with the aim of expanding their operation, and in 2006 finalised a proposal for a three-storey educational and tourist complex and aquarium at Te Raekaihau Point, to be known as the 'Aquarium of New Zealand', unrelated to the National Aquarium of New Zealand in Napier, Hawkes Bay. The design by Ian Athfield was for a three-storey building which would include large aquarium tanks, offices and workrooms, a reception area and a café seating 155 people. The project, which included 92 car parks, would cover 1.3 ha at the point and cost around $20 million. The Trust aimed to showcase the South Coast, provide education programmes about conserving the unique coastal features of New Zealand, partner with organisations for marine research and tourism purposes, and provide a base for "long term protection and enjoyment" of Wellington's marine resources. The land at Te Raekaihau Point was owned by Wellington City Council, which supported the project in principle and provided backing for the concept in the form of substantial interest-free loans and grants for resource consent applications. The Department of Conservation and iwi represented by Ngātata Love also supported the project. Pro-development businessmen such as Infratil chairman Lloyd Morrison and former mayor Mark Blumsky donated funds in support of the project.

Widespread opposition from throughout Wellington had sprung up, and the groups Save The Point Inc and GADOT (Group Against Development on Te Rae Kai Hau Point Incorporated) formed to fight the development. Some people believed that the centre would be better sited in a place with an established tourism, parking, and convenience infrastructure. Many Wellington ratepayers believed that the $20 million cost of the Marine Education Centre was excessive, that the potential benefits were not worth the risk, and that the Council-supported Centre would not be economically self-sustainable and thus increase Wellington City Council's public debt. Local amateur astronomers in the Wellington region, who find the point favourable for watching for aurorae, were also concerned that the existence of the centre, including a proposed late-night café and lighted parking lot, might compromise the relatively unpolluted night skies of the area. Residents were also concerned about loss of access to the point. Feelings ran high. Some supporters of the aquarium said their names had been added to a petition opposing the project without their consent. Bruce Stewart's truck displaying an anti-development message was damaged. The not-for-profit organisations opposing the development ran various fundraising events to offset considerable costs.

The initial hearing for resource consent for the centre drew nearly 1550 submissions. Weeks of discussion concluded at the beginning of April 2006 but the commissioners failed to reach a decision. The process was restarted with new submissions being sought, and a strongly fought opposition by community members. Almost 10,000 submissions were received in the second round, with about half being in favour of the plan and half against. Wellington City Council granted resource consents in October 2006.

In September 2007, the Environment Court ruled against the developers, with the conclusion that Te Raekaihau Point was most important as a wild and undeveloped aspect of the landscape. The ruling declared that a tourist aquarium development "would compromise the area's open space values and result in significant adverse effects on the landscape".

Rongotai MP Annette King, who had backed the proposal, said another site would have to be considered. In March 2008, the Marine Conservation Trust announced that it would look at building the aquarium at the Maranui Depot, a former council quarry and site for road-building equipment at the western end of Lyall Bay. As of July 2025 no work had happened.

=== Rehabilitation 2010 – 2014 ===
In 2009 Wellington City Council commissioned a report for a plan to rehabilitate Te Raekaihau Point. Noting problems at the site – weeds and pest animals, trampling of native plants, compaction of the ground by vehicles driving over it, sand movement and the possibility of storm surge and sea level rise – the plan proposed rehabilitation of the site over the next five years by a variety of means. Weeds would be removed and some new plants established, car parking would be restricted and a pedestrian walkway created so that people were less likely to walk over plants. Work began in April 2010 and was expected to cost $350,000, mostly funded from the Plimmer Bequest. The report acknowledged that "one of the more popular pastimes for visitors to this part of the south coast, at any time of the year, is viewing the seascape from one’s car", so removal of carparking was not popular with some members of the public.

=== 2025 clean up ===
After being alerted by a member of the public that there was asbestos at the point, Wellington City Council investigated in July 2022 and August 2023. Traces of asbestos, oil, heavy metals, zinc, arsenic and lead were found, the result of waste dumping in the 1950s or 1960s. Although the risk to human health was low, the point is susceptible to storm surges which could uncover or spread waste material. In May 2025, 2,200 tonnes of waste was dug up and removed to the city landfill. Native skinks and geckos at the site were relocated as part of the works. The remediation cost almost $1 million, half of which was paid for by the government's 'Contaminated Sites and Vulnerable Landfills Fund'.

== Ecology ==
A 2006 survey of plant life common at the point and surrounds found taupata, thick-leaved mahoe, Muehlenbeckia complexa (pohuehue or wire vine), Tetragonia implexicoma, Asplenium appendiculatum subsp. maritimum, Pyrrosia eleagnifolia (ota or leather-leaf fern), silver tussock, Spinifex sericeus, Carex pumila (sand sedge), Ficinia nodosa (wiwi or knobby clubrush), Phormium cookianum (wharariko or coastal flax), Triglochin striatum, Senecio lautus ssp. lautus (shore groundsel), Apium prostratum, Crassula sieberiana Dichondra repens (Mercury Bay weed), horokaka or New Zealand iceplant, Einadia triandra and Sarcocornia quinqueflora (glasswort). The landward side of the point had the most varied vegetation, while taupata was the most common plant on the windswept and rocky seaward side. Plants identified as unwanted weeds in 2009 included boneseed, karo, pōhutukawa, marram grass, sea couch grass (Elytrigia pycnantha), cape ivy (Senecio mikanoides) and lupin. A rehabilition plan aimed to remove theses species where possible.

In 2009 little blue penguins were known to nest at the north of the site. Other seabirds including white-fronted terns, reef herons, shags, red- and black-billed gulls and black-backed gulls visited the area but did not breed there. Rabbits and rats were known to live at the point.

The rare Smeagol slug lives in gravel beds at the point.

== Gallery ==
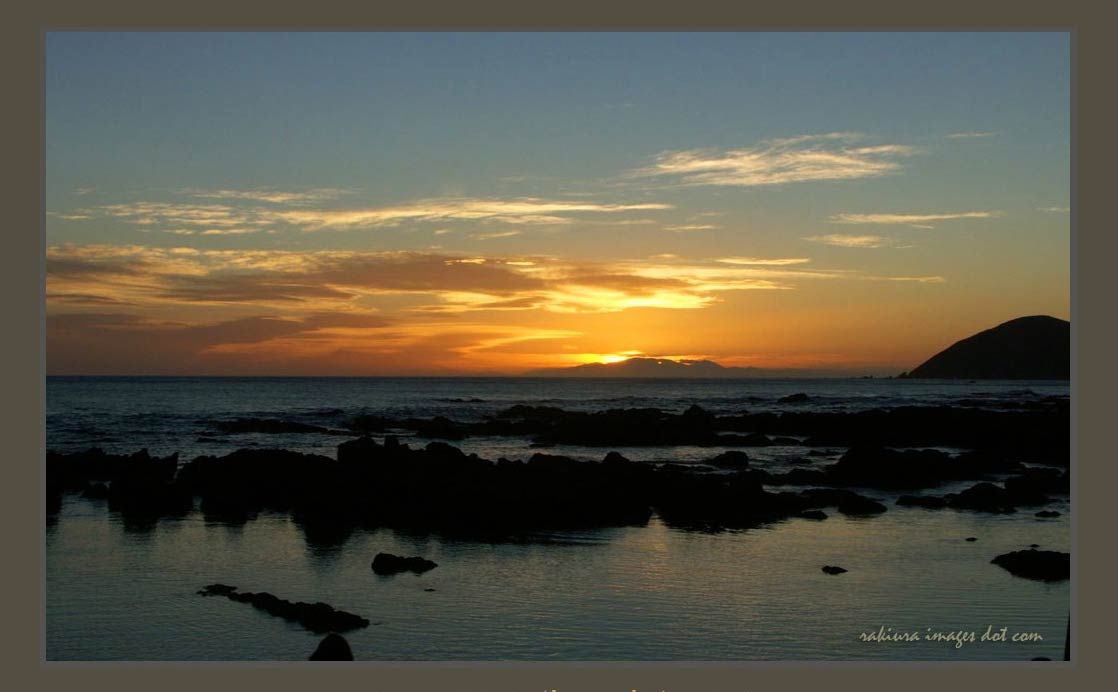
Te Raekaihau at sunset

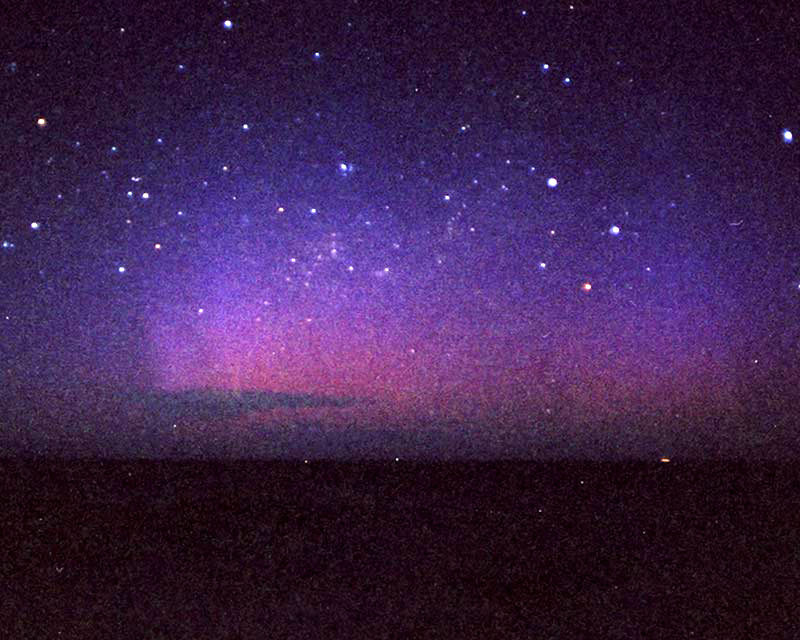
Aurora Australis from Wellington's south coast

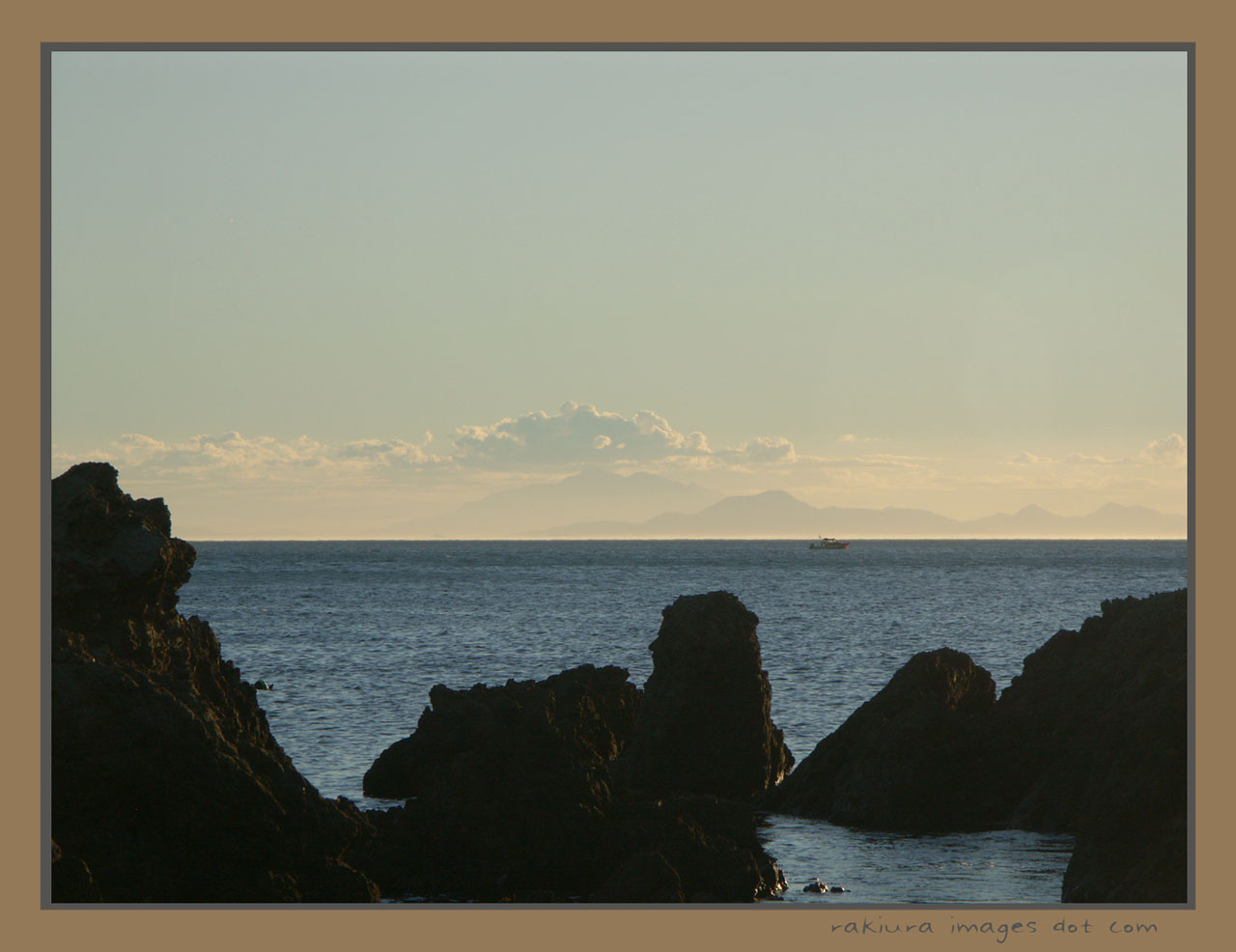
Te Raekaihau Point rock pools, looking toward the mountains of the South Island
