= Clare Athfield =

New Zealand interior designer

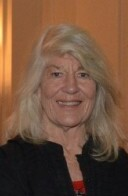
- Clare Athfield in 2015
- Born: Nancy Clare Cookson; New Zealand
- Occupation: Interior designer
- Spouse: Ian Athfield

Nancy Clare Athfield (née Cookson) is a retired New Zealand interior designer. She was influential in using New Zealand place names to name the colours of paint for buildings. Her design input was seen in decorative motifs on architecture projects of Athfield Architects amongst other places.

== Biography ==
Athfield is from Northland, New Zealand. She went to Auckland Teachers' College and trained as an art teacher graduating in 1959. She taught art in Auckland and worked at the Auckland Art Gallery in the late 1950s. In 1964 she moved to Wellington, and in 1971 she began working in her husband's architectural firm, Athfield Architects. She established the firm's interiors division, provided interior design advice and also collaborated with artists as and when needed.

Athfield influenced the colours and names of paints used in New Zealand, developing limewashes for Aalto Paints and contributing her 'knowledge of the effects of colour and light on spatial quality and materials to both Dulux and Resene paint ranges'. Athfield started the idea of using New Zealand place names for paint colour names.

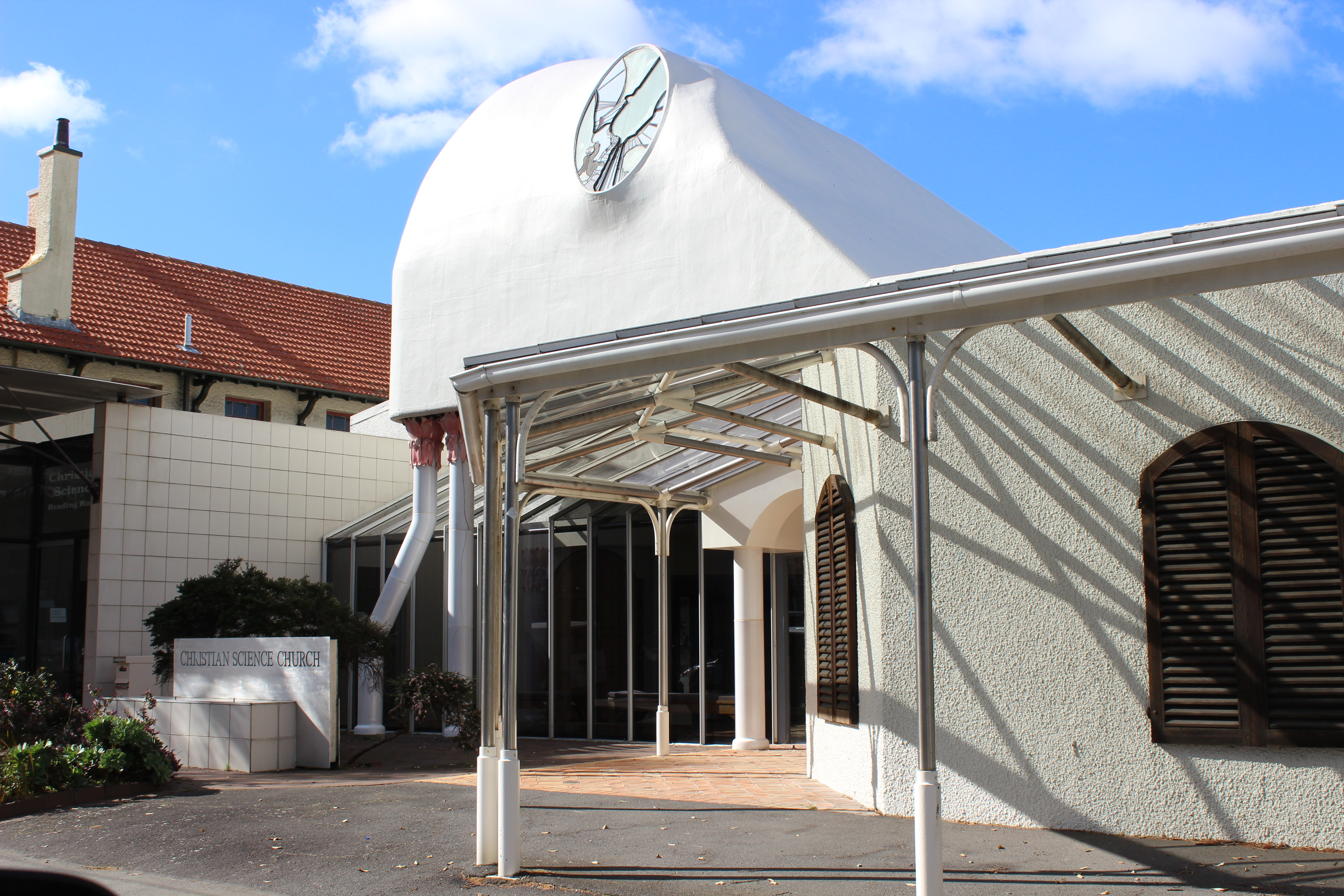
First Church of Christ Scientist, Willis Street, Wellington

Athfield contributed to the design of the First Church of Christ Scientist in Wellington, built in the 1980s, commissioning the ornate ceramic capitals for the church. Athfield designed the pink and white petals and worked with Neville Porteous who hand-made each tile. When the building was demolished in 2022, parts of the capitals were retrieved and exhibited.

In 1977, Athfield Architects began designing Crown House, in Wellington. Athfield designed and made the clay rams' heads seen on the keystones on the windows.

== Projects ==
=== With Athfield Architects ===
- Sindall House, Lower Hutt (1971-1976)
- Oriental Bay Apartments, Wellington
- First Church of Christ Scientist, Christchurch (1980-1983)
- Crown House, Wellington (1977-1981)

== Personal life ==
Athfield married architect Ian Athfield in Kawakawa on 22 December 1962. The couple had two sons. Their family home built in the 1960s is one of New Zealand's most iconic modernist pieces of architecture, winning in 2019 the New Zealand Institute of Architects Enduring Architecture award.

In 2014, Ian Athfield was made a Knight Companion of the New Zealand Order of Merit. As his wife, Athfield may use the courtesy title Clare, Lady Athfield or Lady Athfield.
