= Ian Athfield =

New Zealand architect

Sir Ian Athfield KNZM
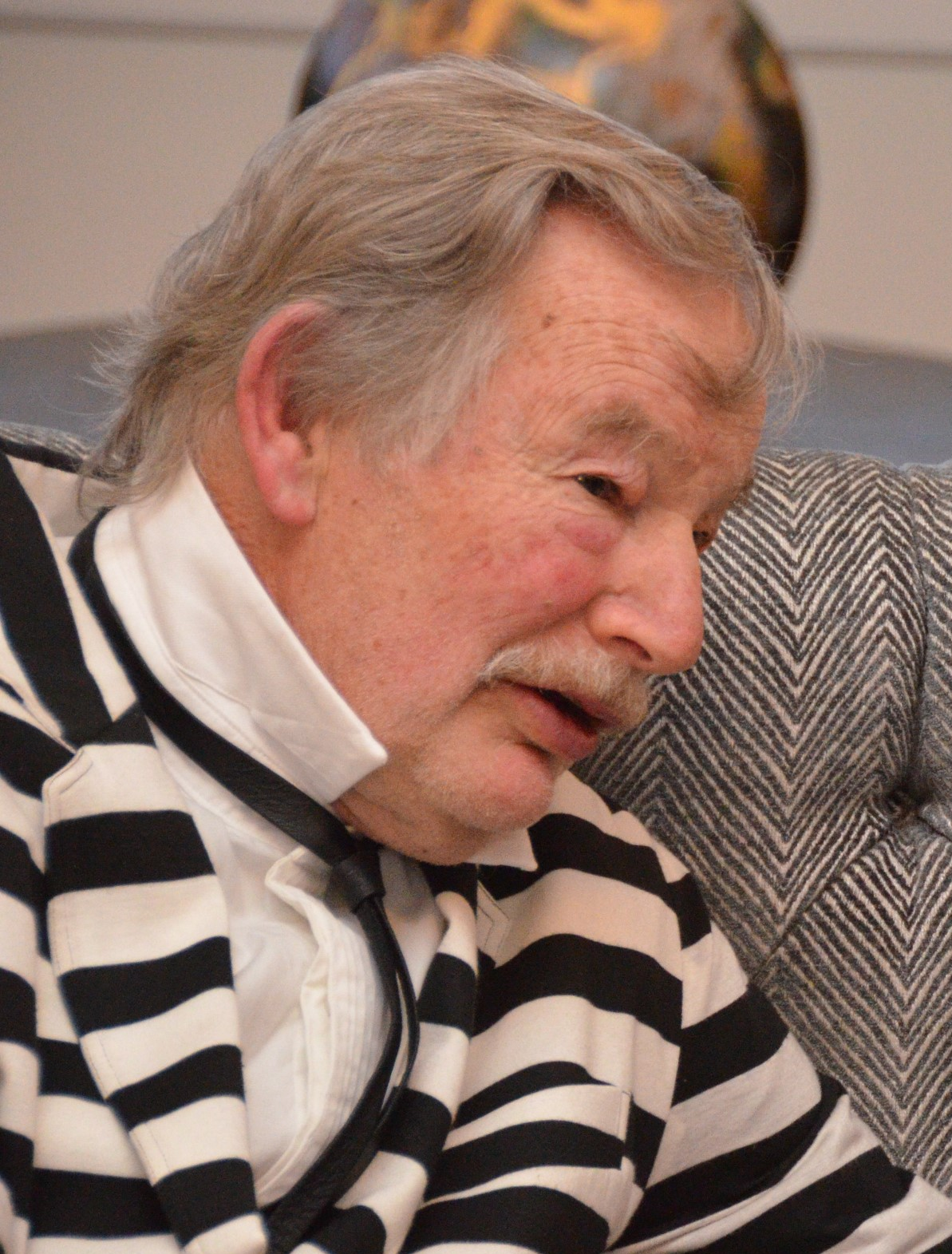
- Athfield in 2013
- Born: 15 July 1940; Christchurch, New Zealand
- Died: 16 January 2015 (aged 74); Wellington, New Zealand
- Education: University of Auckland
- Occupation: Architect
- Practice: Athfield Architects

Sir Ian Charles Athfield (known as Ath) KNZM (15 July 1940 – 16 January 2015) was a New Zealand architect who designed distinctive and innovative houses that challenged suburban norms, as well as celebrated commercial, public and institutional projects. He was born in Christchurch and graduated from the University of Auckland in 1963 with a Diploma of Architecture. That same year he joined Structon Group Architects, and he became a partner in 1965. In 1968 he was a principal partner in setting up Athfield Architects with Ian Dickson and Graeme John Boucher.

== Projects ==
A documentary 'Architect Athfield' (1979), which examines the frustrations and achievements of one of New Zealand's most lively and innovative architects.

In 1965 Athfield started work on his first major project, Athfield House, for his family and a studio. Located in Khandallah, Wellington, this distinctive group of structures stands out amongst neighbouring conventional suburban houses. His early projects were constructed with a broad palette of materials including corrugated iron, plaster, stainless steel and fibre glass. As a reaction to much of the bland "Modern" architecture of the period, Athfield built in a deliberately vernacular style using features harking back to colonial buildings. His designs incorporated finials, steeply pitched roofs, timber weatherboards, verandahs and double hung windows. He was also inspired by the architecture of the Greek Islands with their exterior envelopes of continuous plaster and small windows. Conversely, he also much admired the buildings of Mies van der Rohe with their precise and refined detailing of industrial materials.

Yet another area of influence for Athfield was the geometric massing of the Japanese Metabolists. Athfield combined all these disparate elements into a highly eclectic and personal style. During the 1970s Athfield built and renovated numerous domestic houses and buildings, developing a distinctive and highly personal design approach based on the repetition of small scale elements and complex massing. Critical opposition to these 'cartoon houses' did not bother him. Another criticism of Athfield's houses were that they were built for charm and not practicality. Athfield believed, however, that "in a house, you should get a surprise every time you turn a corner and look up".

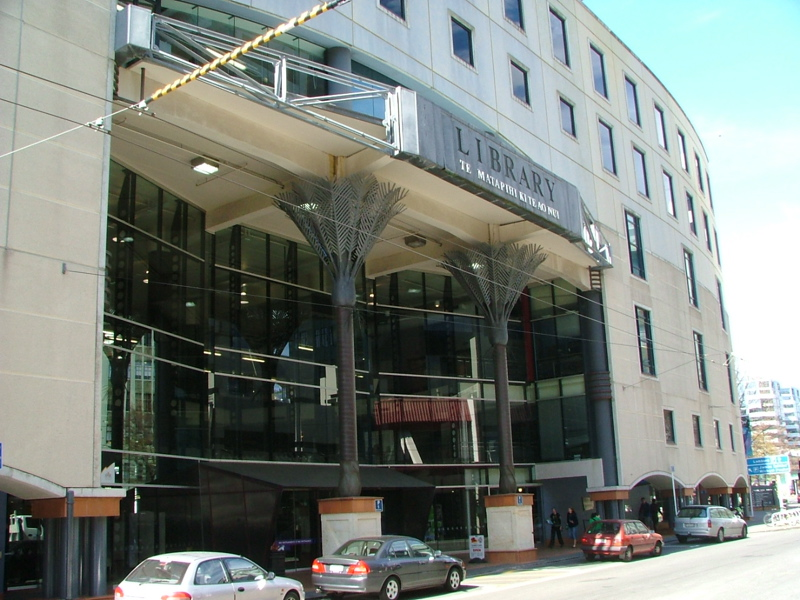
Wellington City Library

Athfield's practice expanded during the 1980s from mainly residential work to a wider variety of community and commercial buildings. As well as continuing to work on small-scale projects, his portfolio includes churches, pubs, council flats, stadiums and commercial high-rise buildings. Athfield's best known works include Telecom Towers, Civic Square and Wellington Central Library, Jade Stadium in Christchurch and work on the design of the Bangkok rapid transport system.

He was a President of the New Zealand Institute of Architects, judged many design competitions and was a keynote speaker at many overseas conferences. His firm's later projects included Chews Lane Precinct, the Wellington Overseas Passenger Terminal redevelopment and the Wellington Marine Education Centre.

A documentary on Athfield, Architect of Dreams, was produced for the NZ Documentary Festival.

Following the Canterbury earthquakes of 2010 and 2011, Athfield was appointed as an Architectural Ambassador to Christchurch. In 2012, architectural historian Julia Gatley published a book called Athfield Architects, about Athfield and his firm, following an exhibition she curated at the City Gallery Wellington.

== Awards and honours ==
Athfield won over 60 national and international architecture and design awards. In 1976 he won first prize in the International Competition for the Urban Environment of Developing Countries. In 1978 he was placed first equal in a Low Cost Housing Design Competition in Fiji. He won 13 NZIA Supreme Awards for his outstanding architectural projects. In 2004 he won the New Zealand Institute of Architects' highest honour, the Gold Medal. Athfield was the first New Zealand architect to register as an APEC architect.

Athfield was awarded the New Zealand 1990 Commemoration Medal. In the 1996 Queen's Birthday Honours, he was appointed a Companion of the New Zealand Order of Merit, for services to architecture, and in the 2015 New Year Honours he was promoted to Knight Companion of the same order.

He received a Distinguished Alumni Award in 1997 from the University of Auckland, and in 2000 he was awarded an honorary LitD by Victoria University of Wellington. Accepting his honorary doctorate on 18 April, Athfield stated:

I accept this on behalf of architects, designers, plumbers and gas fitters. We have suffered at the hands of accountants and engineers for too long. (Ian Athfield, 2000)

== Leaks ==
Some of Athfield's buildings have had weathertightness issues. These include St Paul's, a four-building apartment complex in Mulgrave Street, completed in 1999. In 2012, the chairman of the apartment block's body corporate said that the complex "leaked all over the place". Roofs needed to be repaired because the gutters were so flat that water ponded in them. When water overflowed the gutters, it went into the building. In addition, there was corrosion around windows and incorrectly installed concrete walls that leaked. Staircases had to be reclad at a cost of more than $1 million, and the total to permanently repair all the faults in the complex was estimated to be $20 million.

At Eastern Hutt School, five Ian Athfield-designed leaky buildings completed in 1996 cost over $300,000 to repair, and an award-winning home in Roseneath designed by Athfield in the 1970s was renovated in 2021 after " suffering from leaks and lacking insulation".

== Personal life ==
Athfield married Clare Cookson in Kawakawa on 22 December 1962. They had two sons. Clare, an interior designer, played an important role in many projects at Athfield Architects and her work was a significant reason for the firm's success. Athfield died in 2015 at Wellington Hospital, where he was being treated for prostate cancer. Complications from a routine procedure resulted in pneumonia.

== Notable works ==
- Athfield House, Wellington (begun 1968)
- Arlington Council Flats, Wellington (1970) (demolished 2021)
- Logan House (1974–75)
- Cox House, Wellington (1975)
- Manila, Philippines, housing project competition (1975–76)
- Young House (1978)
- Porteous House (1979)
- Buck House, Te Mata Estate, Hawkes Bay (1980)
- First Church of Christ Science, Wellington (1982–83)
- Moore Wilson's facade, Wellington (1984)
- Logical CSI House, Wellington (1986–87)
- 226 Oriental Parade, Wellington (1988)
- Telecom on Manners Street, Wellington (1988)
- Wellington Central Library, Wellington (1991)
- Civic Square, Wellington (1992)
- Extensions to Student Union building, Victoria University of Wellington (1992)
- Palmerston North City Library extensions (1997)
- Sam Neill House, Queenstown (1998)
- Rooftop additions to Te Puni Kōkiri House, Wellington (1998–99)
- Adam Art Gallery, Victoria University of Wellington (1999)
- Alan Duff House (2000)
- St Pauls Apartments, Wellington (2000)
- Lancaster Park extensions, Christchurch (with Architectus, 2002)
- Odlins Building/NZX refurbishment, Wellington (2005)
- TheNewDowse Museum, Lower Hutt, Wellington (2006)
- Chews Lane Precinct, Wellington (2009)
- Taranaki Street Wharf, Wellington (begun 2006)
- Selwyn District Council offices, Canterbury (2007)
- Pipitea House, Wellington (2011; headquarters of the GCSB)
- Wellington Marine Education Centre (proposed, denied by the Environment Court in 2007 on appeal; new location proposed)
- 1–8 Clyde Quay Wharf (officially opened on Wednesday, 18 June 2014), Wellington – formerly the Overseas Passenger Terminal
- Tommy Millions pizza kiosk on Courtenay Place, Wellington
- Kate Sheppard Exchange, Wellington (proposed)
- 109 Featherston Street, Wellington (proposed)
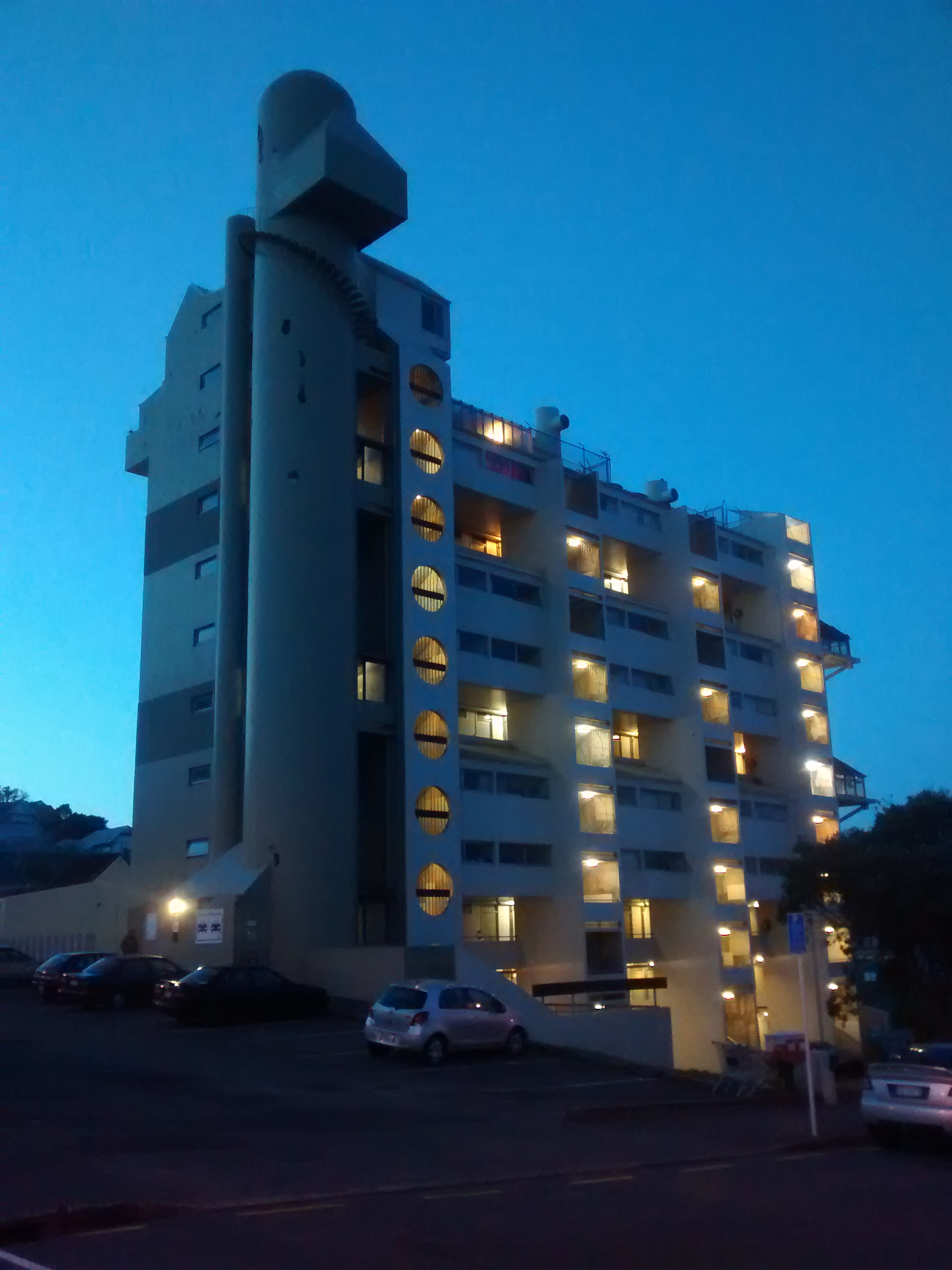
Arlington Council Flats, Wellington (demolished 2021)

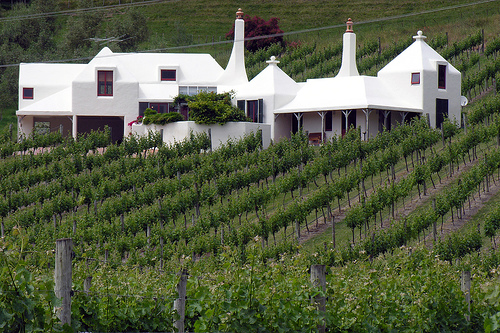
Buck House, Te Mata Estate

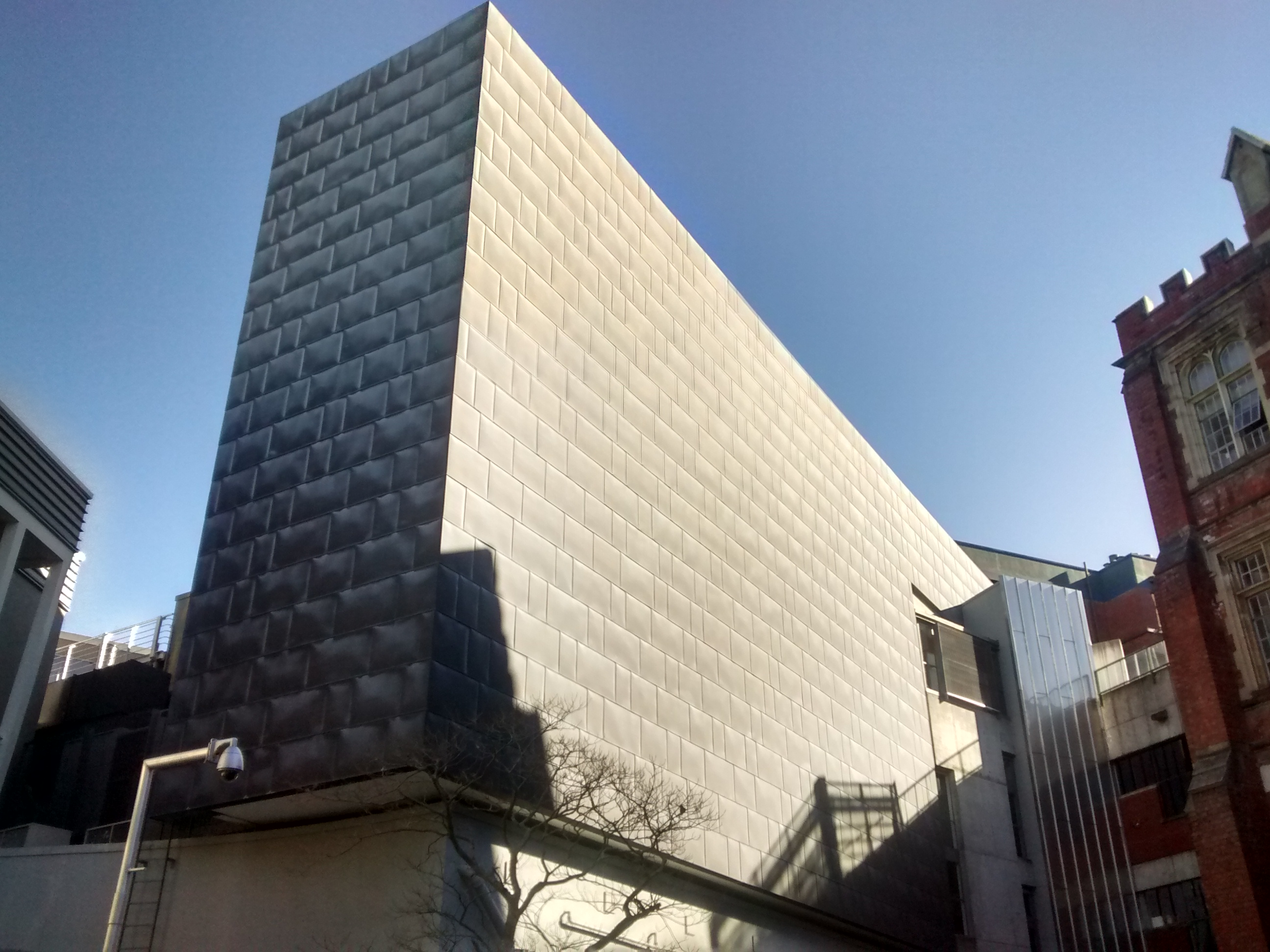
Adam Art Gallery, Victoria University of Wellington

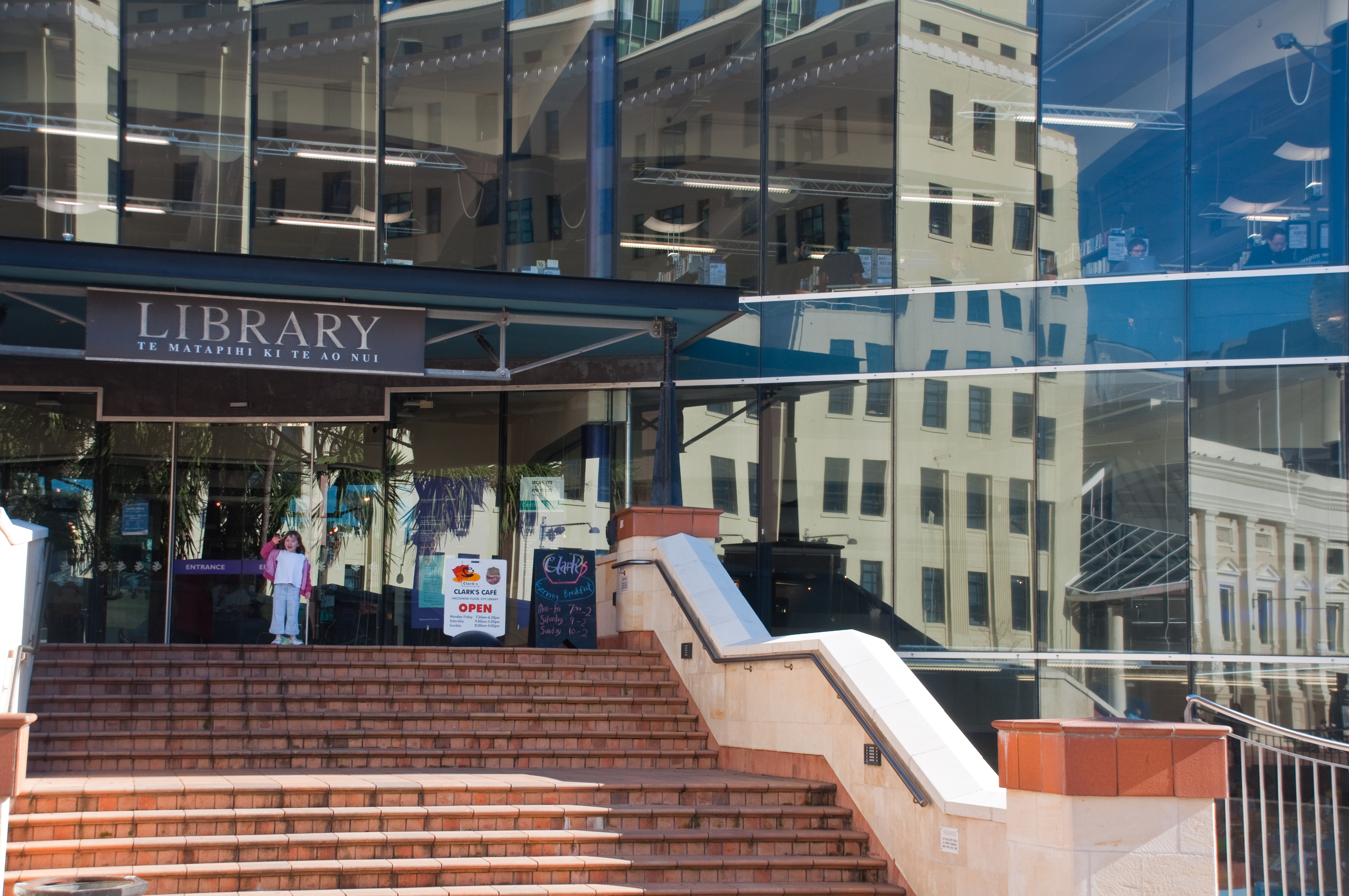
Wellington Central Library

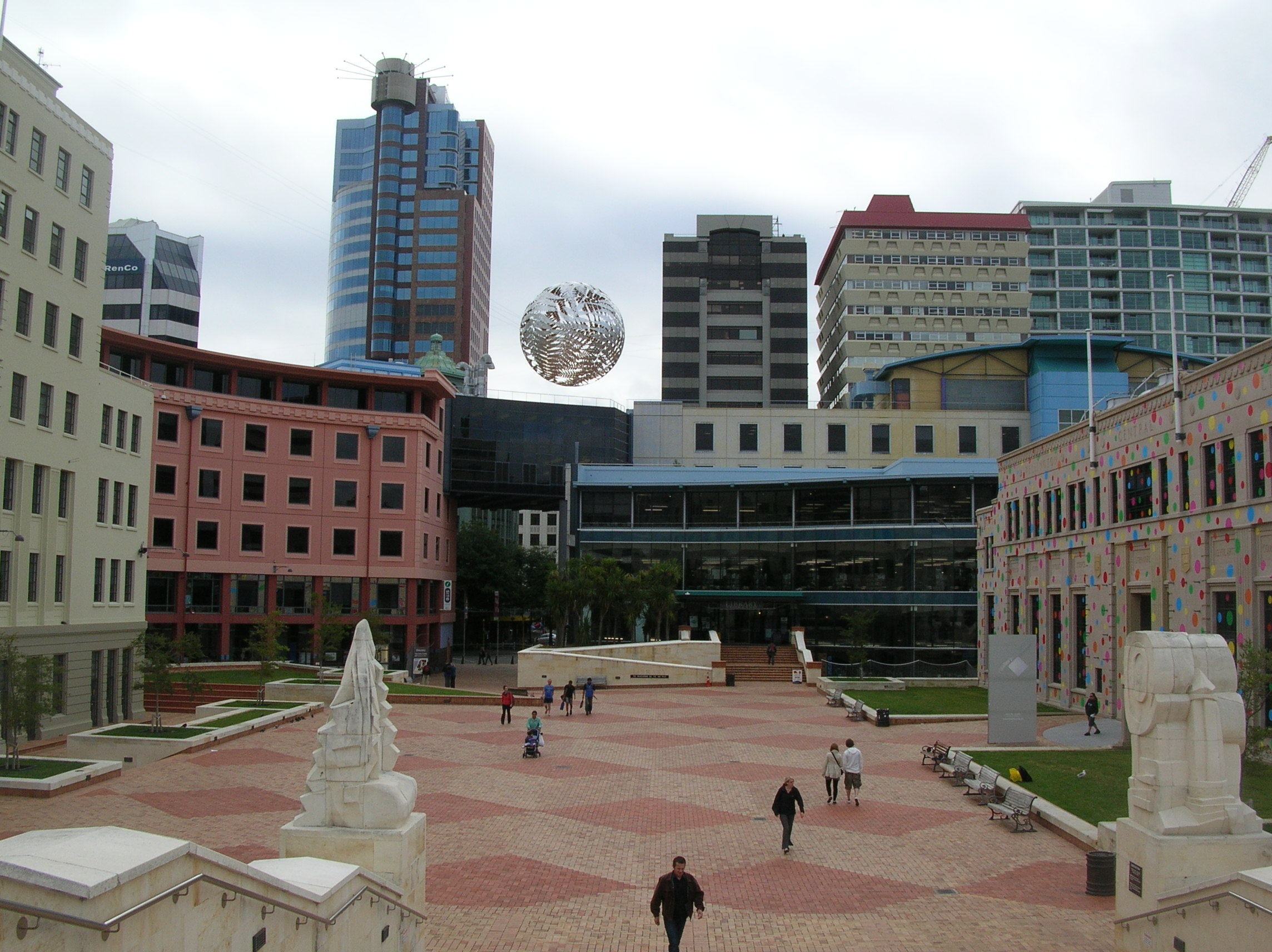
Civic Square, Wellington

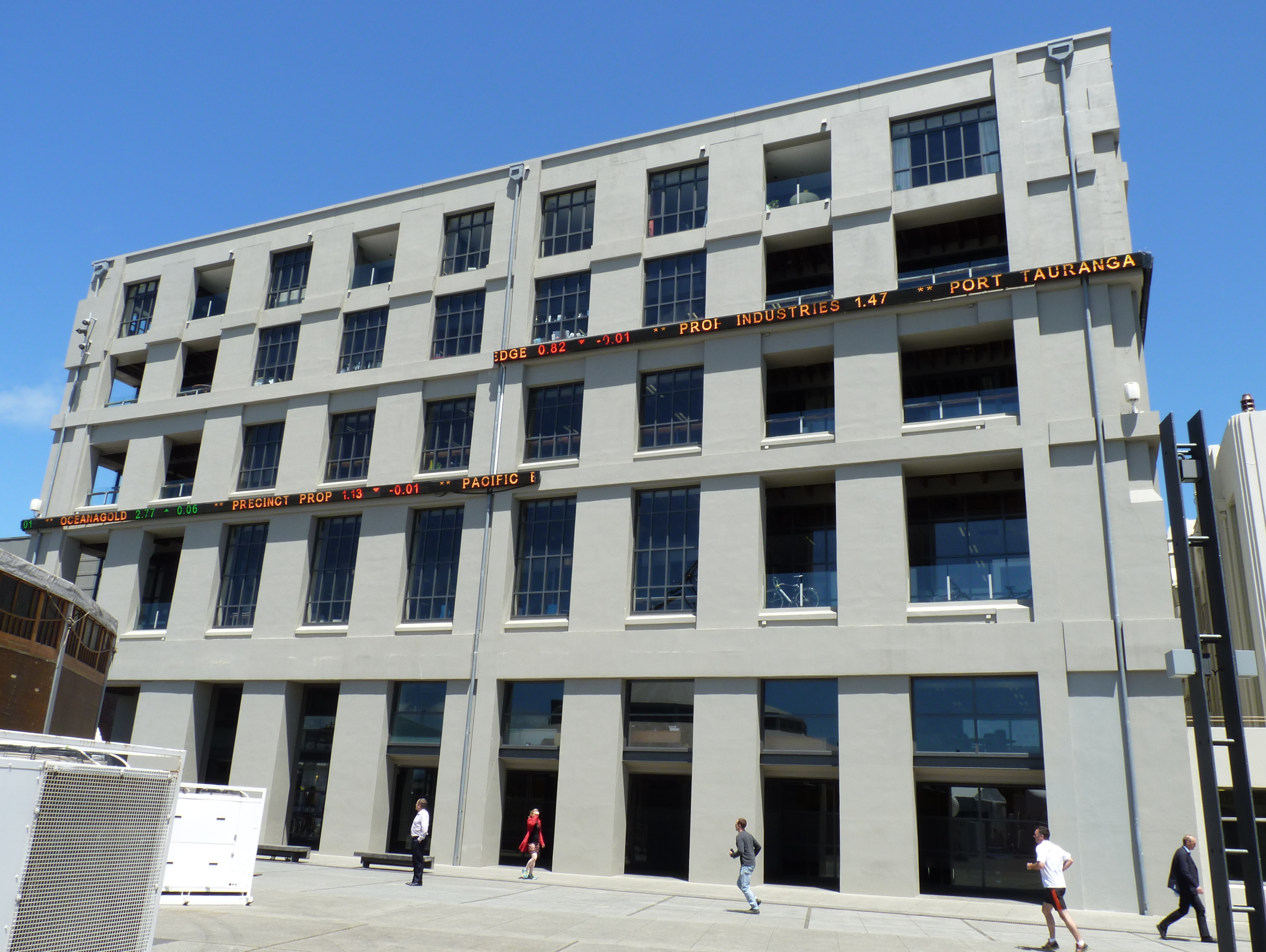
Odlins Building/NZX, Wellington

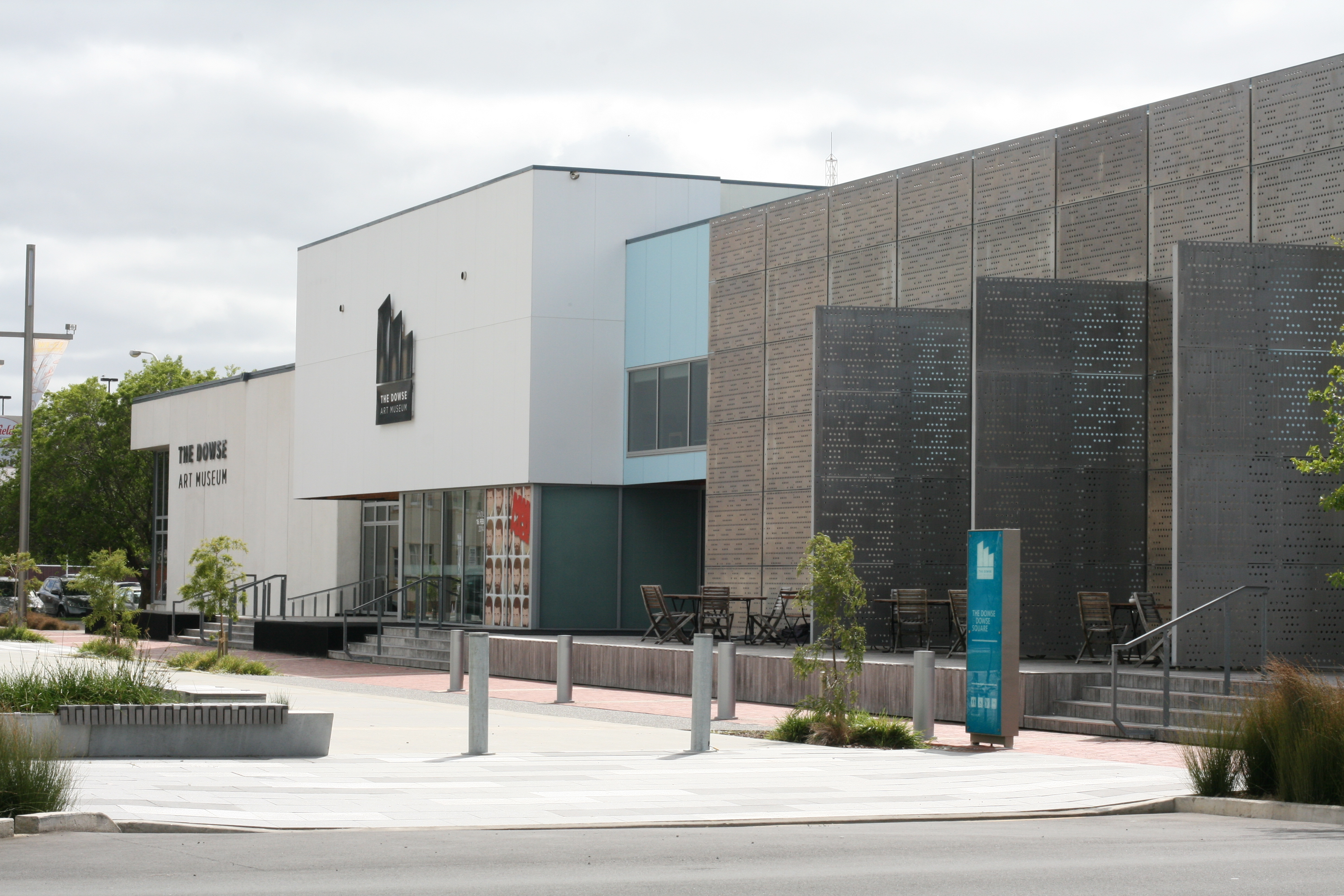
Dowse Art Museum, Lower Hutt

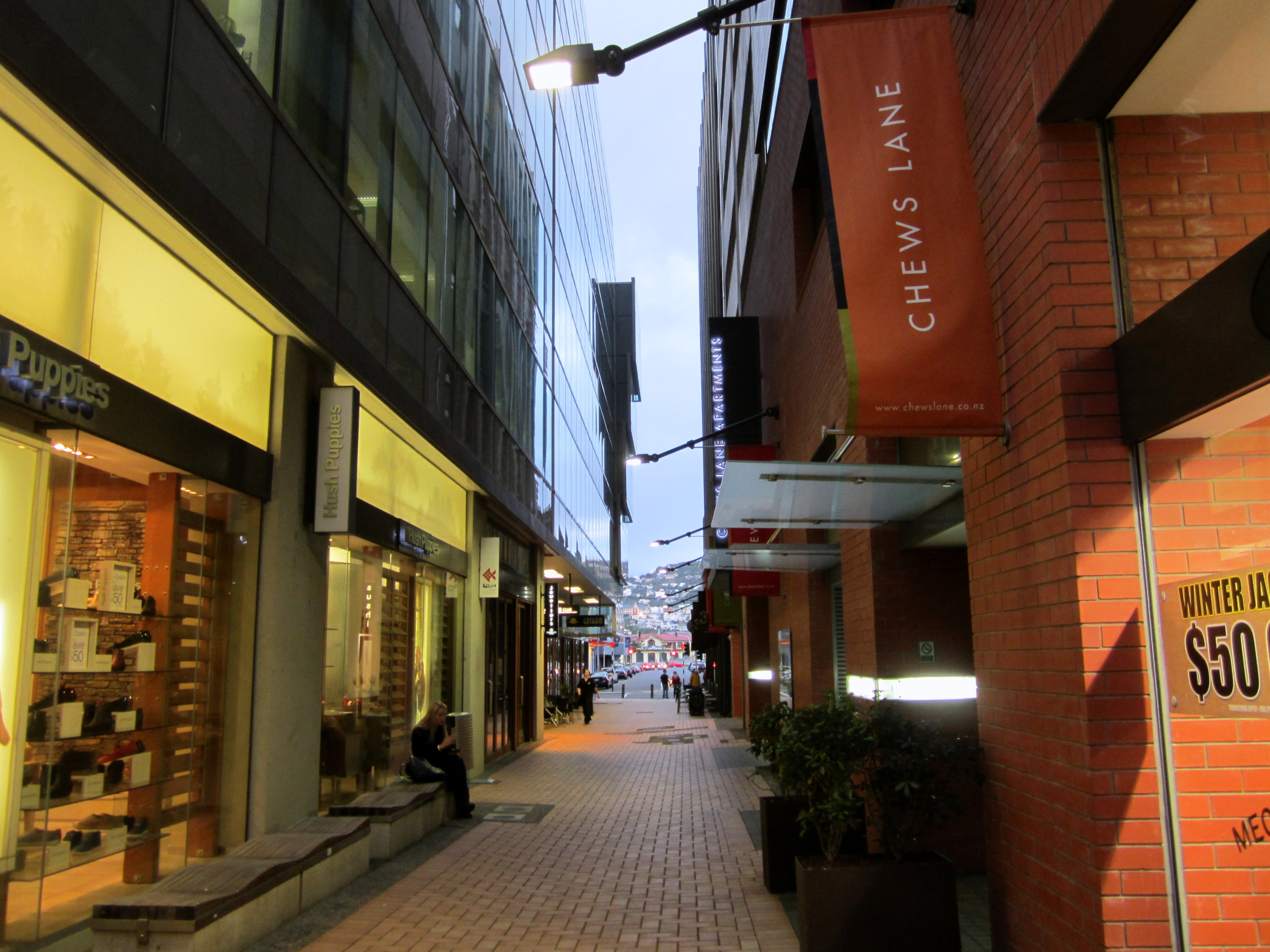
Chews Lane precinct, Wellington

== See also ==
- Roger Walker
- Miles Warren
