= The Hermit of Island Bay =

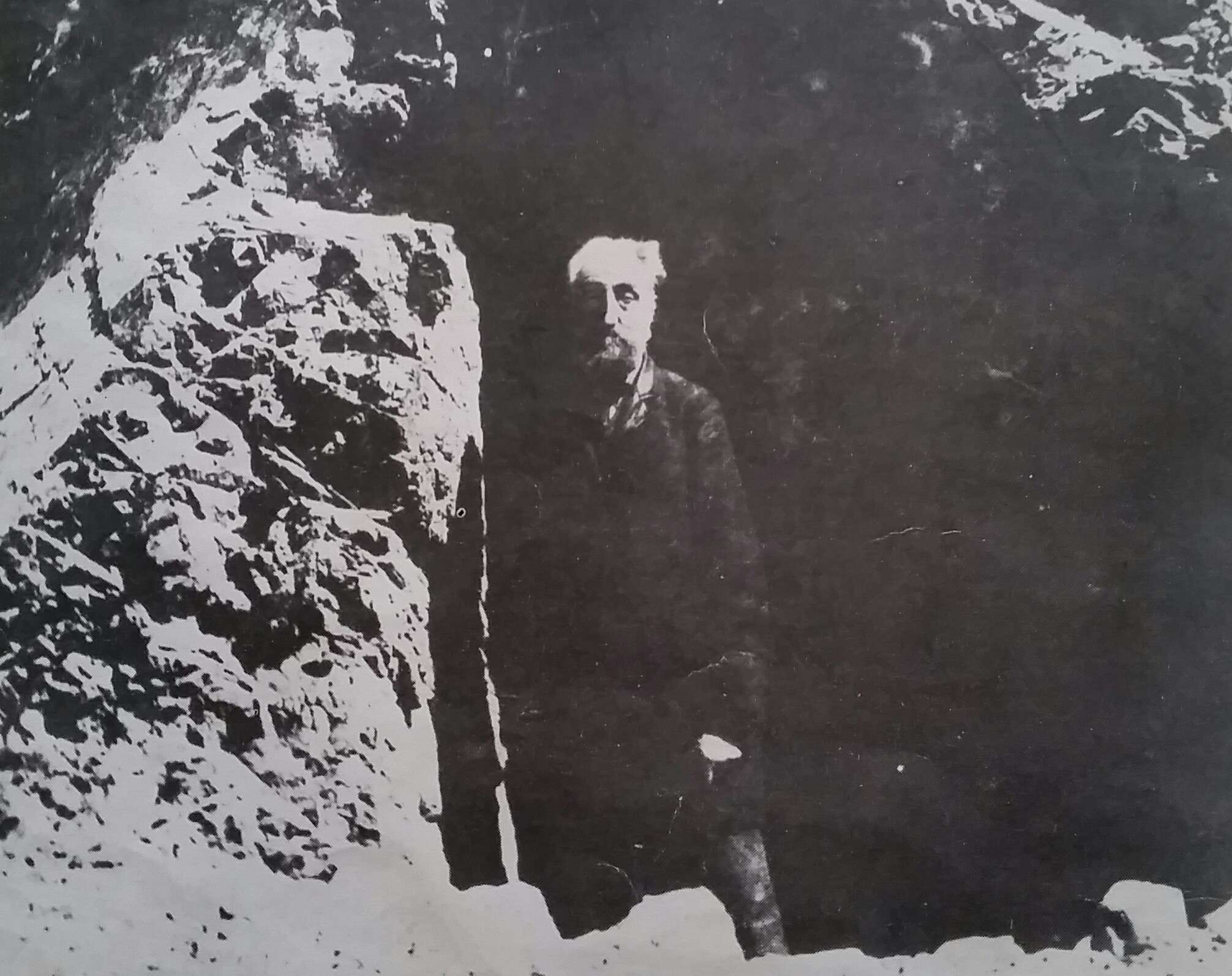
The Hermit of Island Bay

The Hermit of Island Bay was a well-known personality, and somewhat of a tourist attraction, at the end of the 19th century in Wellington, New Zealand.

The cave used by the hermit

His name is recorded as "Persse" by several newspapers of the time, and as "William Persse" by a biographer.

The Hermit lived for 17 years in a cave beside the southern coast, in Island Bay, close to Houghton Bay. The cave had a single opening, through which smoke from his fire exited.

Many tourists approached his cave and interacted with the Hermit, who is reported to have been neither pleased nor unhappy with the attention.

His cave was boarded up and partially destroyed when Queens Drive was built in 1894.

An oil painting depicting the Hermit in his cave beside his fire is held in the collection of the national museum of New Zealand, Te Papa Tongarewa.
