= Houghton Bay =

Suburb of Wellington City, New Zealand

Houghton Bay / Valley
- Suburb
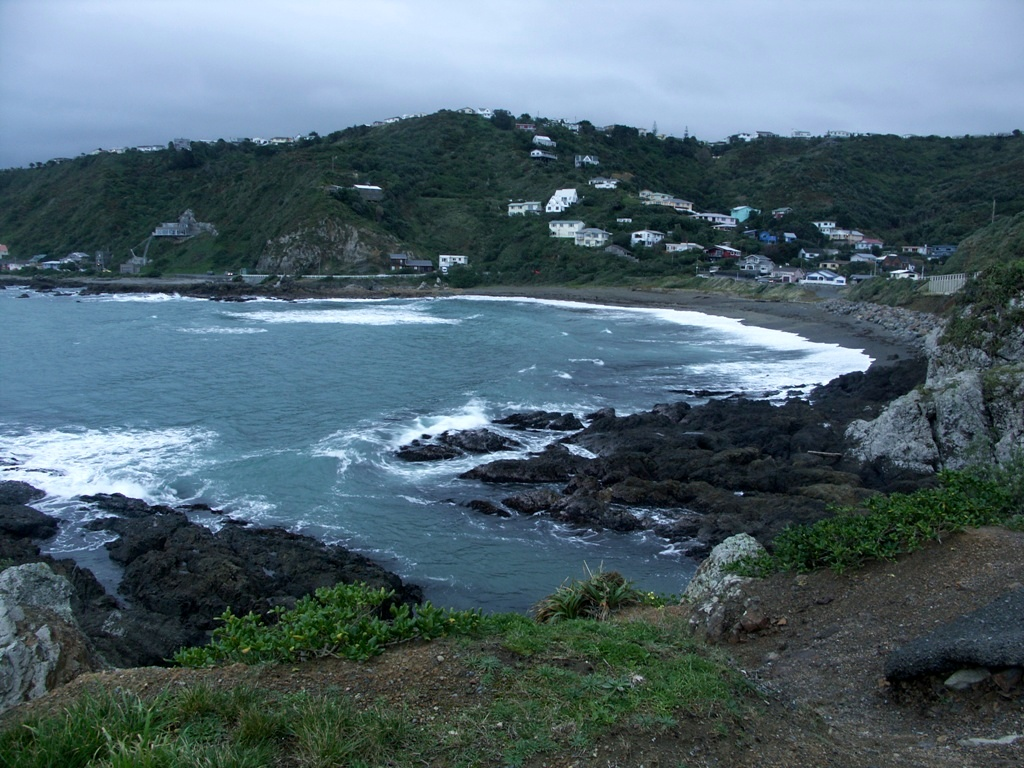
- Interactive map of Houghton Bay / Valley
- Coordinates: 41.342°S 174.785°E
- Country: New Zealand
- City: Wellington City
- Local authority: Wellington City Council
- Electoral ward: Paekawakawa/Southern Ward; Te Whanganui-a-Tara Māori Ward

Area
  - Land: 129 ha (320 acres)

Population (June 2025)
  - Total: 1,650
  - Density: 1,280/km^{2} (3,310/sq mi)

Southgate	Melrose	Lyall Bay
Island Bay	Houghton Bay
	Cook Strait

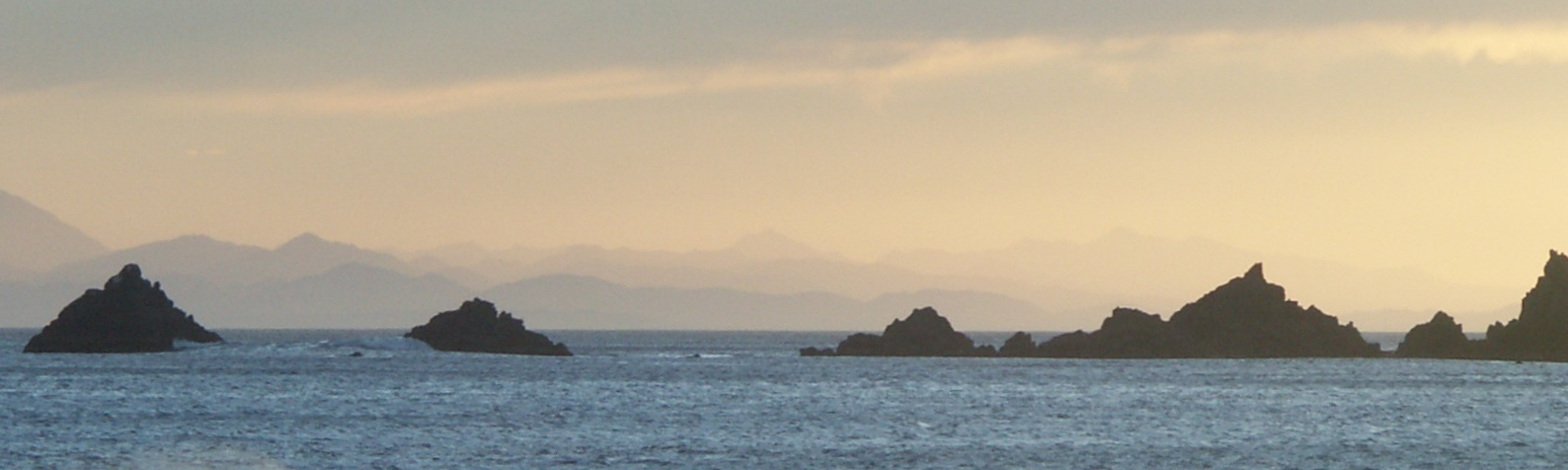
South Coast view to South Island

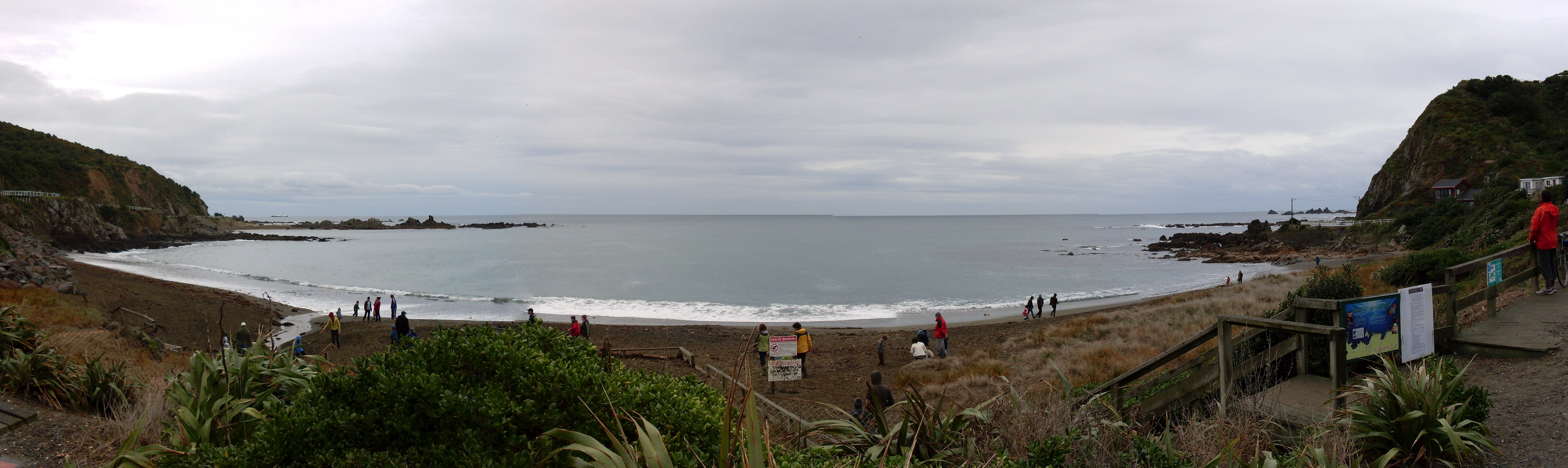
Houghton Bay Panorama

Houghton Bay, or Houghton Valley, is one of the southern suburbs of Wellington, New Zealand. It is located between Island Bay and Lyall Bay, on the rocky shores of the Cook Strait. It has two beaches, Houghton Bay and Princess Bay, used by surfers, swimmers and divers.

== History ==
Houghton Bay was named after Captain Robert Houghton, who was the person responsible for the powder magazine on Matiu / Somes Island, and later the signal station at Mount Albert above Houghton Bay.

In the 19th century The Hermit of Island Bay lived in a nearby cave.

== Features ==
Houghton Bay and Valley is predominantly a residential area, but also contains the southern part of Wellington's Southern Walkway, the Buckley Road reserve, Houghton Valley Playcentre, Houghton Valley School and the Southern Headlands Reserve.

Along with other parts of Wellington's South Coast it is a popular recreational diving spot, within the Taputeranga Marine Reserve. In 2005 the decommissioned frigate HMNZS Wellington was sunk off Houghton Bay, and is now an artificial reef and dive location. Houghton Bay is also a surfing spot, like nearby Lyall Bay.

Houghton Valley and Bay are home to musicians and artists, and to the Haewai Meadery and Wind Gardens.

On the hill overlooking the breakers is the Wellington dance and dining venue, The Pines.

The Aurora Australis can be seen, as the light pollution is shielded to some degree by the range of hills along the coastline. A dark sky is necessary as most aurorae are weak and barely visible to the naked eye at this latitude.

== Demographics ==
Houghton Bay statistical area covers 1.29 km^{2} (0.50 sq mi). It had an estimated population of 1,650 as of June 2025, with a population density of 1,279 people per km^{2}.

Historical population
Year	Pop.	±% p.a.
2006	1,488	—
2013	1,551	+0.59%
2018	1,677	+1.57%
2023	1,596	−0.99%

Houghton Bay had a population of 1,596 in the 2023 New Zealand census, a decrease of 81 people (−4.8%) since the 2018 census, and an increase of 45 people (2.9%) since the 2013 census. There were 762 males, 816 females, and 18 people of other genders in 636 dwellings. 9.0% of people identified as LGBTIQ+. The median age was 37.8 years (compared with 38.1 years nationally). There were 288 people (18.0%) aged under 15 years, 309 (19.4%) aged 15 to 29, 837 (52.4%) aged 30 to 64, and 162 (10.2%) aged 65 or older.

People could identify as more than one ethnicity. The results were 87.4% European (Pākehā); 10.7% Māori; 4.3% Pasifika; 7.0% Asian; 4.1% Middle Eastern, Latin American and African New Zealanders (MELAA); and 1.9% other, which includes people giving their ethnicity as "New Zealander". English was spoken by 97.6%, Māori by 3.2%, Samoan by 0.9%, and other languages by 16.4%. No language could be spoken by 1.5% (e.g. too young to talk). New Zealand Sign Language was known by 0.4%. The percentage of people born overseas was 29.3, compared with 28.8% nationally.

Religious affiliations were 18.8% Christian, 1.5% Hindu, 1.3% Islam, 0.2% Māori religious beliefs, 1.1% Buddhist, 0.6% New Age, 0.6% Jewish, and 1.5% other religions. People who answered that they had no religion were 69.5%, and 5.5% of people did not answer the census question.

Of those at least 15 years old, 660 (50.5%) people had a bachelor's or higher degree, 477 (36.5%) had a post-high school certificate or diploma, and 174 (13.3%) people exclusively held high school qualifications. The median income was $62,400, compared with $41,500 nationally. 363 people (27.8%) earned over $100,000 compared to 12.1% nationally. The employment status of those at least 15 was 798 (61.0%) full-time, 189 (14.4%) part-time, and 30 (2.3%) unemployed.

== Education ==
Houghton Valley School is a co-educational state primary school for Year 1 to 6 students, with a roll of 193 as of October 2025. The school opened in 1931.

== See also ==
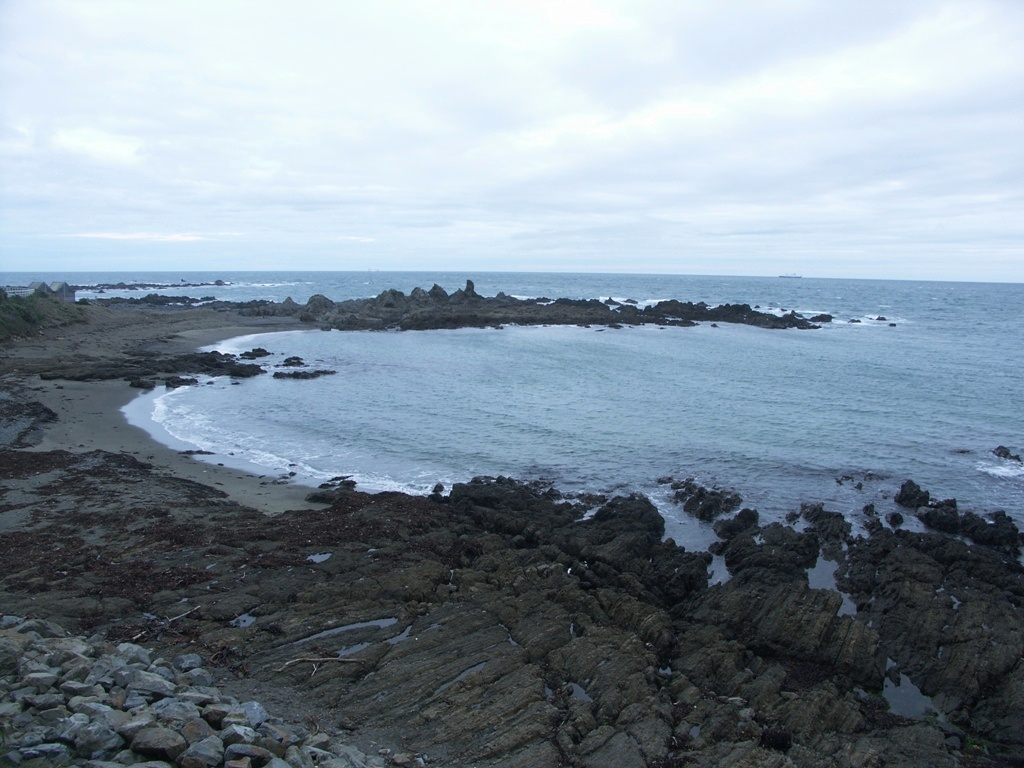
Houghton Bay East and Princess Bay

- Te Raekaihau Point
