= Lyall Bay =

Suburb of Wellington City, New Zealand

Lyall Bay Huetepara (Māori)
- Suburb
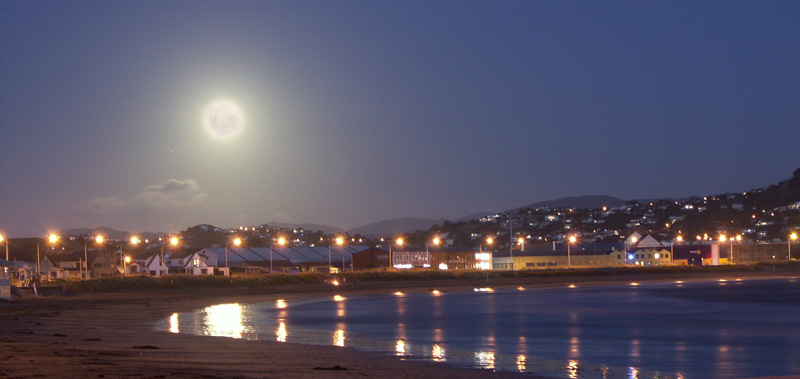
- Full moon over the bay
- Interactive map of Lyall Bay; Huetepara (Māori)
- Coordinates: 41°19′48″S 174°47′37″E
- Country: New Zealand
- City: Wellington City
- Local authority: Wellington City Council
- Electoral ward: Motukairangi/Eastern Ward; Te Whanganui-a-Tara Māori Ward

Area
  - Land: 55 ha (140 acres)

Population (June 2025)
  - Total: 2,680
  - Density: 4,900/km^{2} (13,000/sq mi)
- Airports: Wellington International Airport

Kilbirnie	Kilbirnie	Rongotai
Melrose	Lyall Bay	Rongotai
	(Cook Strait)	Moa Point

Lyall Bay is a bay and suburb on the south side of the Rongotai isthmus in Wellington, New Zealand.

The bay is a popular surf beach, featuring a breakwater at the eastern end. It is home to two surf lifesaving clubs and has also been the site of surf lifesaving championships. Lyall Bay is a very popular and safe swimming beach. The beach is only two thirds of its original size: the construction of Wellington International Airport took away the eastern third of the beach.

The suburb consists of most of the southern half of the Rongotai isthmus, although Wellington International Airport and a small industrial area next to it are often considered to be part of Rongotai. Lyall Bay is predominantly a residential area, but also contains a part of Wellington's Southern Walkway and the Southern Headlands Reserve. The suburb has a bus service and is near to the Kilbirnie shopping centre and the Tirangi Road Airport Retail Park. There is a primary school (Lyall Bay School), a Playcentre, a lawn bowls club, two churches and a small range of shops. The suburb is also home to Fat Freddy's Drop, a popular Wellington band. The south-western border has Te Raekaihau Point as the dividing landform to Houghton Bay.

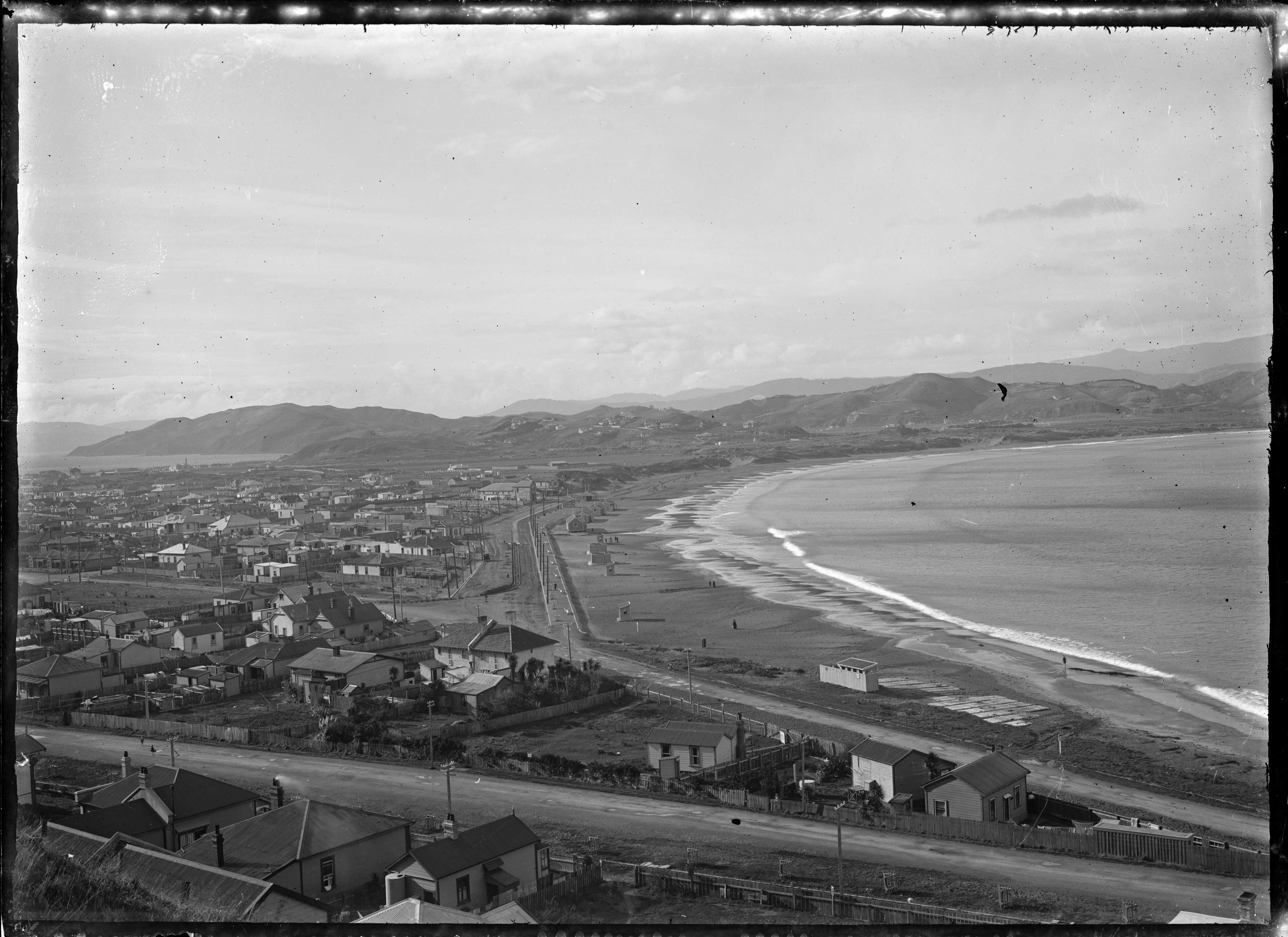
View of Lyall Bay in the early 20th century

Lyall Bay was probably the ancient mouth of the Hutt River. The current isthmus was created by geologic upheaval as a result of recurring earthquakes, notably the Haowhenua earthquake in the fifteenth century and the 1855 Wairarapa earthquake. The 1855 earthquake caused a tsunami that swept over the isthmus between Lyall Bay and Evans Bay, leaving fish stranded amongst the sand dunes.

== Etymology ==
Lyall Bay was earlier known as False Bay, because ships would mistake the bay for the entrance to Wellington Harbour. A Māori name for the beach was Hue te para, which literally means 'gourd' (hue), 'the' (te), and 'ripe' (para) Writing in 1919, Elsdon Best stated that Hue te para appeared on a map drawn by Crawford but that none of the Māori he had spoken to knew of that name.

Some believe that Lyall Bay is named after Dr David Lyall of the survey ship HMS Acheron, but he didn't serve on that ship until 1847, by which time the name Lyall Bay was already in use. Another theory is that it is named after George Lyall, one of the directors of the New Zealand Company. Early records sometimes showed the name as Lyell Bay, and it has been claimed that it was named after geologist Charles Lyell.

== History ==
The suburb of Lyall Bay was initially named Maranui by H D Crawford and H M Hayward, who began selling 80 sections for a new township at the bay in 1896. Maranui School (now Lyall Bay School) opened in February 1909. Progress of the suburb was slow until the Wellington City Council opened a tram line extension down Onepu Road to the beach in December 1909. This led to rapid development and an influx of day trippers at the weekends.

=== Sand drift ===
Most development was at the western side of the suburb. The eastern side was mostly sand dunes, and the tramline was often blocked by drifting sand. Wellington City Council responded to the problem in 1925 with a programme to level the dunes and cover much of the area with a layer of clay to hold the sand in place. In 1932 the Council built the distinctive 'whirler' sea wall along the beach. It was designed to blow sand back on to the beach instead of over the road.

Sand and gravel built up on the beach during 1939, and from the 1940s until the 1960s Wellington City Council paid contractors to remove it. The beach became severely eroded, with the level of the beach at the surf lifesaving clubhouses about 3 ft (1m) lower in 1961 than it had been previously and no beach remaining at high tide. Residents blamed the removal of material from the beach and the construction of the breakwater at the airport end which had changed the currents in the bay. The Council countered that sand and gravel was removed carefully and that the erosion was a natural process. Residents at the eastern end of the bay where there was no seawall also suffered from sand drifting across the road, so in 1975 the Council built a seawall eastwards from Onepu Road.

From 1990, Wellington City Council began a programme of sand dune restoration at the eastern end of Lyall Bay beach. Part of the dune was fenced off and boardwalks constructed for access to the beach through the dune. Thousands of pingao and other plants were planted to hold the sand in place.

=== Reclamation for Wellington Airport ===
In December 1935 Wellington City Council approved Rongotai aerodrome as the site of an airport suitable for all types of aircraft, which would have involved reclamation of 26 acres (10.5 hectares) of seabed at the eastern end of Lyall Bay. Some reclamation took place in Lyall Bay in 1940 with spoil from Moa Point Hill. After further discussion a plan was released in 1944 which would require reclamation in Evans Bay and a retaining wall at Lyall Bay. By 1950 the plans included reclamation in Lyall Bay, and by 1954 the work was underway. A breakwater was created and Moa Point Hill was completely flattened, with the spoil pushed into Lyall Bay. In total about a third of the bay was reclaimed for the airport, which opened in 1959.

== Surfing ==
People have enjoyed surfing at Lyall Bay for over a century. Surfing was popularised when Duke Paoa Kahanamoku from Hawaii visited Lyall Bay in March 1915 and demonstrated surfing to a large crowd. The eastern end of the beach is known as Surfers Corner, and the surf break at that end of the bay is known as The Corner. The waves here are influenced by the breakwater created when Wellington Airport was built in the 1950s. In 2015 the airport announced plans to extend its runway. Surfers believed this would adversely affect the surf in the bay, but the airport said they would build an artificial reef 500m offshore to lessen the effect of the runway expansion on the waves. As of 2025 the runway has not been extended and the reef has not been built.

== Surf Lifesaving ==
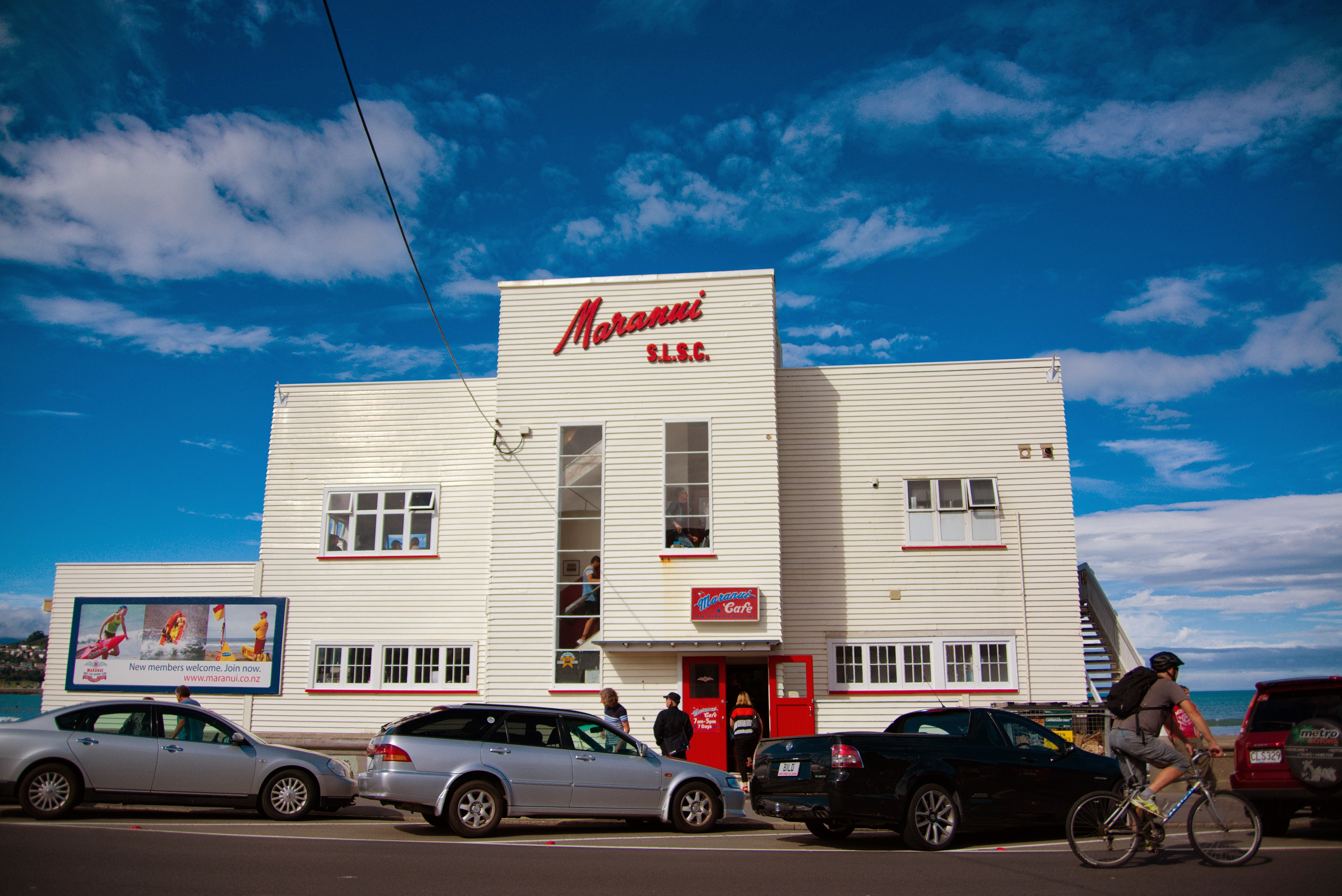
Maranui Surf Lifesaving building at Lyall Bay beach, home to the Maranui Cafe.

Lyall Bay is home to two surf lifesaving clubs: the Lyall Bay Surf Lifesaving Club and the Maranui Surf Lifesaving Club. Lyall Bay Surf and Lifesaving Club was formed in 1910 but after a dispute between members a group split off in October 1911 to form the Maranui club. In 2021 the Lyall Bay club opened a new clubhouse to replace the old one built in 1957. The new building has space for club activities and storage as well as toilets, changing rooms and outdoor showers and taps for public use. Maranui SLSC's building was built in 1930 to replace an earlier building. It has been altered over the years and in 2005 Maranui cafe opened on the top floor. The building was destroyed by fire in August 2006, and then rebuilt. Volunteers from the Lyall Bay club patrol the beach during summer months and Maranui club members patrol Oriental Bay. Members of both clubs compete nationally in various surf sports, which are sometimes held at Lyall Bay.

== Demographics ==
Lyall Bay statistical area covers 0.55 km^{2} (0.21 sq mi). It had an estimated population of 2,680 as of June 2025, with a population density of 4,873 people per km^{2}.

Historical population
Year	Pop.	±% p.a.
2006	2,580	—
2013	2,595	+0.08%
2018	2,673	+0.59%
2023	2,598	−0.57%

Lyall Bay had a population of 2,598 in the 2023 New Zealand census, a decrease of 75 people (−2.8%) since the 2018 census, and an increase of 3 people (0.1%) since the 2013 census. There were 1,218 males, 1,350 females, and 30 people of other genders in 1,038 dwellings. 7.7% of people identified as LGBTIQ+. The median age was 36.6 years (compared with 38.1 years nationally). There were 420 people (16.2%) aged under 15 years, 564 (21.7%) aged 15 to 29, 1,311 (50.5%) aged 30 to 64, and 303 (11.7%) aged 65 or older.

People could identify as more than one ethnicity. The results were 75.3% European (Pākehā); 13.4% Māori; 7.2% Pasifika; 14.8% Asian; 4.4% Middle Eastern, Latin American and African New Zealanders (MELAA); and 2.9% other, which includes people giving their ethnicity as "New Zealander". English was spoken by 95.6%, Māori by 3.8%, Samoan by 2.1%, and other languages by 17.9%. No language could be spoken by 2.1% (e.g. too young to talk). New Zealand Sign Language was known by 0.3%. The percentage of people born overseas was 28.4, compared with 28.8% nationally.

Religious affiliations were 25.1% Christian, 3.7% Hindu, 1.7% Islam, 0.8% Māori religious beliefs, 0.9% Buddhist, 0.7% New Age, 0.3% Jewish, and 1.6% other religions. People who answered that they had no religion were 59.1%, and 6.2% of people did not answer the census question.

Of those at least 15 years old, 981 (45.0%) people had a bachelor's or higher degree, 831 (38.2%) had a post-high school certificate or diploma, and 366 (16.8%) people exclusively held high school qualifications. The median income was $56,100, compared with $41,500 nationally. 438 people (20.1%) earned over $100,000 compared to 12.1% nationally. The employment status of those at least 15 was 1,335 (61.3%) full-time, 288 (13.2%) part-time, and 57 (2.6%) unemployed.

== Education ==
Lyall Bay School is a co-educational state primary school for Year 1 to 6 students, with a roll of 282 as of July 2026. It opened in 1909.
