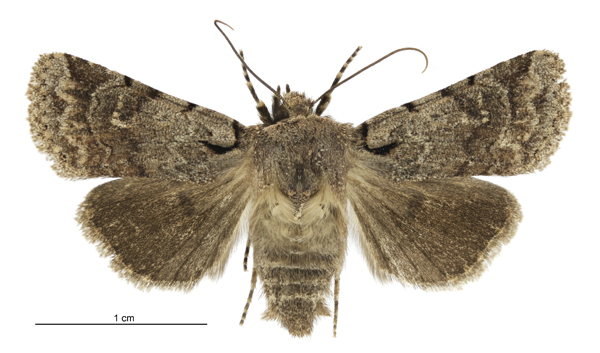
- Female
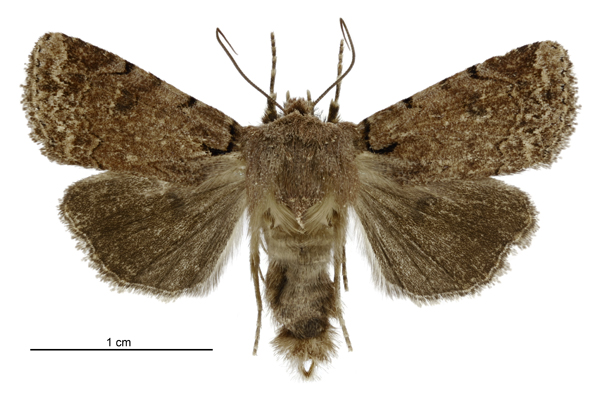
- Male

Scientific classification
- Kingdom: Animalia
- Phylum: Arthropoda
- Clade: Pancrustacea
- Class: Insecta
- Order: Lepidoptera
- Superfamily: Noctuoidea
- Family: Noctuidae
- Genus: Austramathes
- Species: A. fortis

Binomial name
- Austramathes fortis (Butler, 1880)

Synonyms
- Toxocampa fortis Butler, 1880; Miselia iota Hudson, 1903; Homohadena fortis (Butler, 1880)

= Austramathes fortis =

Species of moth

Austramathes fortis is a species of moth in the family Noctuidae. It is endemic to New Zealand and is found in both the North and the South Islands but has yet to be recorded at Stewart Island. It can be found in shrubland containing its host species at a range of altitudes from sea-level up to 1840 m. The larvae of this moth feed on several Melicytus species including M. crassifolius, M. alpinus, M. macrophyllus and M. novae-zelandiae. The larvae pupate in a cocoon of silk at the base of its host plant. It can take between 25 and 45 days before the adult moth emerges. Adults can be found on the wing during the months of July to March. The adults tend to be on the wing in twilight hours but have also been known to be active during the late afternoon. They are attracted to light but this behaviour may limit the number seen at light traps. The distinguishing feature of this moth is the curved black line at the base of its forewing. This species is unlikely to be confused with any other species in its range but it is very similar in appearance to A. squaliolus. However this latter species is only found on the Chatham Islands.

== Taxonomy ==
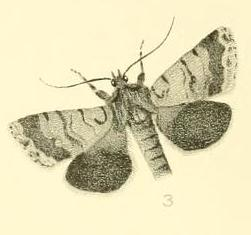
Illustration by George Hudson of Miselia iota, now known as A. fortis.

It was first described by Arthur Gardiner Butler in 1880 and named Toxocampa fortis. In 1903 George Hudson, believing he was describing a new species, named it Miselia iota. Edward Meyrick, in 1912, synonymised this name and placed this species within the Homohadena genus. In 1988 J. S. Dugdale in his catalogue of New Zealand Lepidoptera confirmed this placement. In 2017 Robert Hoare undertook a revision of New Zealand Noctuinae and placed this species in the Austramathes genus, as a result this species is now known as Austramathes fortis. The male holotype was collected by Mr Skellon in the Marlborough region and is held at the Natural History Museum, London.

== Description ==
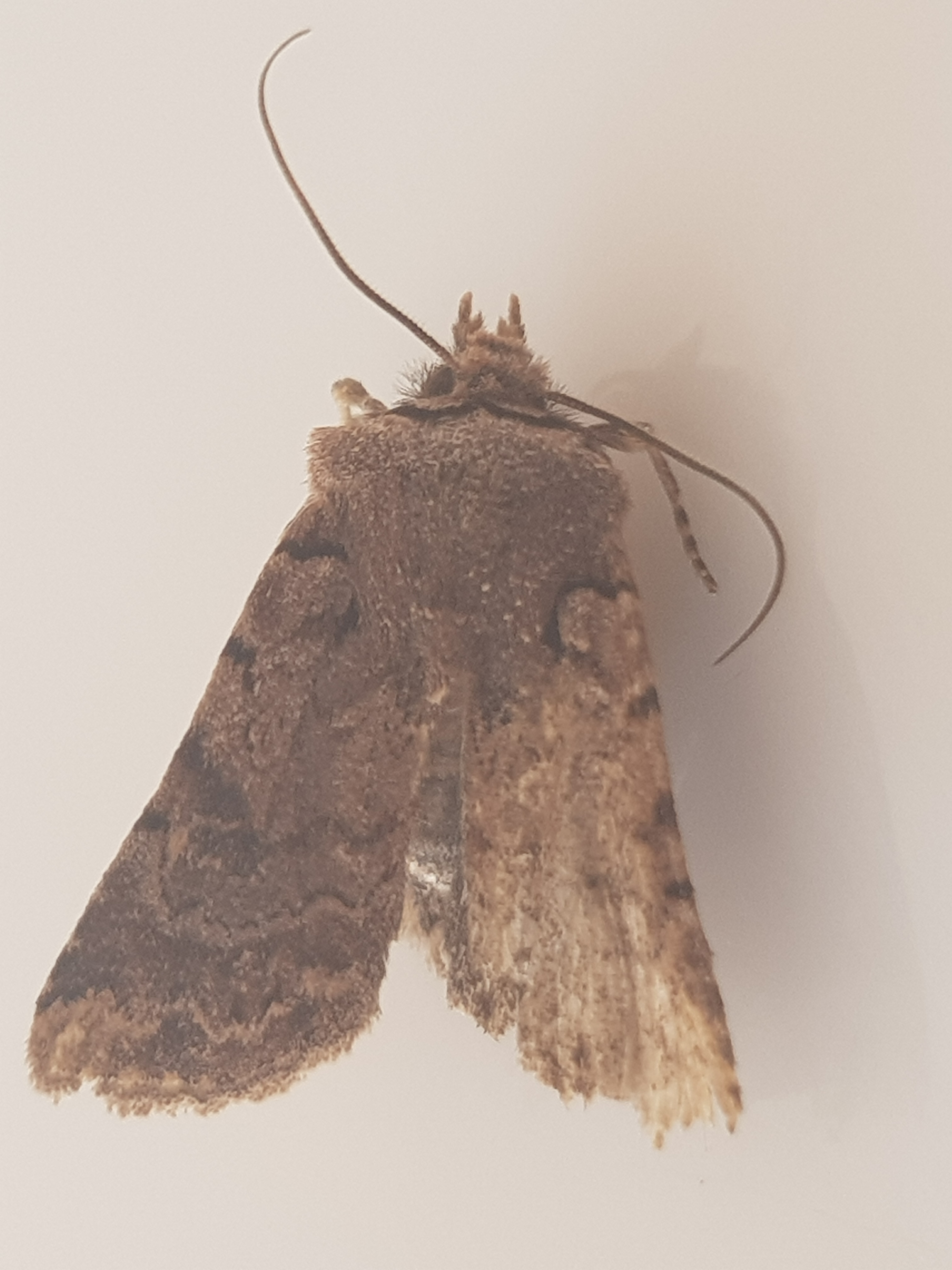
Austramathes fortis

The larvae of this species have two colour forms with one form being predominantly green coloured and the other being darkish grey. Hoare hypothesises that the latter form is likely to be more common as that colouration would assist the larva in camouflaging against the bark or base of its host plant.

Butler originally described the adults of this species as:

Greyish-brown; primaries with a slightly irregular L-shaped black marking at the base; two widely separated black costal dots commencing the ordinary lines, which are slender, black and very irregularly angulated; external border pale, limited internally by an ill-defined irregular black line; a marginal series of little slender black lines; secondaries much darker than the primaries and more decidedly sericeous, fringe white-spotted; collar crossed by a bisinuated black stripe; abdomen dark grey with brownish fringes and anal tuft; under surface pale brown; wings sericeous, speckled with blackish, and with blackish discal stripe; primaries greyish excepting at the borders; secondaries with a large black discocellular lunule; legs above dusky, banded with whitish. Expanse of wings 1 inch 2 lines.

George Hudson described the adults of this species as follows:

The expansion of the wings is a little over 1 in. The fore wings are dull brownish-ochreous finely speckled with black; there is a conspicuous hook-shaped black mark close to the base, a sharp black mark on the costa at about 1/4, a clouded wavy line near the middle of the wing, darker on the costa, a sharp black mark on the costa just beyond this, followed by a wavy band of dark brownish-black, very much broader on the costa than on the dorsum, and bordered with a pale wavy line towards the termen. The hind wings are dark brownish- black. The cilia of the fore wings are brownish-ochreous, of the hind wings dark - grey. The head and thorax are brownish-ochreous, and the abdomen grey. There are two conspicuous black marks on the anterior portion of the thorax.

The wingspan of the male A. fortis is between 29 and 37 mm where as the wingspan of the female is between 29 and 41 mm. This species is unlikely to be confused with any other species in its range. The distinguishing feature for this species is the curved black line at the base of the forewing. It is however very similar in appearance to A. squaliolus but this latter species is only found on the Chatham Islands.

== Distribution ==
The species is endemic to New Zealand. It is found in both the North and the South Islands but has yet to be recorded at Stewart Island. It can be found in shrubland containing its host species at a range of altitudes from sea-level up to 1,840 m (6,040 ft). This species is regarded as uncommon but can be more numerous on the coast and on eastern islands.

== Behaviour ==
The larvae pupate in a cocoon of silk at the base of its host plant. It can take between 25 and 45 days before the adult moth emerges. Adults can be found on the wing during the months of July to March. The adults tend to be on the wing in twilight hours but have also been known to be active during the late afternoon. This behaviour may result in them not being collected as frequently via light trapping in the later evening hours. However this species is known to be attracted to light.

== Host species ==
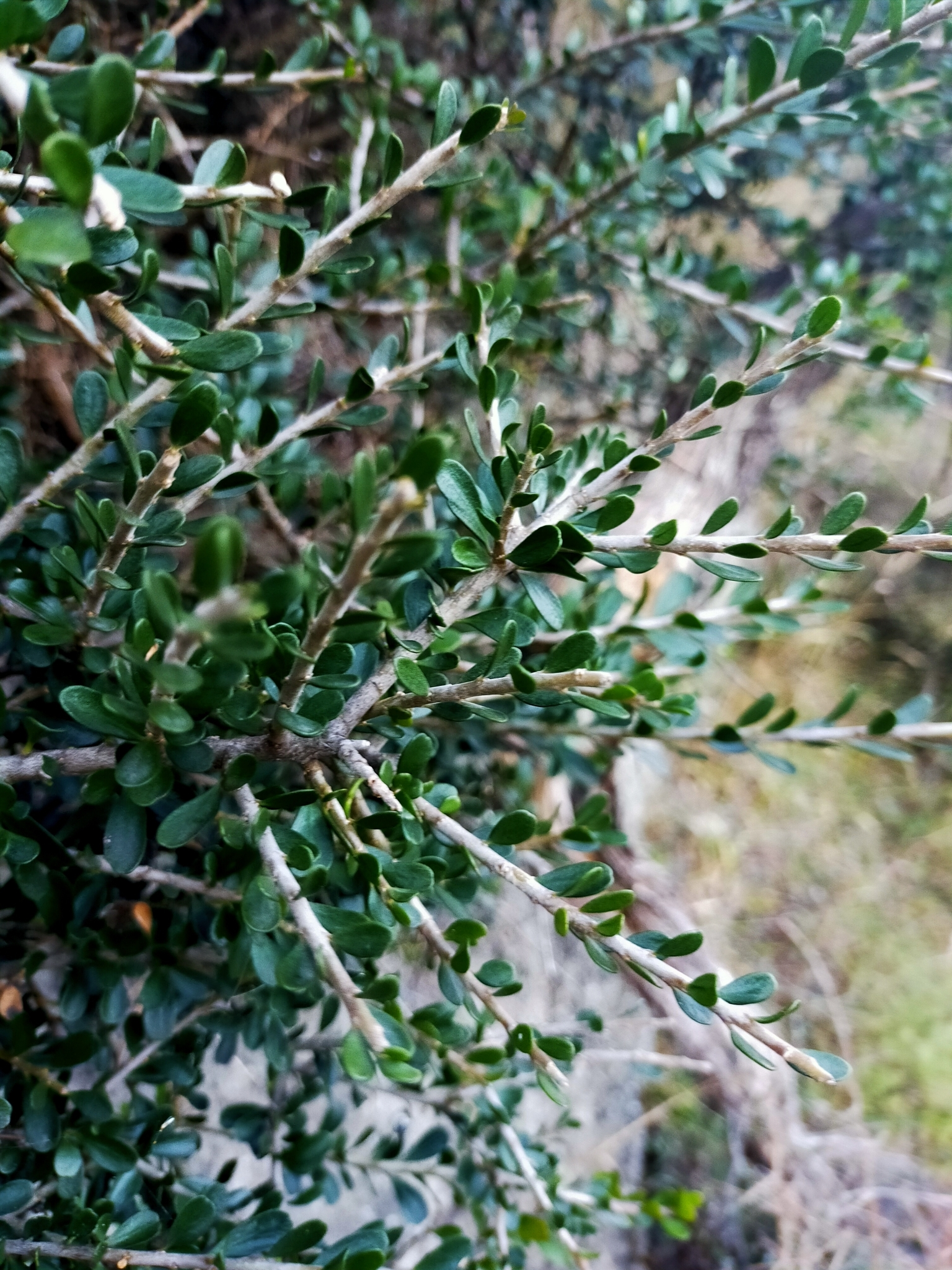
Melicytus crassifolius, host species for A. fortis.

The larvae of this moth has been shown to feed on several Melicytus species including M. crassifolius, M. alpinus, M. macrophyllus and M. novae-zelandiae.
