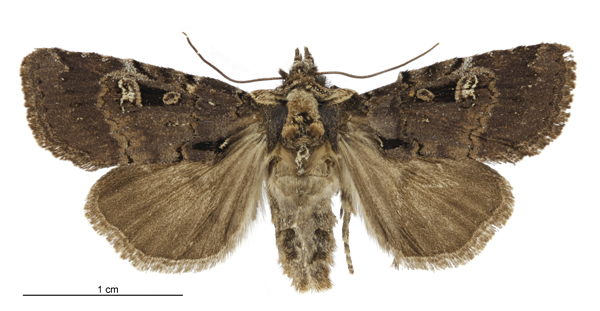
- Female
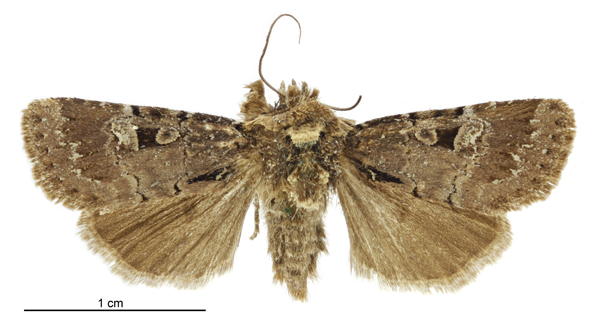
- Male

Scientific classification
- Kingdom: Animalia
- Phylum: Arthropoda
- Class: Insecta
- Order: Lepidoptera
- Superfamily: Noctuoidea
- Family: Noctuidae
- Genus: Austramathes
- Species: A. pessota

Binomial name
- Austramathes pessota (Meyrick, 1887)

Synonyms
- Miselia pessota Meyrick, 1887; Sympistis pessota (Meyrick, 1887); Hypnotype pessota (Meyrick, 1887); Andesia pessota (Meyrick, 1887)

= Austramathes pessota =

Species of moth endemic to New Zealand

Austramathes pessota is a species of moth in the family Noctuidae. It is endemic to New Zealand and is found in Northland, in the southern North Island and in the South Island, mainly on the eastern side of that island but is also present in Fiordland. It is not regarded as being present in either Dunedin or the Southland district. This species lives in shrubland at altitudes ranging from sea-level up to subalpine. As at 2017, the larvae have yet to be described or photographed but it is known that they feed on Melicytus alpinus and it is likely that Melicytus micranthus is also a host. Adults of this species are distinctively patterned and coloured. Its appearance differs from its close relatives such as A. purpurea as it lacks the purple hue that can be seen on the latter species forewings. It also differs from A. coelacantha as it is much darker and has a distinctive small, round, pale mark on its forewing. Adults are on the wing from December to April.

== Taxonomy ==
A. pessota was first described by Edward Meyrick in 1887 under the name Miselia pessota using specimens collected in Christchurch. In 1906 this species was tentatively placed in the genus Sympistis by George Hampson. Meyrick, in 1911, disagreed with this placement but somewhat doubtfully suggested placing the species in the genus Hypnotype. Meyrick again reconsidered the taxonomy of this species in 1914 and placed it within the genus Andesia. IN 1988 J. S. Dugdale agreed with this placement. Robert J. B. Hoare undertook a major review of New Zealand Noctuidae and placed it within the genus Austramathes in 2017. The female lectotype was collected at Riccarton Bush and is held in the Fereday Collection at the Canterbury Museum.

== Description ==
As at 2017, the larva of this species has not been described nor photographed.

George Hudson described the adults of this species as follows:

The expansion of the wings is 1 inch. The fore-wings are dull purplish-brown; there is an oblong black mark at the base of the dorsum containing a slender curved white line; the orbicular is rather small, round, margined first with dull white and then with black; the reniform is large, oblong, dull white, margined with pale ochreous towards the base of the wing; there is a conspicuous oblong black mark between the orbicular and reniform stigmata. The hind-wings are dull grey, with the cilia paler.

The adult male of this species has a wingspan of between 25 and 28 mm and the female has a wingspan of between 28 and 32 mm. This species is distinctively patterned and coloured. Its appearance differs from its close relatives such as A. purpurea as it lacks the purple hue that can be seen on the latter species forewings. It also differs from A. coelacantha as it is much darker and has a distinctive small, round, pale mark on its forewing.

== Distribution ==
This species is endemic to New Zealand. A. pessota can be found in Northland, in the southern North Island and in the South Island, mainly on the eastern side of that island but is also present in Fiordland. This species is not regarded as being present in Dunedin or the Southland district.

== Habitat ==
This species lives in shrubland at altitudes ranging from sea-level up to subalpine.

== Behaviour ==
The adults of this species are on the wing from December to April.

== Host species ==
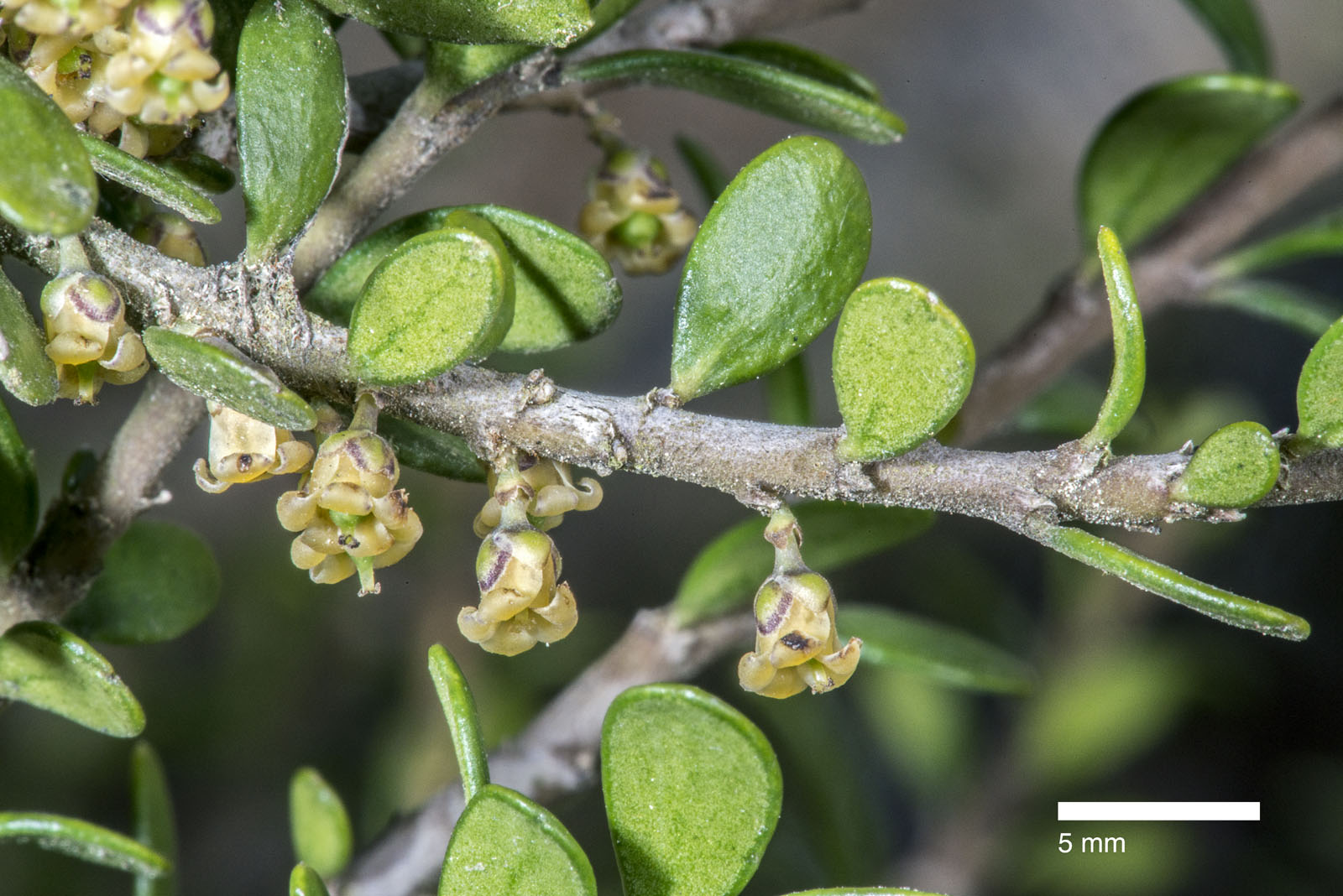
Melicytus alpinus a larval host of A. pessota.

Larvae of this species feed on Melicytus alpinus and Hoare states it is likely that Melicytus micranthus is also a host.
