= Melicytus novae-zelandiae subsp. centurionis =

Scientific classification
- Kingdom: Plantae
- Clade: Tracheophytes
- Clade: Angiosperms
- Clade: Eudicots
- Clade: Rosids
- Order: Malpighiales
- Family: Violaceae
- Genus: Melicytus
- Species: M. novae-zelandiae
- Subspecies: M. n. subsp. centurionis

Trinomial name
- Melicytus novae-zelandiae subsp. centurionis P.S.Green

Subspecies of flowering plant

Melicytus novae-zelandiae subsp. centurionis is a flowering plant in the family Violaceae. It is a subspecies of Melicytus novae-zelandiae, known in New Zealand as coastal mahoe. The subspecific epithet honours the military Captain James Doran McComish (1881–1948), who made several visits in the 1930s to collect plants on Lord Howe Island.

== Description ==
It is a shrub or small tree growing to 5 metres (16 feet) in height. The chartaceous (papery), glabrous, oval leaves are 40–70 mm long, 15–27 mm wide. Clusters of small greenish yellow flowers, 2 mm long, appear from August to October. The round, purple fruits are 6 mm in diameter.

== Distribution and habitat ==
The subspecies is endemic to Australia’s subtropical Lord Howe Island in the Tasman Sea. There it is rare, occurring in forests at intermediate elevations.
