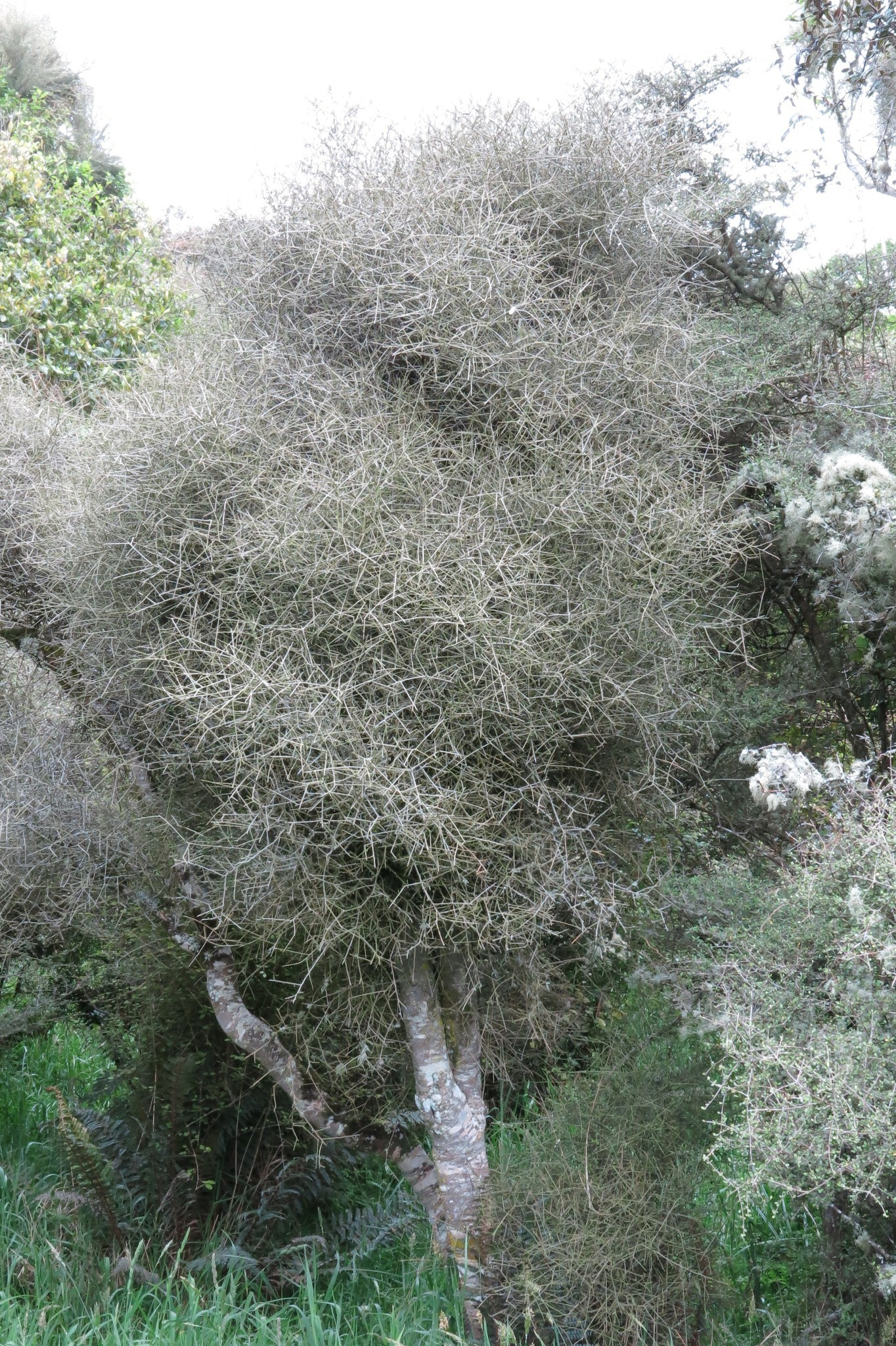
- In Otago, New Zealand

Conservation status
- Near Threatened (IUCN 2.3)

- Nationally Vulnerable (NZ TCS)

Scientific classification
- Kingdom: Plantae
- Clade: Tracheophytes
- Clade: Angiosperms
- Clade: Eudicots
- Clade: Rosids
- Order: Malpighiales
- Family: Violaceae
- Genus: Melicytus
- Species: M. flexuosus

Binomial name
- Melicytus flexuosus B.P.J.Molloy & A.P.Druce

= Melicytus flexuosus =

Species of flowering plant

Melicytus flexuosus is a species of plant in the family Violaceae. It is endemic to New Zealand. It is found in both the North and the South Island.

== Description ==
The plant can grow as tall as 5 metres (16 feet). It is a grey, tangled, branchy shrub. The leaves are normally hidden inside the outer branches. The fruit may be dispersed by lizards.

== Taxonomy ==
This species was formerly placed under Melicytus dentatus. It was described by New Zealand botanists Brian Molloy and Tony Druce.
