= Austramathes coelacantha =

Scientific classification
- Kingdom: Animalia
- Phylum: Arthropoda
- Clade: Pancrustacea
- Class: Insecta
- Order: Lepidoptera
- Superfamily: Noctuoidea
- Family: Noctuidae
- Genus: Austramathes
- Species: A. coelacantha

Binomial name
- Austramathes coelacantha Hoare, 2017

Species of moth

Austramathes coelacantha is a species of moth in the family Noctuidae. It is endemic to New Zealand and is found in the central and east of the South Island. It lives in shrubland in inland areas as well as in Southern beech forest at subalpine altitudes. The life history of this species is unknown as are the host species of its larvae. However the larval host-plants may be species within the genus of Melicytus. Adult moths are on the wing during the months of January to March. They are attracted to light and appear to be active later in the evening, and not at twilight.

== Taxonomy ==
This species was first described by Robert J. B. Hoare in 2017. The male holotype specimen was collected by Troy Watson at Mitchells Cutting in the Upper Clarence Valley in Marlborough. This specimen is held at the New Zealand Arthropod Collection.

== Description ==
The adult male moth has a wingspan of between 24 and 27 mm where as the female moth has a wingspan of between 28 and 30 mm. Hoare states it can be easily distinguished from other species in the genus Austramathes as a result of its "greyish ground-colour, lack of hook-shaped mark from the base of the forewing costa, the large, closely approximated orbicular and reniform stigmata, and the black thorn-like mark from the costa between these."

== Distribution ==
This species is endemic to New Zealand and it inhabits the central and eastern parts of the South Island.

== Habitat ==
This species lives in shrubland in inland areas as well as in Southern beech forest at subalpine altitudes.

== Behaviour ==
Adult moths are on the wing during the months of January to March. They are attracted to light and appear to be active later in the evening, and not at twilight.

== Host-plant ==
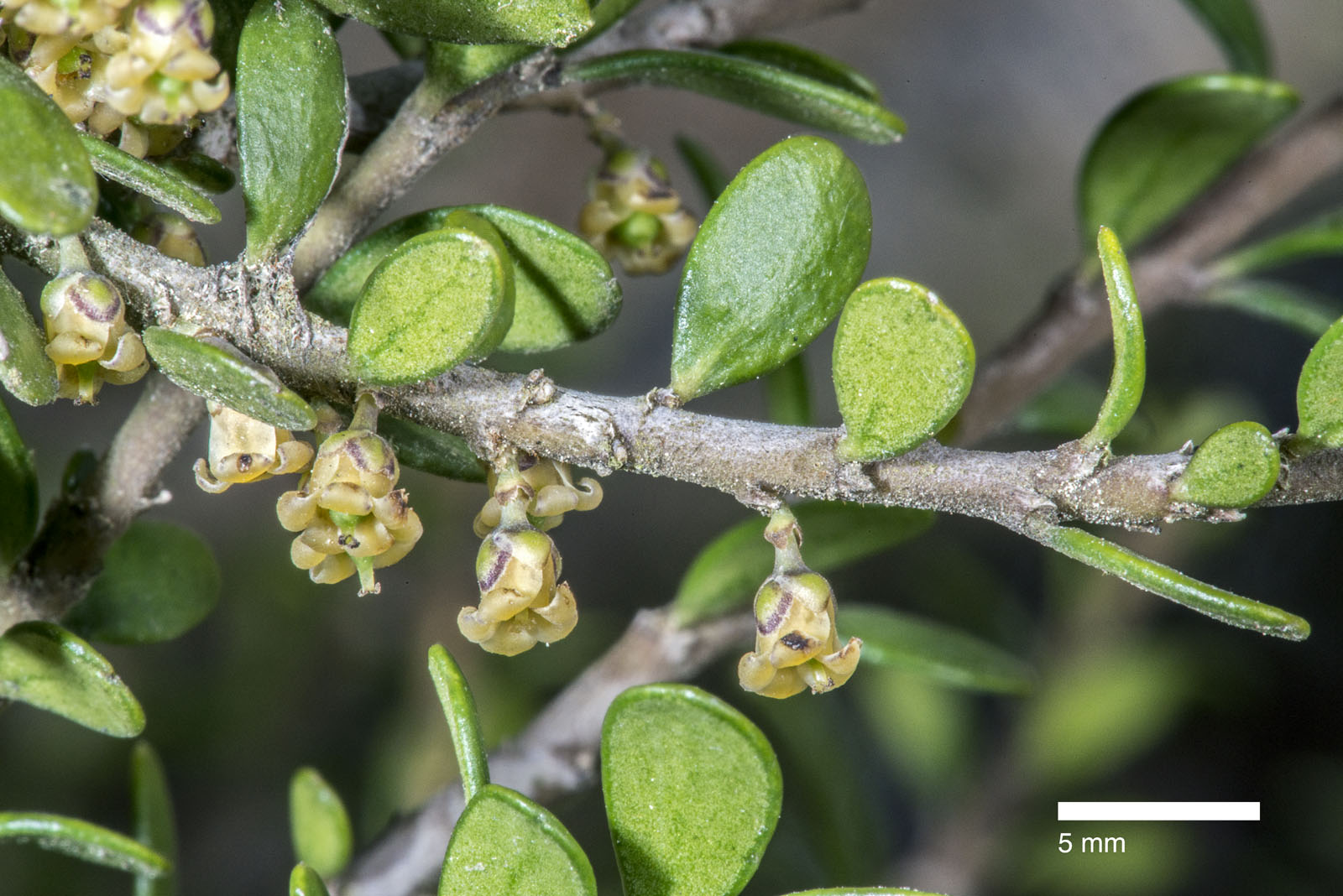
Possible larval host plant, Melicytus alpinus

The life history of this species is unknown as are the host species of its larvae. However Hoare hypothesizes that the host plants of the larvae of A. coelacantha are in the genus Melicytus.
