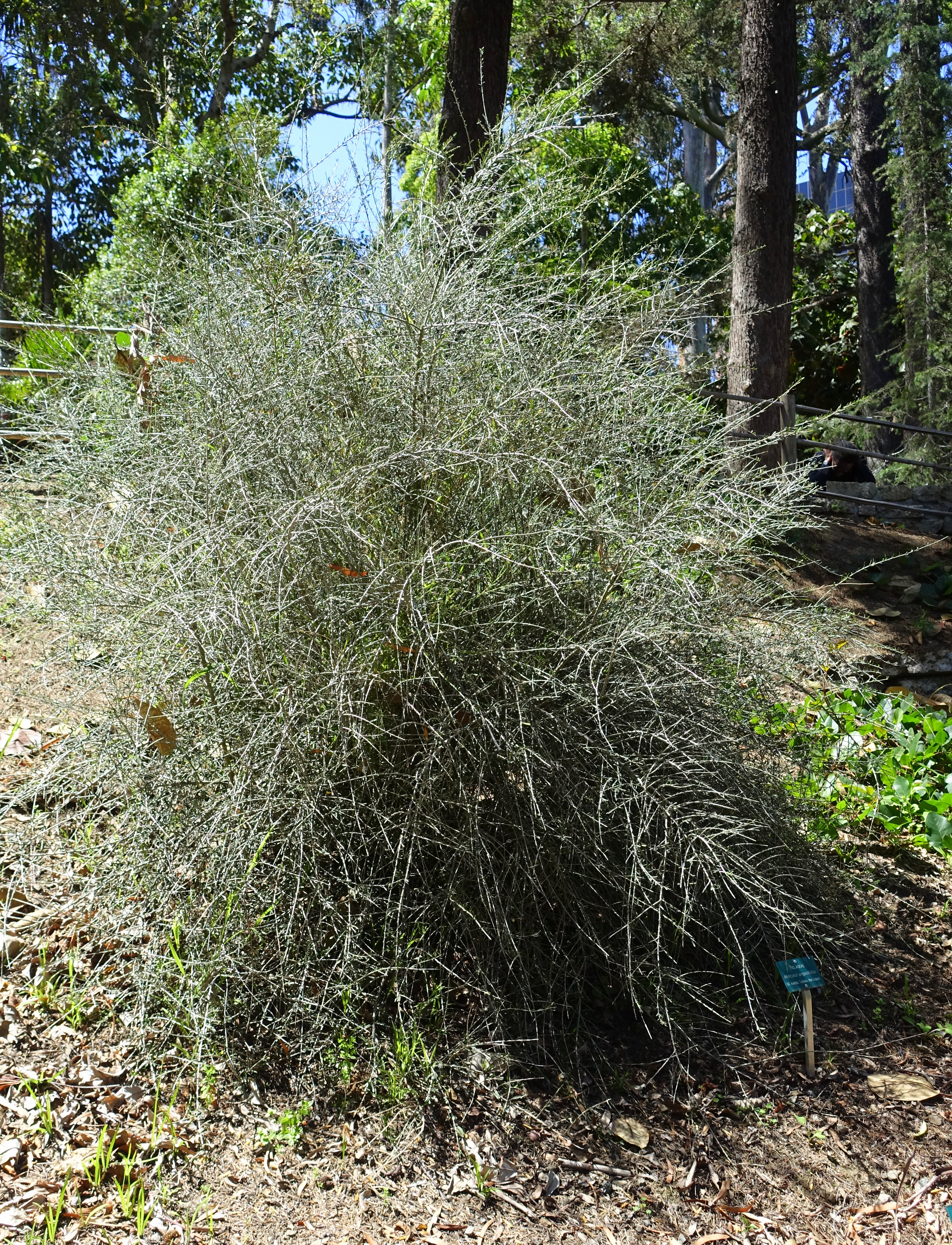
- Melicytus angustifolius

Scientific classification
- Kingdom: Plantae
- Clade: Tracheophytes
- Clade: Angiosperms
- Clade: Eudicots
- Clade: Rosids
- Order: Malpighiales
- Family: Violaceae
- Genus: Melicytus
- Species: M. angustifolius

Binomial name
- Melicytus angustifolius (R. Br. ex DC.) Garn.-Jones

= Melicytus angustifolius =

Species of flowering plant

Melicytus angustifolius is a species of flowering plant in the family Violaceae.
