= Melicytus latifolius =

Conservation status
- Critically endangered (EPBC Act)

Scientific classification
- Kingdom: Plantae
- Clade: Tracheophytes
- Clade: Angiosperms
- Clade: Eudicots
- Clade: Rosids
- Order: Malpighiales
- Family: Violaceae
- Genus: Melicytus
- Species: M. latifolius

Binomial name
- Melicytus latifolius (Endl.) P.S.Green

Synonyms
- Hymenanthera latifolia Endl., 1833; Suttonia tenuifolia Hook.f., 1844

Species of flowering plant in the violet family

Melicytus latifolius, also known as the Norfolk Island mahoe, is a flowering plant in the violet family. It is endemic to the Australian external territory of Norfolk Island in the south-west Pacific Ocean. It was formally described in 1833 by Austrian botanist Stephan Endlicher.

== Taxonomy ==
The Norfolk Island mahoe was formally described in 1833 by Austrian botanist Stephan Endlicher. Its specific epithet is derived from the Latin words meaning "broad-leaved", in reference to its wide leaves.

== Description ==
The Norfolk Island mahoe is a small tree that grows to heights of up to 9 m (30 ft), although it is typically less than 4 m (13 ft) tall. The leaves are usually 5–7 cm (2–3 in) long and 2–3 cm (0.8–1 in). Both the leaves and the stem are hairless. The inflorescences are axillary and have one to four flowers. Pollinated flowers mature into berries that measure around 5 mm (0.2 in) across.

== Distribution and conservation ==
The Norfolk Island mahoe is endemic to Norfolk Island occur in moist upland hardwood forest and plateau hardwood forest, mainly in the Mount Pitt section of the Norfolk Island National Park. Outside the park, it is also known from the Mission Road North area, Steel's Point, and private land adjoining Anson Bay. It is an inhabitant of wide ridges and shady valleys.

The mahoe has a conservation status of Critically Endangered under the Environment Protection and Biodiversity Conservation Act 1999 and is the focus of active conservation efforts by the Australian government. The population of the mahoe has been low for some time; a 1988 survey found 40 plants, few of which had reached maturity. A 2003 search found 17 mature individuals, while a 2012 survey found only 16 plants. More recent searches have documented an increase in the mahoe's numbers, with the population estimated to be 148 plants in 2021. The government aims to increase the population of the species to 500 individuals by 2034.

Currently, the mahoe is mainly threatened by the spread of invasive weeds that outcompete it, such as red guava (Psidium cattleyanum) and wild tobacco (Solanum mauritianum). It is also threatened by infections of Phytophthora cinnamomi. Poor seed production represents another threat, as the last good fruiting season for the plant took place in late 1990s or early 2000s.
