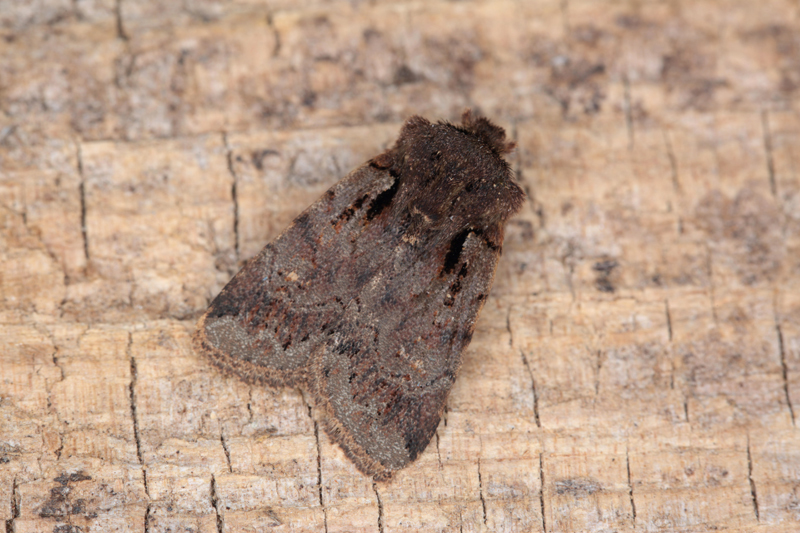

Scientific classification
- Kingdom: Animalia
- Phylum: Arthropoda
- Class: Insecta
- Order: Lepidoptera
- Superfamily: Noctuoidea
- Family: Noctuidae
- Genus: Austramathes
- Species: A. squaliolus

Binomial name
- Austramathes squaliolus Hoare, 2017

= Austramathes squaliolus =

Species of moth

Austramathes squaliolus is a species of moth in the family Noctuidae. It is endemic to New Zealand and is found only in the Chatham Islands on the Chatham, Pitt, Little Mangere and Rangatira Islands. The larvae of A. squaliolus is similarly patterned to the larvae of A. fortis and have lateral yellow markings that contrast with the dark dorsal marbling. However this marbling is darker in A. squaliolus in comparison to the lighter coloured A. fortis. Melicytus chathamicus is the larval host-plant for this species. The adult moth is again very similar in appearance to A. fortis and, as with A. fortis, the black line curved at the forewing base is the distinguishing feature. However the two species are unlikely to be confused as their ranges do not overlap. The adult moths are on the wing in November and December and have been observed flying at dusk.

== Taxonomy ==
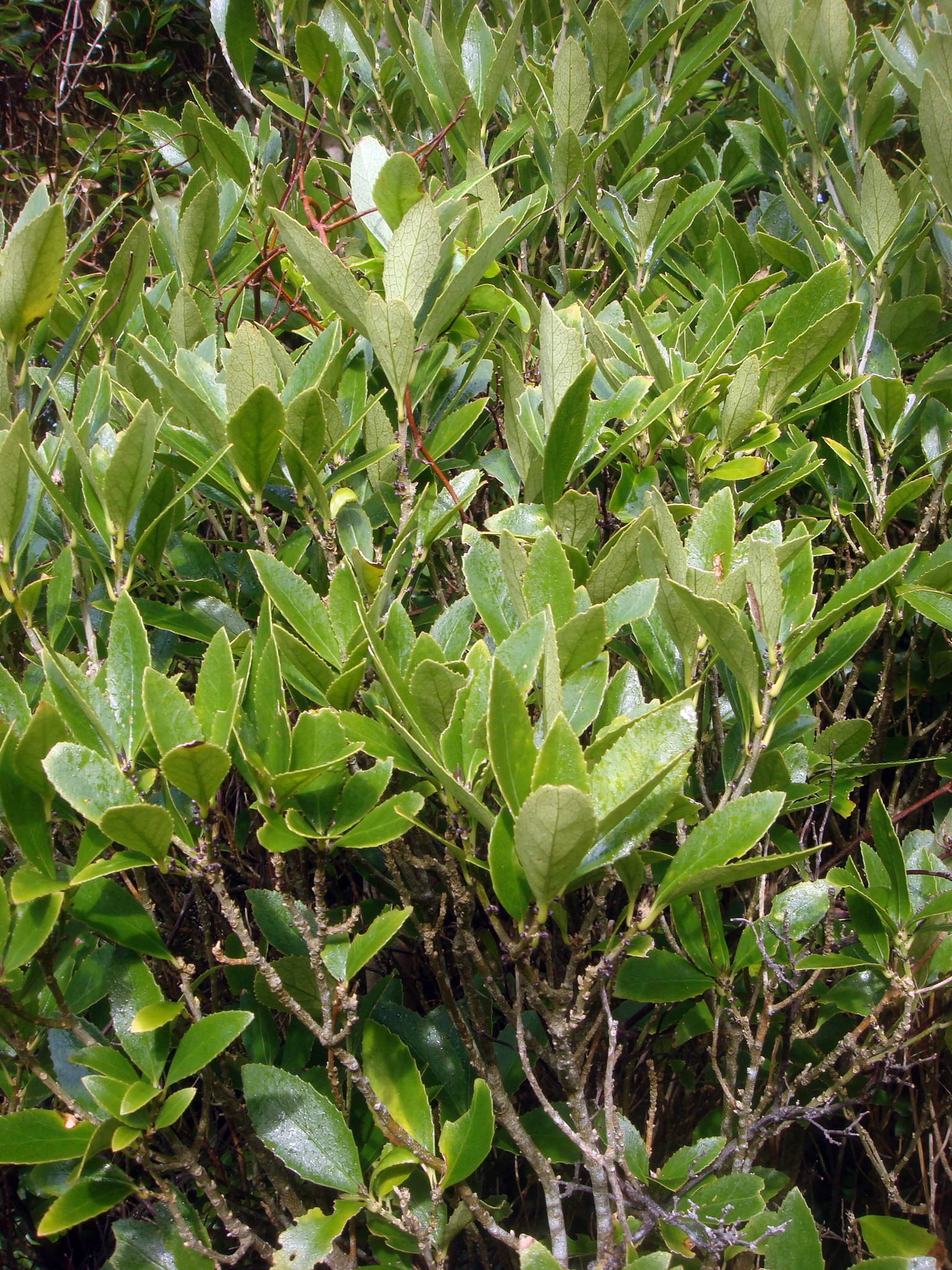
Larval host plant, Melicytus chathamicus

It was first described by Robert J. B. Hoare in 2017. The male holotype was collected by George William Gibbs as a larva on Rangatira Island and raised to adulthood. The specimen is held in the New Zealand Arthropod Collection.

== Description ==
The larvae of this species are bright coloured. They are similarly patterned to the larvae of A. fortis and have lateral yellow markings that contrast with the dark dorsal marbling. This marbling is darker in this species in comparison to the lighter A. fortis.

The adult moth has a wingspan of between 25–31 mm. In appearance the adult moth is again very similar to A. fortis and, as with A. fortis, the black line curved at the forewing base is the distinguishing feature. The genitalia of the male of A. squaliolus differs from that of A. fortis. The two species are unlikely to be confused as their ranges do not overlap.

== Distribution ==
This species is endemic to the Chatham Islands and is fairly common. It has been found on the following islands: Chatham, Pitt, Little Mangere and Rangatira.

== Behaviour ==
Adult moths are on the wing in the months of November and December. Adults have been observed flying at dusk in the vicinity of their larval host-plant.

== Host-plant ==
Melicytus chathamicus is the host plant for the larvae of this species.
