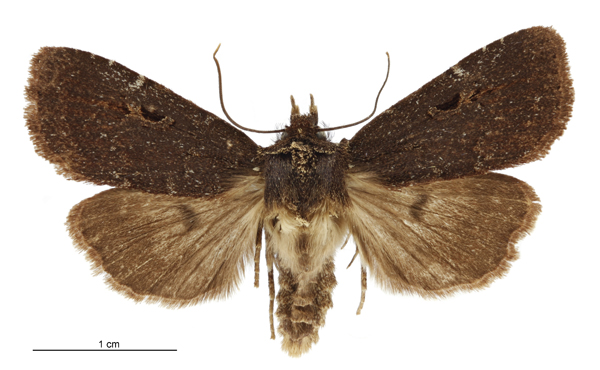
- Male

Scientific classification
- Kingdom: Animalia
- Phylum: Arthropoda
- Class: Insecta
- Order: Lepidoptera
- Superfamily: Noctuoidea
- Family: Noctuidae
- Genus: Austramathes
- Species: A. purpurea

Binomial name
- Austramathes purpurea (Butler, 1879)

Synonyms
- Graphiphora purpurea Butler, 1879; Xanthia ceramodes Meyrick 1887; Xanthia purpurea (Butler, 1879)

= Austramathes purpurea =

Species of moth endemic to New Zealand

Austramathes purpurea is a species of moth in the family Noctuidae. It is endemic to New Zealand and can be found throughout the North and South Islands but has yet to be recorded at Stewart Island. It inhabits native forest. This species might possibly be confused with A. pessota, however this latter species does not have the purple hue to the forewings. The larvae of A. purpurea feed primarily on māhoe but have been recorded as feeding on, and have been reared on, narrow-leaved māhoe. The larvae pupate in a silken cocoon on moss covered ground. Adults can be found on the wing during the months of March to January but mainly occur during New Zealand's late autumn, winter, and spring. Light trapping may not be the most efficient technique for collecting this species.

== Taxonomy ==
This species was first described by Arthur Gardiner Butler in 1879 and named Graphiphora purpurea. In 1887 Edward Meyrick, thinking he was describing a new species, again named this moth Xanthia ceramodes. Having realised his error, in 1888 Meyrick synonymised this name but placed the species within the Xanthia genus. In 1906 George Hampson described the new genus Austramathes and placed this species within it so it is now known as Austramathes purpurea. In 2017 Robert Hoare undertook revision of the New Zealand Noctuinae and confirmed this placement. The male holotype specimen was collected by F. W. Hutton in Dunedin and is held at the Natural History Museum, London.

== Description ==
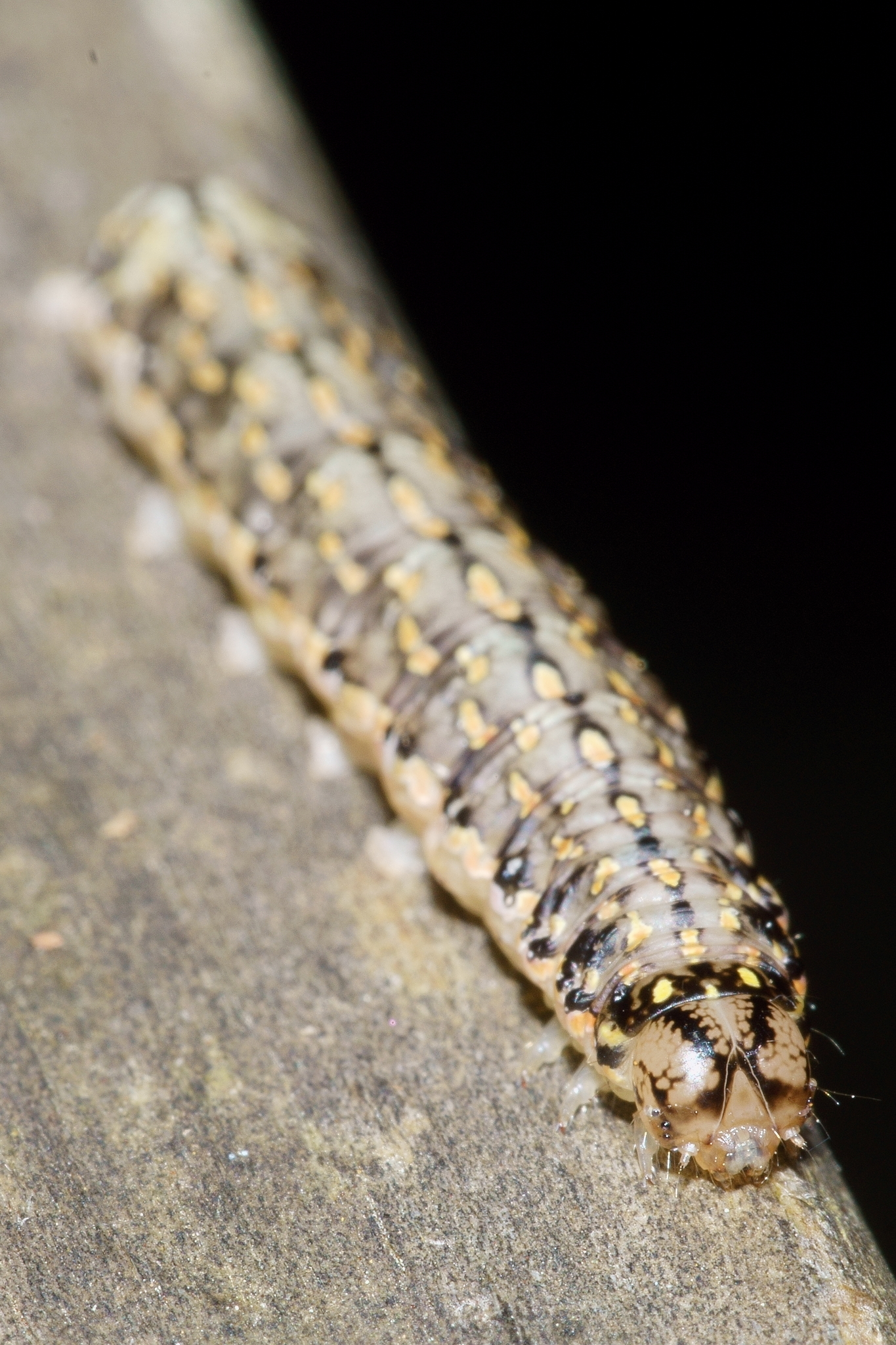
Larva of A. purpurea

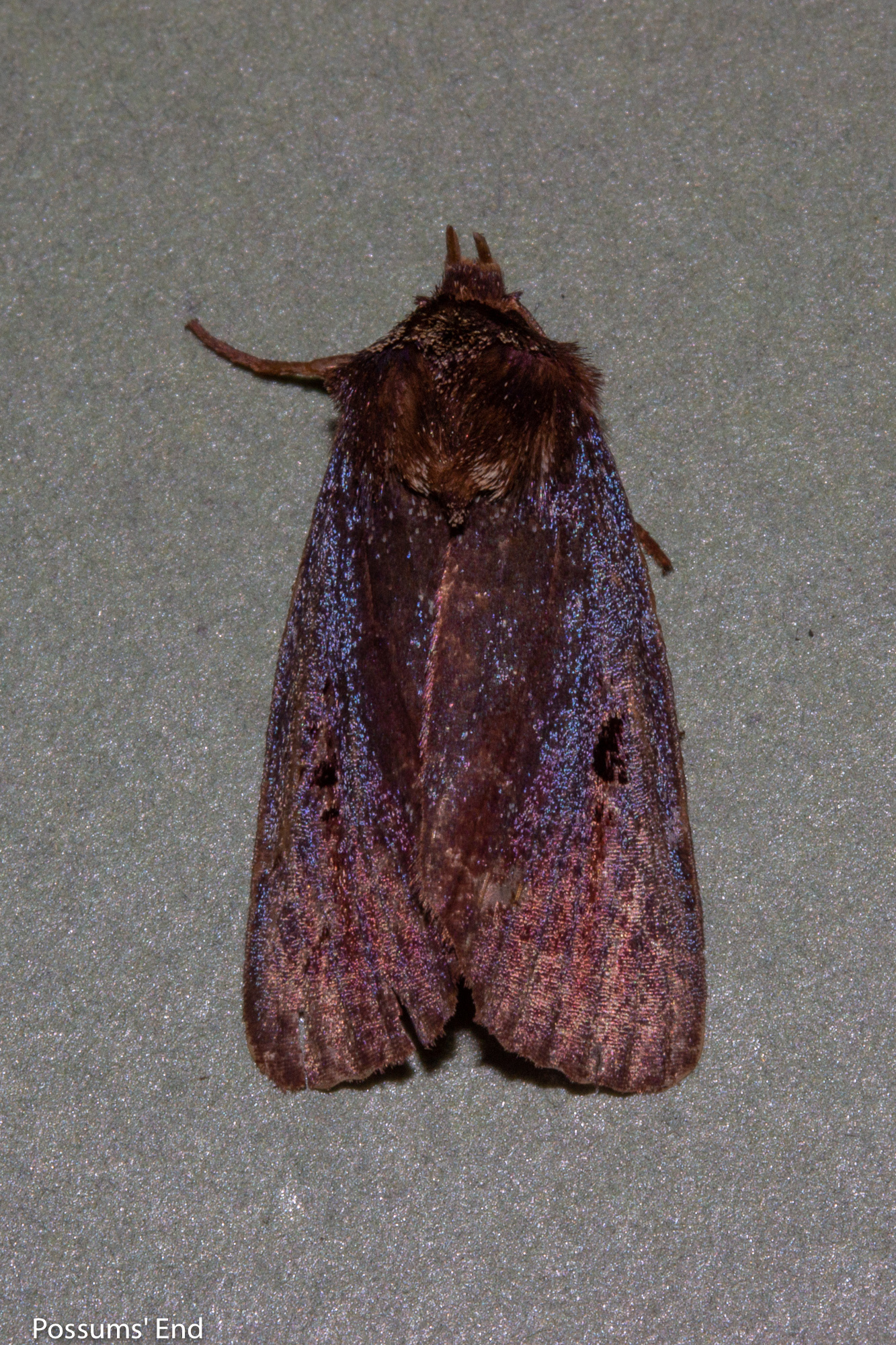
A. purpurea showing the distinctive purplish hue to the forewings.

The larvae of this species are green with orange, black, yellow and pink markings. George Hudson described it as follows:

The full-grown larva is about 1 1/4 inches long, moderately stout and of uniform thickness. The head is ochreous, with a black stripe on each side; the back of the larva is greyish-green, and the under surface pale greenish-ochreous;, there is a rather large, shining black mark above each spiracle; the dorsal, sub-dorsal and lateral lines are orange-yellow and very conspicuous, the two upper lines being very much broken; there are several minute black warts below the spiracles, and a series of very small black marks on the orange dorsal line.

Butler originally described this species as follows:

Primaries above rich chocolate-brown shot with purple; the central area limited by two undulated squamose lines of white and fulvous scales, a third similar but less distinct line across the base; a semicircular blackish spot edged with whitish near the end of the cell, its outer edge, together with a portion of the outer undulated line, indicating the reniform spot, its inner edge united at the extremity to an oblique black-edged whitish dash which replaces the orbicular spot; an indistinct series of black marginal dots; secondaries chocolate-brown becoming pale brown towards the base; fringe pale brown intersected by a darker line; head, collar, and centre of thorax rich chocolate-brown edged with fulvous scales; first joint of palpi tipped with fulvous; tegulae dark brown with a sericeous slaty-grey lustre; abdomen chocolate-brown with pale basal tufts; under surface pale sericeous red-brown with darker margins and fringe; primaries with whitish interno-basal area; secondaries with a lunule at the end of the cell and a bisinuated discal series of spots black; body below darker than the wings, chocolate-brown. Expanse of wings 1 inch 7 lines.

Hudson also described the species in his 1898 book New Zealand moths and butterflies (Macro-lepidoptera) as:

The expansion of the wings is 1 1/2 inches. The forewings are rich, glossy reddish-brown with several scattered whitish scales; there is a distinct yellow mark on the costa at about one-fourth, forming the beginning of a broken transverse line; the orbicular is small, round and yellowish; the reniform is small, crescentic and yellowish, the space between the orbicular and the reniform is very dark blackish-brown; beyond the reniform there is a conspicuous white mark on the costa forming the beginning of a second broken transverse line; a third shaded line is situated near the termen. The hind-wings are pale brown with a dark spot in the middle, very conspicuous on the under surface.

The wingspan of the adult male A. purpurea is between 29 and 37mm where as the wingspan of the female is between 29 and 42mm. This species might possibly be confused with A. pessota, however this latter species does not have the purple hue to the forewings.

== Distribution ==
A. purpurea is endemic to New Zealand, and found in both the North and the South Islands but has yet to be recorded at Stewart Island.

== Habitat ==
This species prefers native forest as its habitat.

== Behaviour ==
The larvae of this species pupate in a silken cocoon on moss covered ground or alternatively within gaps in bark. Adults can be found on the wing during the months of March to January but mainly occur during New Zealand's late autumn, winter and spring.

== Host species ==
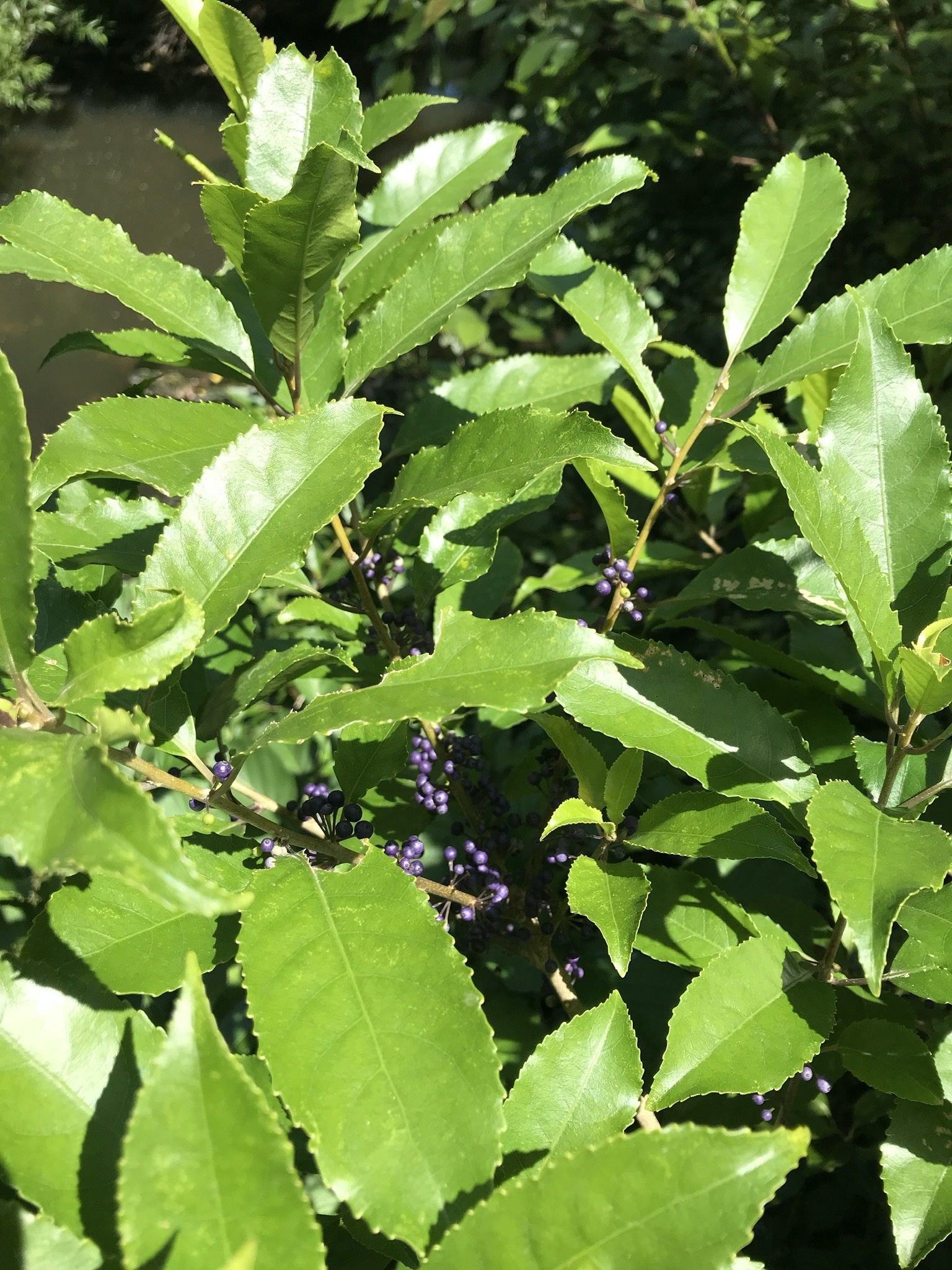
Māhoe, the larval host of A. purpurea.

The larvae of A. purpurea feed primarily on māhoe but have been recorded as feeding on, and have also been reared on, narrow-leaved māhoe.

== Collection method ==
Although the adults of this species are nocturnal and are attracted to light, Robert Hoare has hypothesised that light trapping may not be the most efficient technique for collecting this species.
