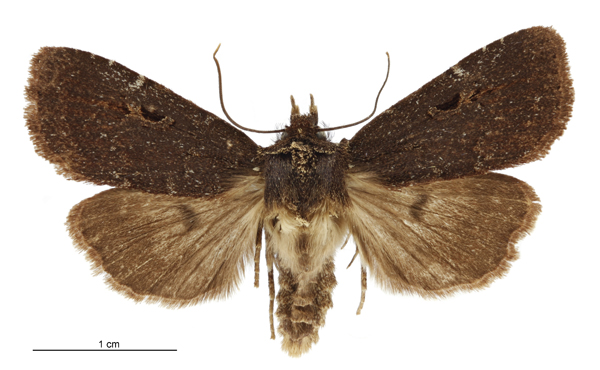
- Austramathes purpurea

Scientific classification
- Kingdom: Animalia
- Phylum: Arthropoda
- Class: Insecta
- Order: Lepidoptera
- Superfamily: Noctuoidea
- Family: Noctuidae
- Subfamily: Cuculliinae
- Genus: Austramathes; Hampson, 1906

= Austramathes =

Genus of moths

Austramathes is a genus of moths of the family Noctuidae. It is endemic to New Zealand.

== Species ==
The following species are found within the genus:

- Austramathes purpurea
- Austramathes fortis
- Austramathes squaliolus
- Austramathes coelacantha
- Austramathes pessota
