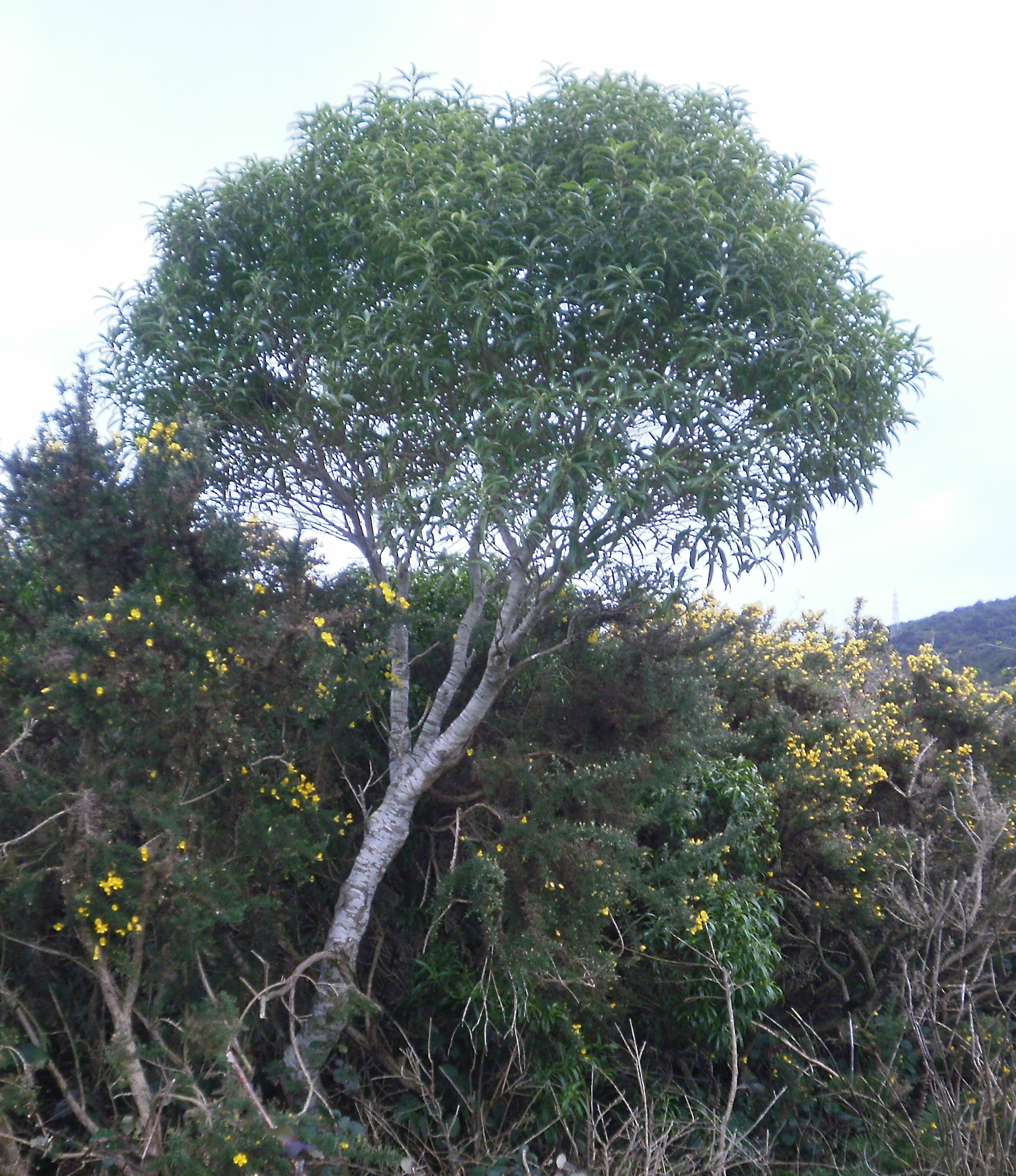

Conservation status
- Not Threatened (NZ TCS)

Scientific classification
- Kingdom: Plantae
- Clade: Tracheophytes
- Clade: Angiosperms
- Clade: Eudicots
- Clade: Rosids
- Order: Malpighiales
- Family: Violaceae
- Genus: Melicytus
- Species: M. lanceolatus

Binomial name
- Melicytus lanceolatus Hook.f.

= Melicytus lanceolatus =

Species of tree

Melicytus lanceolatus, commonly called narrow-leaved māhoe or māhoe-wao, is a small tree in the family Violaceae that is endemic to New Zealand.

== Description ==
Melicytus lanceolatus is a small tree that typically appears slender, glabrous, and erect. Melicytus lanceolatus has the potential to grow up to 5–6 m tall with a trunk 30 cm in diameter.

The vibrant green leaves of M. lanceolatus are simple, alternate, and have a finely serrated margin. They are lanceolate in shape, being long, thin, and narrow. Typically, the leaves are 5–16 cm long by 0.5–2 cm wide. Occasionally, the tip of the leaf will curve downward. Overall, these features can make the leaves of M. lanceolatus look a lot like willow leaves.

Bark is brown to white, slightly wrinkled, and with prominent lenticels. Branches are brittle.

Flowers are small, 5 mm in diameter, and have five erect petals that curve backwards. Petal colours are variable, with some being yellow, dark purple, or with hints of both. Flowers occur in clusters of two to five. They grow along bare branches below leaves but occasionally from the leaf axils. These clusters can be in such high quantity that they densely cover the branch in small flowers. Flowers are scented, being fragrant day and night.

Melicytus lanceolatus produces dark purple round berries that are 4–6 mm in diameter. There is some discrepancy about the number of seeds in each berry, with some claiming between three and six seeds or six to twelve seeds.

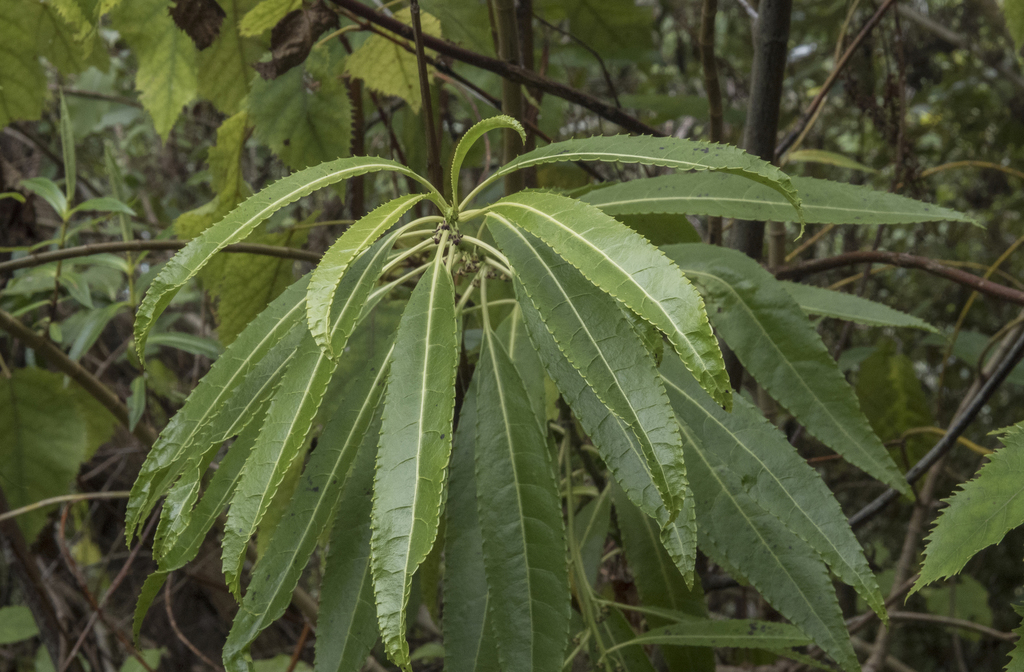
Leaves of Melicytus lanceolatus

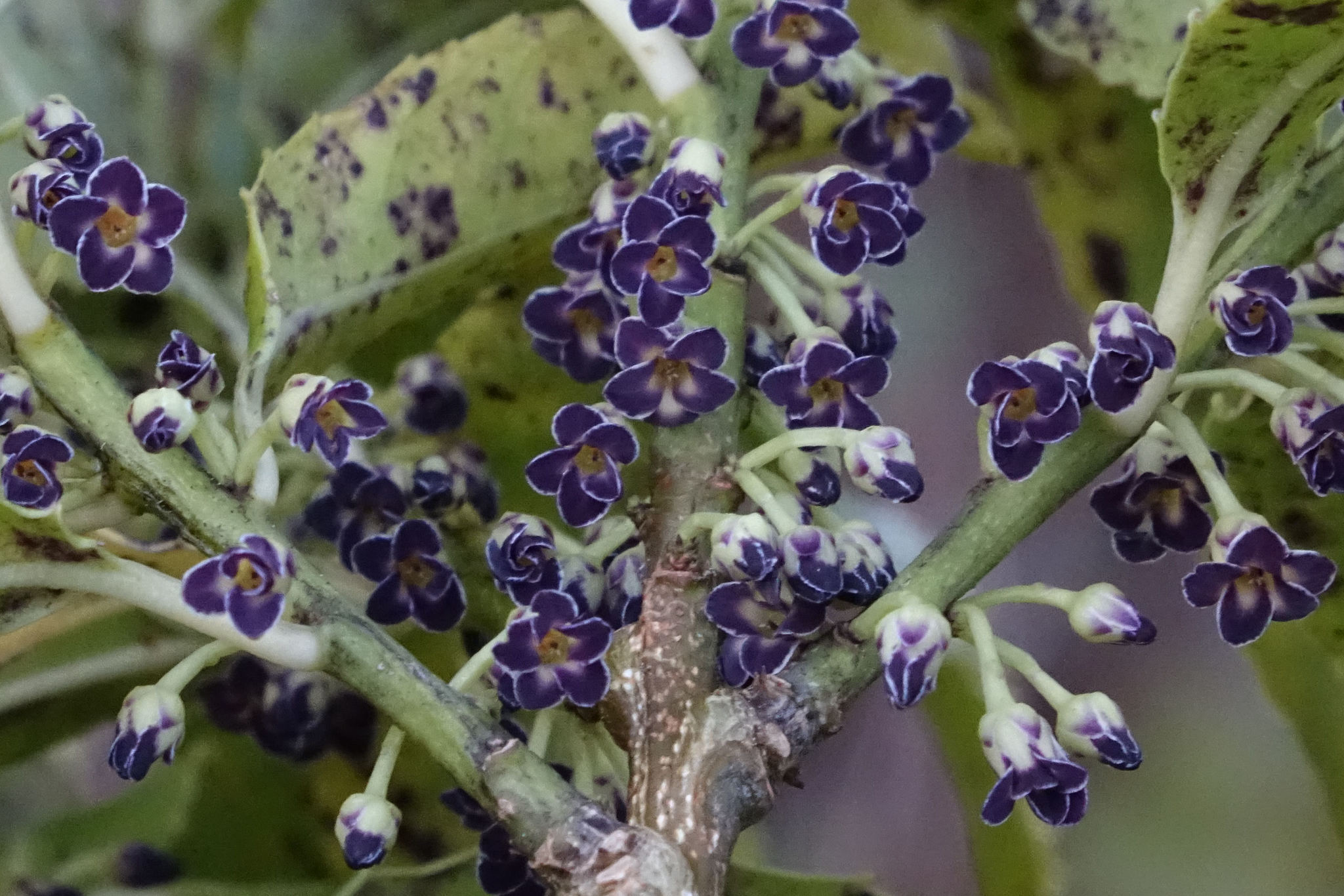
Melicytus lanceolatus flowering in September

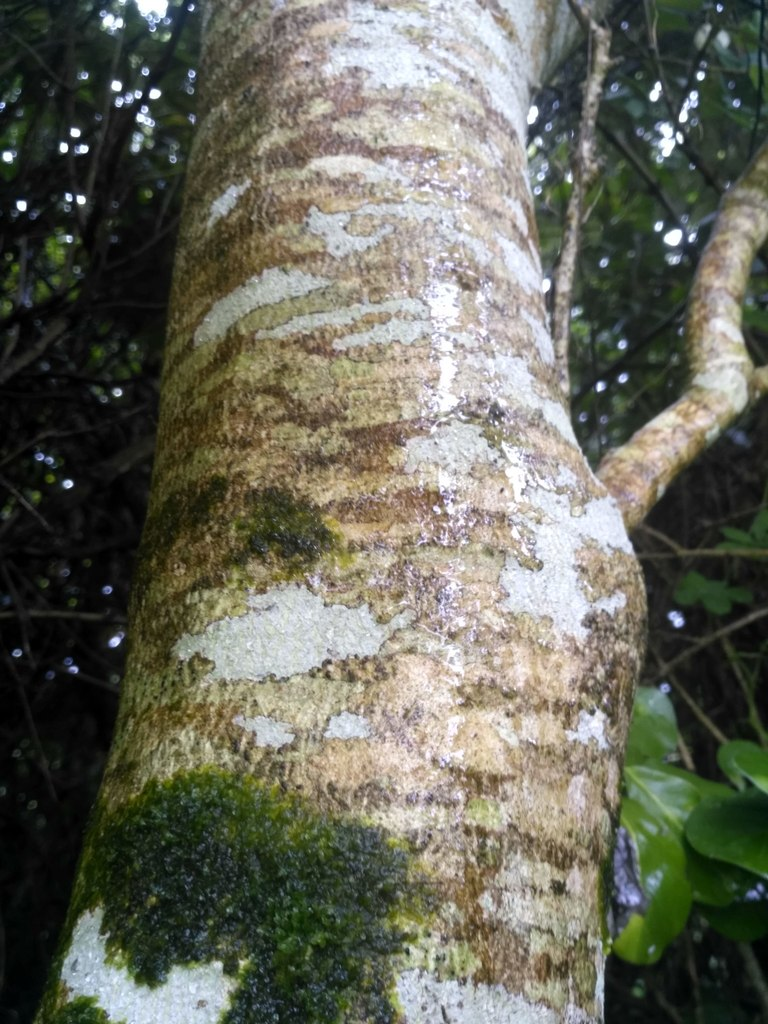
Trunk of Melicytus lanceolatus

== Range ==
=== Natural global range ===
Melicytus lanceolatus is endemic to New Zealand.

=== New Zealand range ===
Melicytus lanceolatus is found in the North Island, South Island and Stewart Island, from a latitude of 35°30S (Northland region) southwards from sea level to 915 m. In the South Island, it is mostly found around Dunedin, in Southland, and west of the Southern Alps. Although M. lanceolatus occurs on Stewart Island, it is not very common.

== Habitat ==
This species prefers moist, cool areas with high rainfall from lowland up to montane forests. It is tolerant of a range of soils except dry soils. Since it prefers cool areas, M. lanceolatus has a cold sensitivity of –2.0 °C, but its leaves were found to endure frosts down to –8.3 °C. Melicytus lanceolatus is an early coloniser after a disturbance. It can be commonly seen growing along forest margins, in regenerating forest, or as a slightly shaded understory plant. Since it can be an understory plant, it can tolerate shade. However, it does require enough light to germinate, as seeds were found to have a very low germination rate (8%) in the dark. Specifically, M. lanceolatus can be found in associations with red beech, silver beech, kāmahi, and tōtara forests. It can also occur in shrublands, river terraces, inland valleys or frosty basins.

== Ecology ==
=== Phenology ===
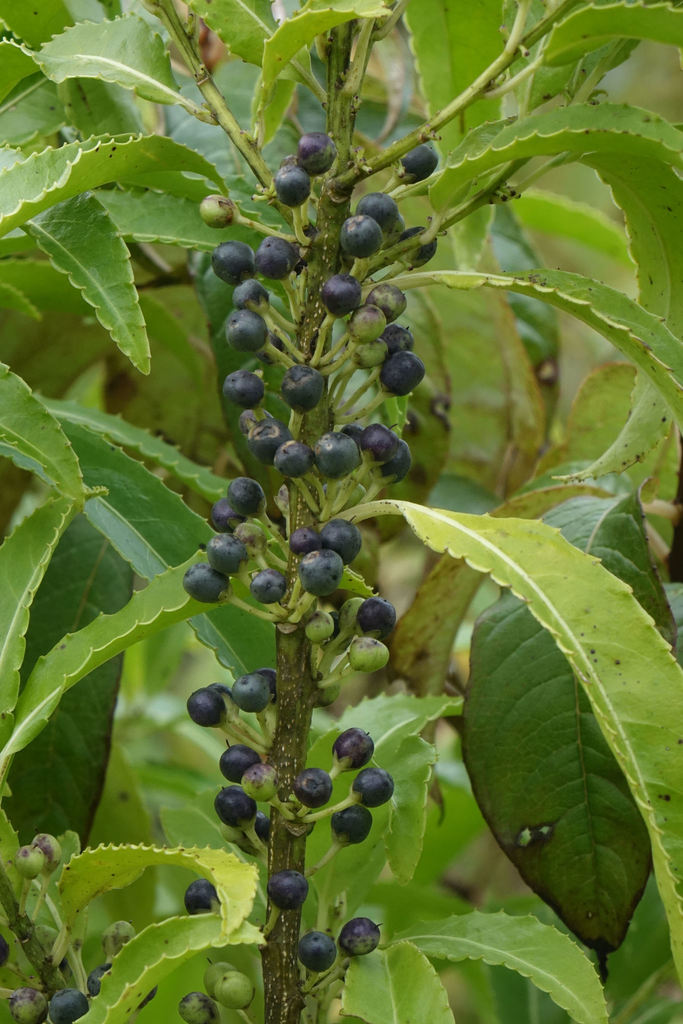
Purple berries of Melicytus lanceolatus in March

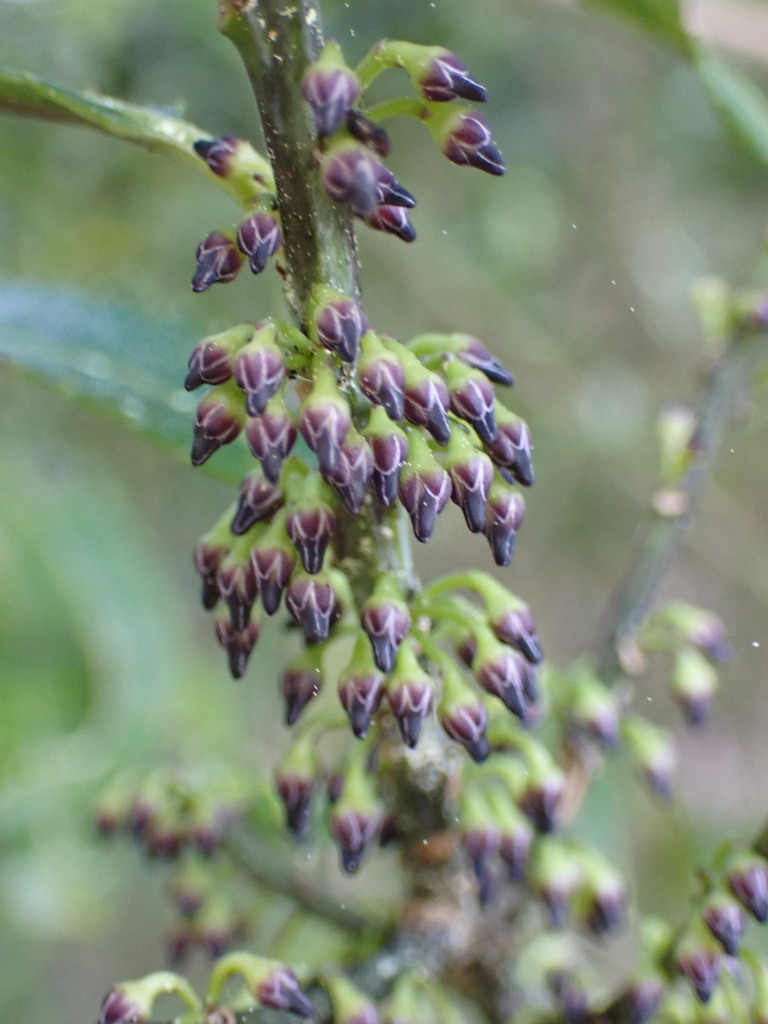
Flower buds of Melicytus lanceolatus in August

Melicytus lanceolatus is a long-lived, dioecious plant. Flowering occurs from June to November (mid-winter or early spring to early summer) while fruiting occurs from July to February (late-winter to late-summer). Most fruits start to ripen from March to April. Insects are the primary pollinators of its flowers while frugivorous birds allow for seed dispersal. The seeds of M. lanceolatus were found to germinate after a two-month delay, often germinating in autumn or winter. Seeds could also remain viable in soil for up to thirty months.

=== Predators, Parasites, and Diseases ===
Due to its berries, flowers, and foliage, M. lanceolatus has interactions with insects, birds and introduced mammalian species.

Flies that have been caught visiting the flowers include fungus gnats from the family Sciaridae and Mycetophilidae, midges from the family Chironomidae, and hover flies, specifically the large hover fly.

Bees, as seen with the western honey bee, use the flowers as a pollen and nectar source.

Species of moth are also associated with M. lanceolatus. Pyrgotis plagiatana has been observed visiting its flowers. Austramathes purpurea caterpillars use this species as a host plant by feeding on its leaves. The caterpillars of the puriri moth use the tree as a host plant by burrowing into its trunk and eating the callus tissue produced. One of the indigenous names (although less commonly used) for M. lanceolatus, “Kaiwētā” (meaning “wētā food” in te reo Māori), suggests that wētā will also eat this plant. However, this could be in reference to the fact that wētā (specifically the tree wētā) live in holes made by the puriri moth, making it appear as though wētā eat trees like M. lanceolatus.

Bemisia flocculosa, also known as the Melicytus whitefly, use M. lanceolatus as a host plant by feeding on the underside of its leaves. This interaction occurs with other Melicytus species, hence the common name.

Thrips from the family Lathriidae have been caught visiting its flowers, while larvae from the species Hercinothrips bicinctus have been found infesting its leaves.

Melicytus lanceolatus is an attractive food source for birds. For example, New Zealand bellbirds eat the berries, while kererū eat the foliage, flowers, flower buds, and berries.

Introduced mammals such as red deer, fallow deer, white-tailed deer, and feral goats, also eat the foliage of M. lanceolatus.

== Evolution ==
Melicytus lanceolatus has been described as one of the oldest Melicytus species. It was estimated to have diverged around 6.41 million years ago.

== Etymology ==
The genus name Melicytus is derived from the Greek words μέλι (méli), meaning "honey," and κῠ́τος (kútos), meaning "hollow container." Combined, this literally means “honey cave,” referencing the nectaries below the stamens.

The species name lanceolatus is a Latin word meaning “shaped like a lance,” referencing the lanceolate leaves of M. lanceolatus.

== Chromosome number ==
The chromosome number of M. lanceolatus is 2n = 32.
