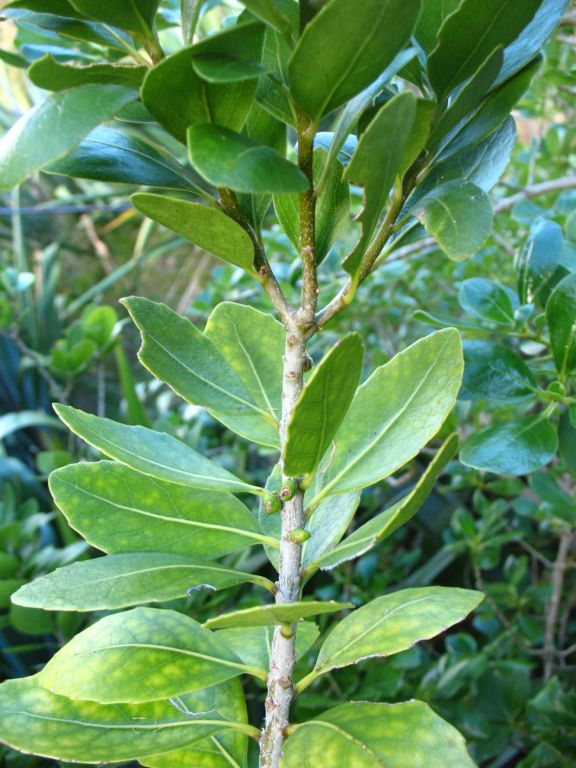

Scientific classification
- Kingdom: Plantae
- Clade: Tracheophytes
- Clade: Angiosperms
- Clade: Eudicots
- Clade: Rosids
- Order: Malpighiales
- Family: Violaceae
- Genus: Melicytus
- Species: M. novae-zelandiae

Binomial name
- Melicytus novae-zelandiae A.Cunn. (1838)

= Melicytus novae-zelandiae =

Species of flowering plant

Melicytus novae-zelandiae, commonly known as coastal mahoe, is a flowering plant in the violet family. It grows along the coast of New Zealand from the Bay of Plenty northwards, especially on offshore islands. Its range is largely restricted to New Zealand, though one subspecies is endemic to Australia's Lord Howe Island. The specific epithet refers to its principal area of occurrence.

Subspecies include:

- Melicytus novae-zelandiae subsp. novae-zelandiae (A.Cunn.) P.S.Green (1970) — New Zealand
- Melicytus novae-zelandiae subsp. centurionis P.S.Green (1970) — Lord Howe Island

== Description ==
It is a small, multistemmed dioecious shrub growing up to 2 m in height. It produces small, yellowish green, bell-shaped flowers in August and September, and purple-spotted, white-shaded berries from late August to October.
