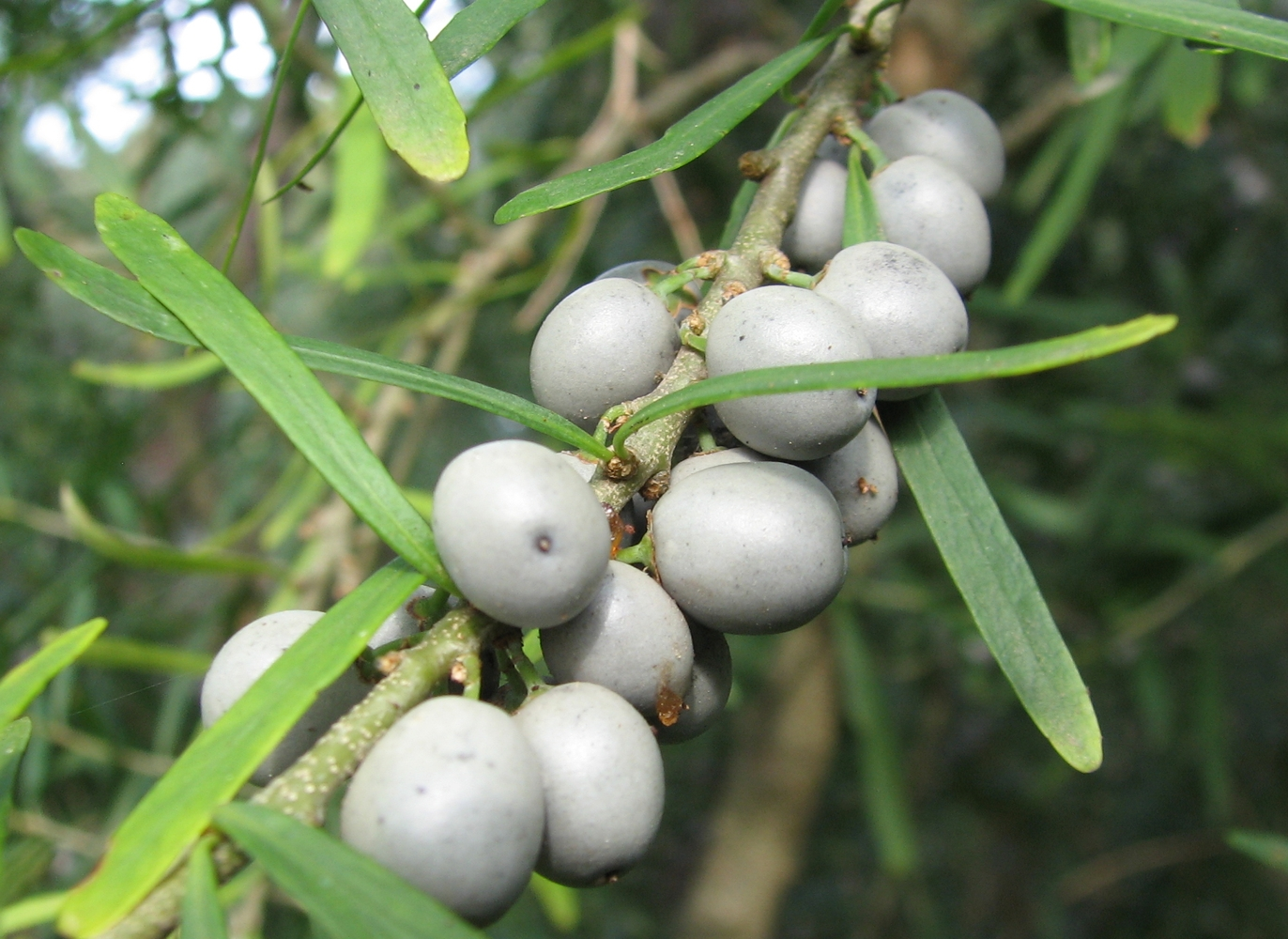

Scientific classification
- Kingdom: Plantae
- Clade: Tracheophytes
- Clade: Angiosperms
- Clade: Eudicots
- Clade: Rosids
- Order: Malpighiales
- Family: Violaceae
- Genus: Melicytus
- Species: M. dentatus

Binomial name
- Melicytus dentatus (R.Br. ex DC.) Molloy & Mabb.

Synonyms
- Hymenanthera angustifolia DC. Hymenanthera banksii F.Muell; Hymenanthera banksii var. angustifolia Stirling; Hymenanthera dentata R.Br. ex DC; Hymenanthera dentata var. angustifolia (DC.) Benth. Hymenanthera dentata DC. var. dentata Hymenanthera sp. aff. dentata (East Gippsland variant); Melicytus sp. aff. dentatus (East Gippsland variant); Melicytus angustifolius (DC.) Garn.-Jones

= Melicytus dentatus =

Tree violet

Species of plant

Melicytus dentatus, the tree violet, is a shrub that is native to south-east Australia. It grows up to 4 metres high and has branchlets that are often armed with spines and have leaves that are 5 to 50 mm long and sometimes toothed. The flowers appear in spring and summer and are pale yellow, 3 to 5 mm in length, and have petals that are recurved at the tips. These are followed by pale green to purple-black, rounded berries which are 4 to 5 mm in diameter.

The berries are consumed by Cunningham's spiny-tailed skinks.

The species occurs in New South Wales, Victoria, Tasmania and South Australia.
