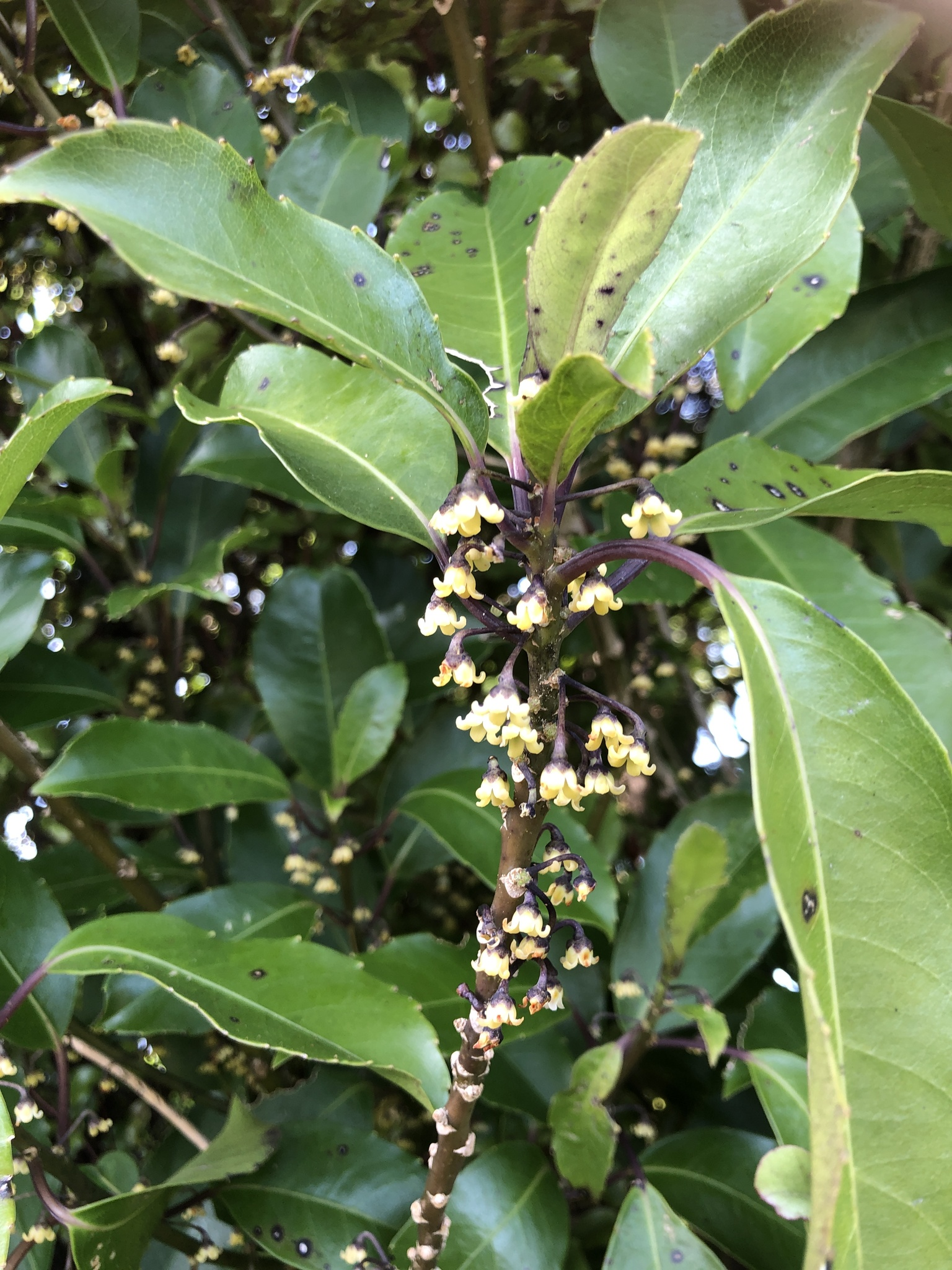

Scientific classification
- Kingdom: Plantae
- Clade: Tracheophytes
- Clade: Angiosperms
- Clade: Eudicots
- Clade: Rosids
- Order: Malpighiales
- Family: Violaceae
- Genus: Melicytus
- Species: M. macrophyllus

Binomial name
- Melicytus macrophyllus A.Cunn.

= Melicytus macrophyllus =

Large-leaved māhoe

Species of tree

Melicytus macrophyllus, the large-leaved māhoe, is a small tree up to 6 metres (20 feet) tall, of the family Violaceae. It is endemic to New Zealand.

Large-leaved māhoe is found from Kaitaia to the Waitākere Ranges in the North Island. It is similar to M. ramiflorus but is generally smaller, with larger leaves which are often toothed on the upper half. Early spring flowers are borne on long stalks and are usually greenish yellow. The fruits always contain 4 to 6 seeds and are coloured white through to dark purple.
