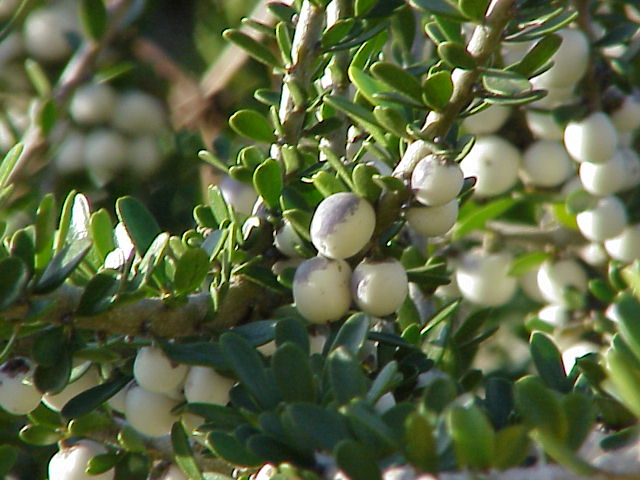

Scientific classification
- Kingdom: Plantae
- Clade: Tracheophytes
- Clade: Angiosperms
- Clade: Eudicots
- Clade: Rosids
- Order: Malpighiales
- Family: Violaceae
- Genus: Melicytus
- Species: M. crassifolius

Binomial name
- Melicytus crassifolius (Hook.f.) F.Muell.

= Melicytus crassifolius =

Thick-leaved mahoe

Species of flowering plant

Melicytus crassifolius (thick-leaved mahoe; syn. Hymenanthera crassifolia Hook.f.) is an ornamental plant in the Violaceae family, which is native to New Zealand.
