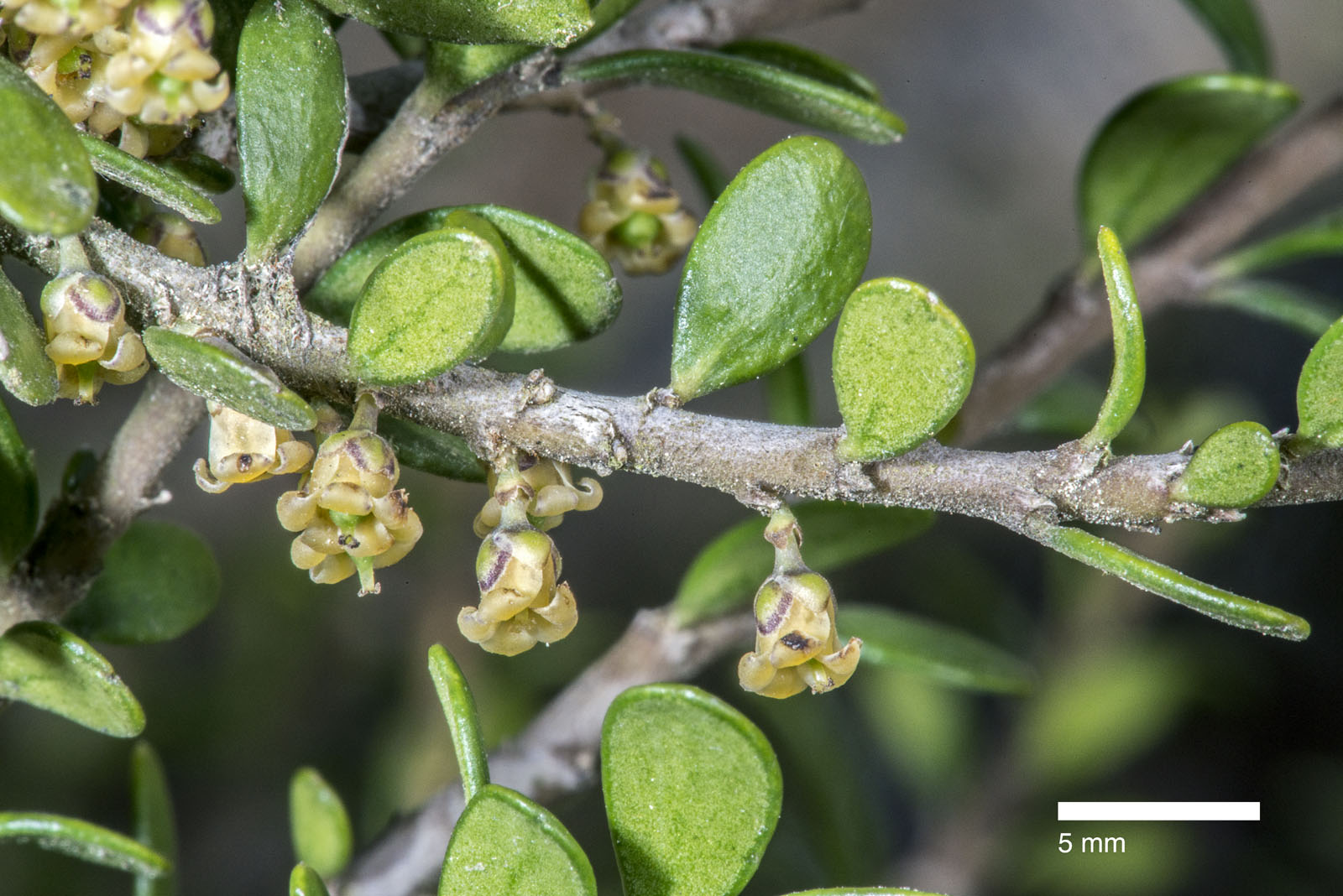
- Melicytus aff. alpinus (Kirk) Garn.-Jones

Scientific classification
- Kingdom: Plantae
- Clade: Tracheophytes
- Clade: Angiosperms
- Clade: Eudicots
- Clade: Rosids
- Order: Malpighiales
- Family: Violaceae
- Genus: Melicytus
- Species: M. alpinus

Binomial name
- Melicytus alpinus (Kirk) Garn.-Jones

= Melicytus alpinus =

Species of shrub

Melicytus alpinus, the mahoe porcupine shrub, is a small shrub of the family Violaceae endemic to New Zealand.

== Description ==
Melicytus alpinus get their common name, porcupine shrub, from the long, almost leafless, spindly branches which resemble the quills of a porcupine. Its leaves are narrow and generally have smooth margins with a few exceptions with serrated edges, however, they do only have a small amount of leaves and they are only approximately 1 cm long. Hard and dense, slow-growing in coastal or alpine areas of southern North Island and the South Island. It looks almost leafless but most of the leaves are sheltered between the stiff interlacing stems as an adaptation to the harsh environment where the plant grows. Leaves are variable, leathery and about 1 cm long.

== Distribution ==
Melicytus alpinus is endemic to New Zealand. There, it can be found in both the North and South Islands in coastal and/or dry alpine areas. It is most common in the South Island high country.

== Habitat ==
Melicytus alpinus is very well adapted to extreme weather conditions such as drought, which is why it can be found in areas such as the heavily modified high country of the South Island.

== Ecology ==
=== Life cycle and phenology ===
In spring and early summer, small white flowers turn into tasty fragrant white, blue-specked fruit. Seeds for the porcupine shrub are dispersed by lizards. The shrub flowers in spring to early summer. The flowers are then insect pollinated and produce small white berries eaten by many native New Zealand lizards, thus starting the cycle again.

=== Diet and foraging ===
The porcupine shrub is very resistant to extreme weather conditions and drought; therefore, it lives in areas of dry, rocky soils with very little water availability. It can also be found in coastal areas with saline, dry soils, with very little structure.

=== Predators, parasites, and diseases ===
Melicytus alpinus is a habitat to many lizard's endemic to New Zealand, this group of lizards include both skinks and geckos. This relationship is mutually beneficial/codependent as the lizards use the porcupine shrub as protection from weather and/or predators and in turn eat and spread the seeds from the shrub's berries.
