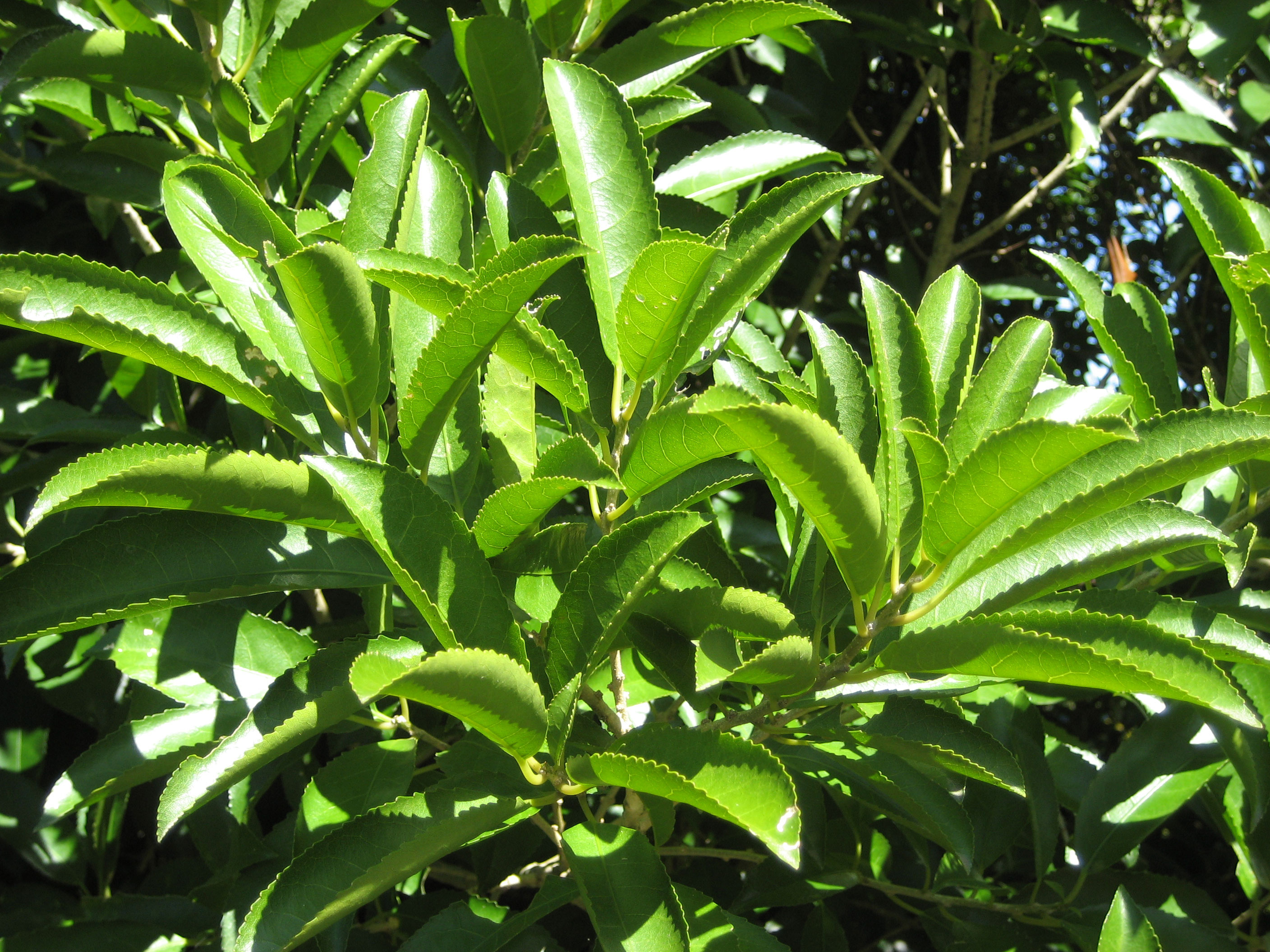
- Melicytus ramiflorus

Scientific classification
- Kingdom: Plantae
- Clade: Embryophytes
- Clade: Tracheophytes
- Clade: Spermatophytes
- Clade: Angiosperms
- Clade: Eudicots
- Clade: Rosids
- Order: Malpighiales
- Family: Violaceae
- Subfamily: Violoideae
- Tribe: Rinoreeae
- Subtribe: Hymenantherinae
- Genus: Melicytus; J.R.Forst. & G.Forst. (1776)

Synonyms
- Hymenanthera R.Br. (1818); Solenantha G.Don (1832); Tachites Sol. ex Gaertn. (1788)

= Melicytus =

Genus of flowering plants

Melicytus is a genus of flowering plants in the family Violaceae. Hymenanthera is a synonym. It includes 19 species native to Australia, New Zealand, and the southwestern Pacific.

== Species ==
19 species are accepted.

- Melicytus alpinus (Kirk) Garn.-Jones – porcupine shrub (New Zealand)
- Melicytus angustifolius (R.Br. ex DC.) Garn.-Jones (New Zealand) [pro. parte synonym of Melicytus dentatus ]
- Melicytus chathamicus (F.Muell.) Garn.-Jones – Chatham Island mahoe (Chatham Islands, New Zealand)
- Melicytus crassifolius (Hook.f.) Garn.-Jones – thick-leaved mahoe (New Zealand)
- Melicytus dentatus (R.Br. ex DC.) Molloy & Mabb. – tree violet (Australia), sometimes present in New Zealand
- Melicytus drucei Molloy & B.D.Clarkson – Druce's mahoe, Mt Egmont shrub mahoe
- Melicytus fasciger Gillespie
- Melicytus flexuosus B.P.J.Molloy & A.P.Druce
- Melicytus improcerus Heenan, Courtney & Molloy
- Melicytus lanceolatus Hook.f. – narrow-leaved mahoe
- Melicytus latifolius (Endl.) P.S.Green
- Melicytus macrophyllus A.Cunn. - large-leaved mahoe
- Melicytus micranthus (Hook.f.) Hook.f. – swamp mahoe
- Melicytus novae-zelandiae (A.Cunn.) P.S.Green – coastal mahoe (New Zealand)
- Melicytus obovatus (Kirk) Garn.-Jones (New Zealand)
- Melicytus orarius Heenan, de Lange, Courtney & Molloy
- Melicytus ramiflorus, J.R. & G. Forster – mahoe or whitey-wood
- Melicytus × ramilanceolatus Allan
- Melicytus samoensis (Christoph.) A.C.Sm.
- Melicytus venosus Courtney, Heenan, Molloy & de Lange
