= Hutt River =

Hutt River may refer to:

- Hutt River (New Zealand)
- Hutt River (South Australia)
- Hutt River (Western Australia)
- Principality of Hutt River, a micronation in Western Australia

== See also ==
- Hutt (disambiguation)
- Eastern Hutt River
- Western Hutt River
