= Water supply in the Wellington Region =

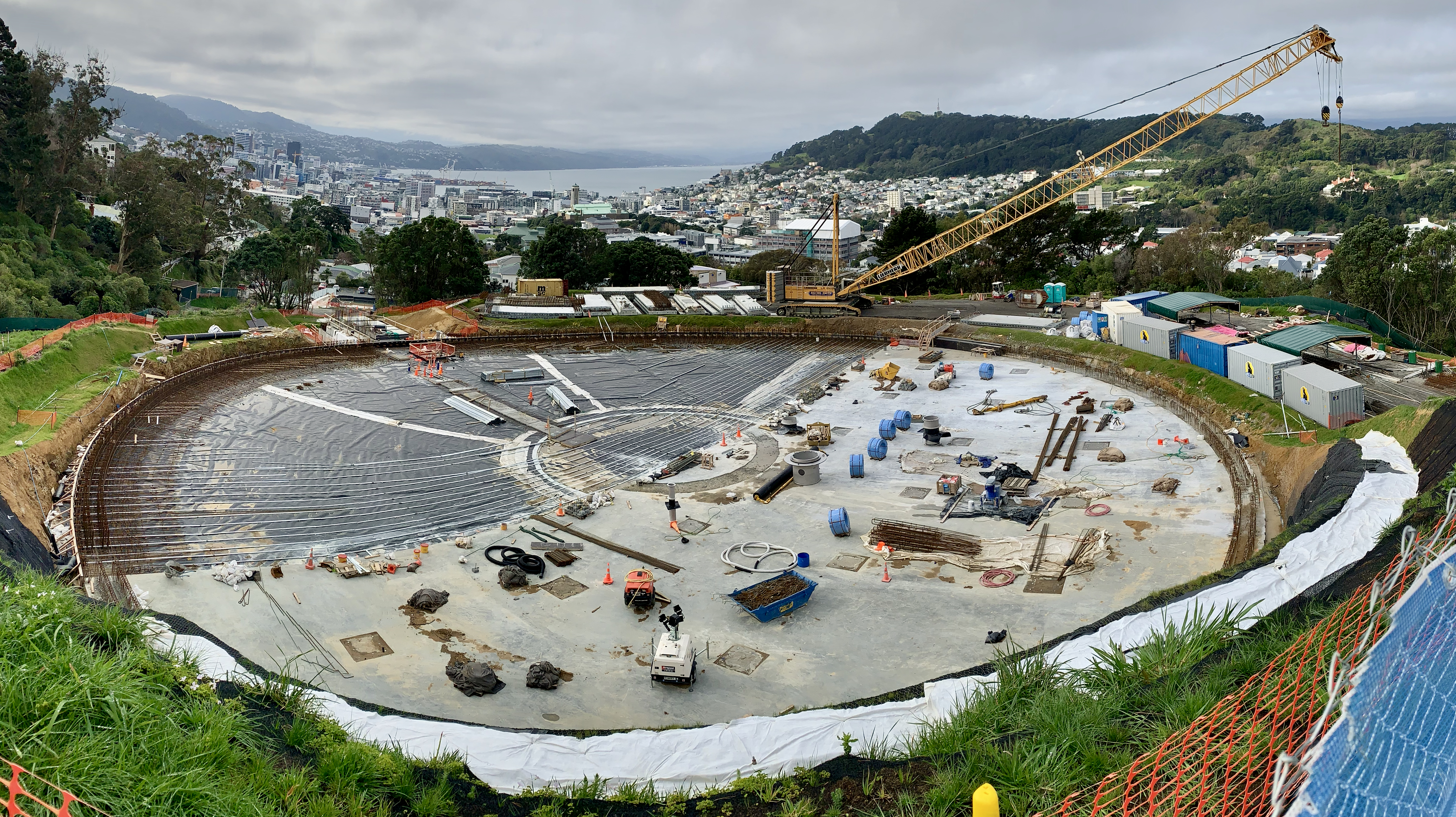
Omāroro Reservoir under construction in the suburb Mount Cook, Wellington

Water supply in the Wellington region involves the provision of drinking water services in the Greater Wellington region of New Zealand.

Water supplies to the Wellington metropolitan area meet the requirements of the Health Act and conform with drinking water standards. However, for some of the towns in the Kāpiti Coast and Wairarapa regions, there have been occasional non-conformances with the required standards for drinking water quality and safety.

The challenges for managing the three waters in the Wellington region include the deteriorated condition of pipelines in the Wellington metropolitan area. The pipelines are in significantly worse condition than those in other large networks nationwide, and there has been a recent history of serious failures. As at 2023, around 44% of the treated water is lost through leaks. The water supply to the region is also at significant risk during a severe earthquake, although some projects are underway to improve resilience.

== Asset ownership and service provision ==
The three waters assets in the Wellington metropolitan area are owned by five councils: Wellington City, Hutt, Upper Hutt and Porirua city councils, and the Greater Wellington Regional Council. However, the water assets of these councils are managed by an infrastructure asset management company, Wellington Water. From 1 October 2019, Wellington Water also became the asset manager of the water assets of the South Wairarapa District Council.

Wellington Water is jointly owned by all six councils.

The assets in the region covered by these six councils includes 6,300 km of pipes, 138 reservoirs, 249 pump stations and four drinking water treatment plants.

Three waters services for the remaining parts of the Greater Wellington region are provided by the Kāpiti Coast District Council, the Carterton District Council and Masterton District Council.

== Asset management and investment planning ==
Benchmarking data published by Water New Zealand as part of their 2018/19 National Performance Review showed that capital expenditure on three waters assets in the Wellington region is well below the average of the expenditure on networks in most other major centres. Approximately 200 kilometres of the city's pipes were laid before the outbreak of World War I, and more than half of all the city's pipes will need replacing in the coming three decades. $578 million is required to fix a backlog of existing issues as at 2020. The forecast costs for new investment just to cope with expected population growth range from $2 billion to $4.5 billion.

Wellington city councillors commented at about the same time that the city was already spending a third of its annual budget on water systems. Councillor Sean Rush said that prioritisation of expenditure had to change from age-based replacement to where the consequences of failure would be the worst.

In May 2021, the Wellington City Council approved a 10 year plan that included expenditure of $2.7 billion on water pipe maintenance and upgrades in Wellington city, and an additional $147 to $208 million for plant upgrades at the Moa Point wastewater treatment plant.

In June 2021, a report released by Wellington Water gave estimates for investments in water infrastructure that could be required to meet forecast population growth to 2050. The report indicated that total new investment for growth could reach $3.6 billion. The estimated cost of upgrade per new dwelling varied widely across the region, from $70,000 to $520,000.

In 2023, a meeting of regional leaders was held to review projected shortfalls in the supply of water. Options under consideration included installation of universal water metering to contain demand, continued emphasis on finding and repairing leaks, and constructing new water storage. It was reported that around 44% of the region's treated water supply is lost through leaks.

== Regional water supply networks ==
The supply of reticulated drinking water is regulated under the Health Act, and suppliers are registered and subject to a testing regime. The registered water suppliers for the Greater Wellington region are listed in annual drinking water quality reports published by the Ministry of Health.

Supplier	Region/ Town	Population
Greater Wellington Water	Wellington metropolitan area – bulk supply	350,000
Hutt City Council	Lower Hutt	95,469
Kāpiti Coast District Council	Ōtaki	5,700
Kāpiti Coast District Council	Paekākāriki	1,665
Kāpiti Coast District Council	Waikanae, Paraparaumu, Raumati	35,800
Porirua City Council	Porirua	46,444
Upper Hutt City Council	Upper Hutt	34,650
Wellington City Council	Wellington City	165,126
Carterton District Council	Carterton	4,200
Masterton District Council	Masterton	19,000
Ōpaki Water Supply Association	Ōpaki	1,500
South Wairarapa District Council	Featherston	2,580
South Wairarapa District Council	Greytown	1,952
South Wairarapa District Council	Martinborough	1,505

This table omits several small supplies serving populations less than 1,000.

== Water sources for Wellington metropolitan area ==
Water supply for the Wellington metropolitan area comes from three sources:

- Hutt River
- Wainuomata and Ōrongorongo rivers
- Waiwhetu aquifer

There are times each year, particularly during summer months, where the total demand is greater than can be supplied from these sources. There are two large storage lakes that can be used to supplement the supply during these periods.

=== Hutt River catchment ===
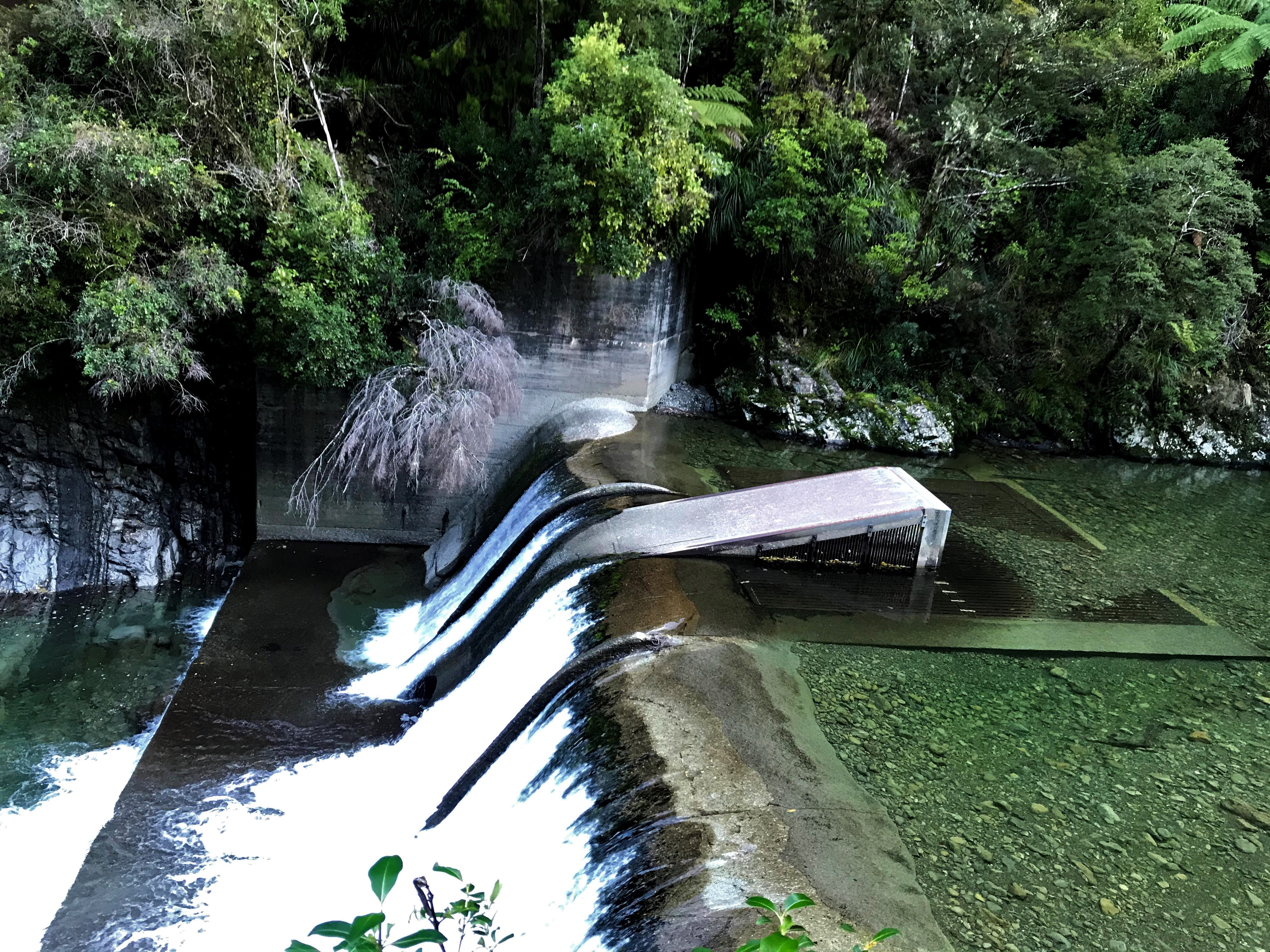
Weir and water supply intake on Hutt River at Kaitoke

The Hutt river water supply catchment covers almost 9,000 hectares of bush-clad mountains and valleys at the southern edge of the Tararua Forest Park and adjoining the Kaitoke Regional Park. Rainwater from tributary streams flows into the Hutt River and is intercepted at a weir at Kaitoke, north of Upper Hutt. The water is then strained to remove sticks, leaves and silt, and piped through tunnels to the Te Mārua Water Treatment Plant. Up to 150 million litres of water per day may be diverted from the Hutt River, provided an adequate flow is maintained downstream of the weir. The Hutt water supply catchment provides about 40 percent of the water used in the Wellington metropolitan area each year.

=== Macaskill storage lakes ===
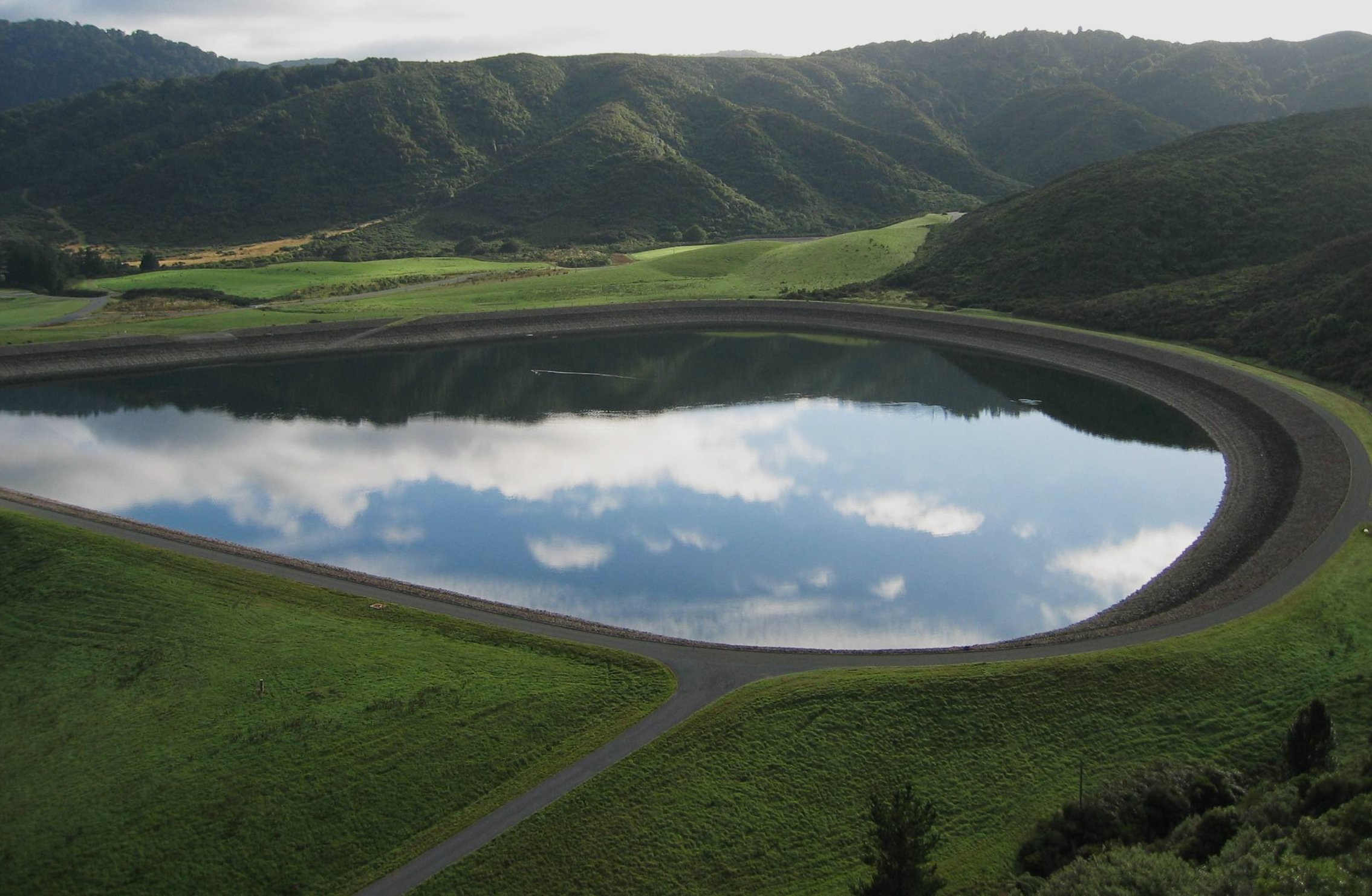
Upper Macaskill lake

There are two large storage lakes at Te Mārua – the Macaskill Lakes. These lakes are filled from the Hutt River intake when the water is clean and there is sufficient flow available. Stored water is pumped from the lakes into the treatment plant when there is not enough water in the river to meet public demand. The storage lakes are also used to meet demand when the river is too dirty – after heavy rainfall – or when it is in flood and the intake is closed to prevent rocks and gravel from entering the intake pipes.

The Macaskill Lakes are 17.3 metres deep and have a combined usable capacity of approximately 3,350 million litres, or enough to meet average water use for around 23 days.

Building the lakes was first proposed in 1975. The construction of the two lakes proved difficult because of weather and on-site conditions, resulting in cost increases and litigation. There were also problems with leaks after completion, leading to further litigation.

=== Wainuomata/Ōrongorongo rivers ===
The Wainuomata/Ōrongorongo water supply catchment area lies within the Remutaka Ranges to the east of Wainuiomata. The collection area covers 7,600 hectares, and includes the Wainuiomata Water Collection Area. Five low dams (weirs) with intake pipes provide water from the rivers to the Wainuiomata Water Treatment Plant. These catchment areas provide approximately 20% of the water used in the Wellington metropolitan area each year. Water from the Wainuiomata treatment plant is piped to the Hutt Valley through the Wainuiomata Tunnel, an abandoned road tunnel that was converted in 1980 to a utilities tunnel.

=== Waiwhetu aquifer ===
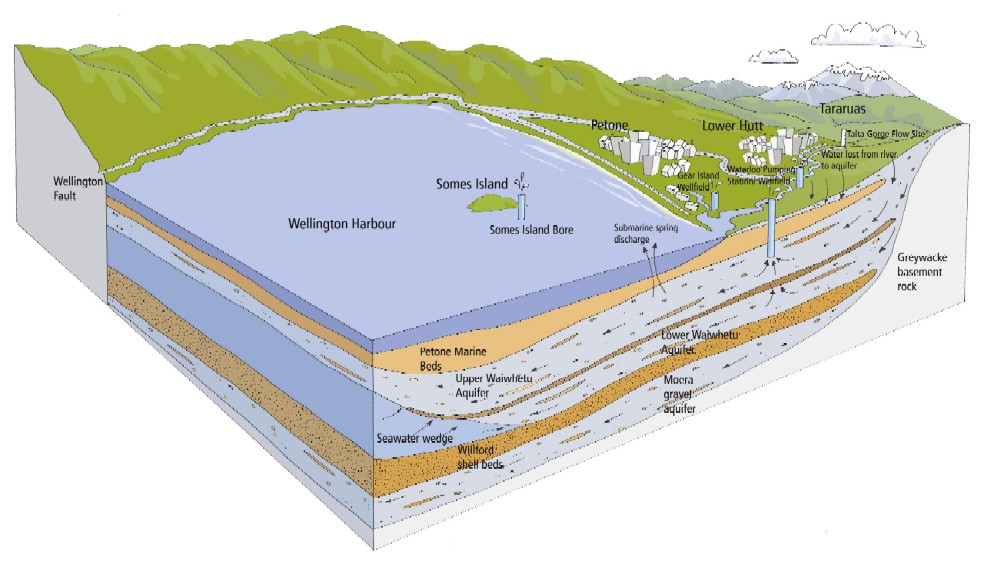
Schematic of Waiwhetu Aquifer

The Waiwhetu artesian aquifer is a zone of water-retaining sand, gravel and boulders beneath the Hutt Valley. Water from the Hutt River starts to flow underground around Taita Gorge. From Melling southwards, the water becomes naturally pressurised beneath a layer of hard clay. This pressurised zone is estimated to be up to 70 metres thick at its western edge against the Wellington Fault, and 20 metres thick at the eastern edge of the harbour. The aquifer extends under Wellington Harbour and supplies several hundred fresh water springs in the harbour floor.

Water takes more than 12 months to pass through the aquifer to wells where it is extracted for distribution via the water network. Extraction is monitored and controlled to minimise the risk of saline intrusion. The Waiwhetu Aquifer provides around 40 percent of the annual water supply.

The Te Puna Wai Ora (Spring of Life) in Buick Street, Petone provides unchlorinated water from the aquifer free to the public. In April 2017 the fountains at Te Puna Wai Ora and the Dowse Art Museum were shut down after returning positive results for coliforms. The fountains were reopened to the public after the installation of filtration and UV treatment.

== Water sources for remaining areas ==
The water sources for the South Wairarapa District Council area are the Waiohine catchment for Featherston, the Kuratawhiti Street bore for Greytown residents, and the Herricks bore field for users in Martinborough.

Water supplies for the Kāpiti Coast region are sourced from combination of bores and surface water from the Waikanae River.

Water supply for the Carterton district comes from the Kaipatangata Stream and two underground bores.

Masterton's drinking water is sourced from the Waingawa River, about 10 km west of Masterton.

== Consumption, losses and metering ==
During a prolonged dry spell in November 2017, Wellington Water reported that weekend consumption in the Wellington metropolitan area reached 171 million litres for the day – around 30 million litres more than a typical day, and the highest November daily consumption in five years. Wellington Water called on consumers to cut back on their water use, and make sure they observe garden watering restrictions.

A National Performance Review published by Water New Zealand for the 2019 financial year showed that daily residential consumption in the Wellington metropolitan region was about 226 litres per person. By way of comparison, daily residential water use in Auckland and Tauranga was significantly lower at about 156 and 189 litres per person respectively. Both Auckland and Tauranga have water metering in place for all residences, but in Wellington only around 1% of residential supplies are currently metered.

The same National Performance Review also compares water losses between supply networks. The 2019 review for Wellington shows that despite having a higher than average system pressure, the water losses (reported as an infrastructure leakage index), were lower than average, and approaching a threshold where action to reduce losses even further could be uneconomic unless there are shortages.

However, in 2023 Wellington Water reported that around 44% of the region's treated water supply is lost through leaks. For Upper Hutt city, Wellington Water reported that 52% of the drinking water supplied was being lost through leaks. An Upper Hutt councillor claimed that the state of the water network in the city was the result of decades of under-investment, and that the city was currently only replacing 1.5 km (0.93 mi) of water mains each year. The Upper Hutt mayor Wayne Guppy disputed the claims and said that he had "no confidence" in Wellington Water and its advice.

In their submission to a Wellington City Council Water Committee, Wellington Water warned that "current water consumption and a growing population will lead to water shortages by 2040".

=== Water meters ===
In March 2020, it was reported that Wellington City Council was considering installing water meters for all domestic consumers. At the time of that report, only 1,200 residential properties in Wellington were using water meters.

In December 2017, the Kāpiti Coast District Council reported that there had been a drop in consumption of more than 26% since water meters were installed in July 2014.

== Water treatment ==
=== Wellington metropolitan area ===
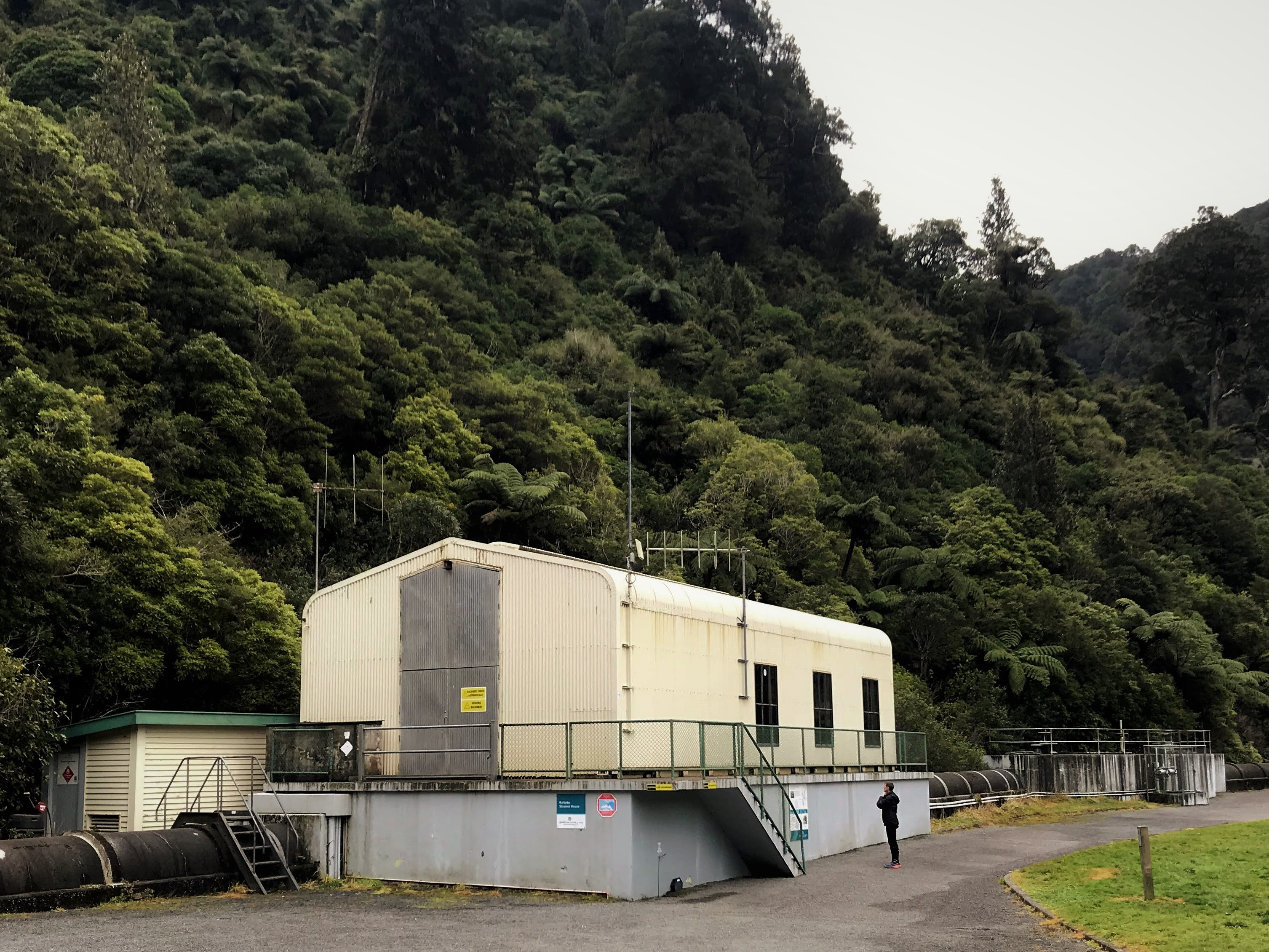
Sand trap and strainer house for water supply intake at Kaitoke

The reticulated water supply to the Wellington metropolitan area is all chlorinated. Drinking water in Lower Hutt, Porirua, Upper Hutt and Wellington city is also fluoridated. The only exceptions are Petone and Korokoro. These suburbs historically had an unfluoridated water supply and this has continued following a public survey in 2000.

There are four water treatment plants located in the Hutt Valley (Te Mārua, Waterloo, Gear Island and Wainuiomata). These plants supply water for use in Upper Hutt, Lower Hutt, Porirua and Wellington cities. The treatment processes at the four treatment plants differ based on the characteristics of the incoming water.

At the Te Mārua water treatment plant, the main treatment processes are:

- Straining
- Coagulation and flocculation
- Sedimentation
- Filtration
- Chlorination
- pH adjustment
- Fluoridation

The Gear Island and Waterloo plants both treat water that is drawn from the Waiwhetu aquifer.

=== Fluoridation failure 2021-22 ===
In March 2022, Wellington Water revealed that there had been a prolonged failure of fluoridation equipment at water treatment plants owned by Greater Wellington Regional Council at Te Marua and Gear Island. It initially stated that there had been no fluoridation of water for a month, but later admitted that there had been no fluoride in the water from one of the region’s water treatment plants since May 2021 and from another plant since November 2021. There was widespread criticism, and Wellington Water announced it would be holding an independent inquiry into the cause of the failures and why it had provided misleading information.

== Water supply pipeline age and condition ==
The 2018/19 National Performance Review published by Water New Zealand compares the average pipeline age and condition across water supply networks. The data for the Wellington water supply network shows that 20% of the pipelines are in poor or very poor condition. The Wellington network ranks the worst on this measure out of the six large supply networks nationwide. The review also includes average pipeline age. The Wellington network has an average age of 43 years, and ranks as the second oldest of the six large supply networks.

== Quality and safety ==
Drinking water is subject to a regime of testing under the Health Act to verify that the water meets standards.

The summary results of compliance testing for the 2019/20 year were:

Supplier	Region/ Town	Health Act	Standards
Greater Wellington Water	Wellington metropolitan area – bulk supply	Complied	Met
Hutt City Council	Lower Hutt	Complied	Met
Kāpiti Coast District Council	Hautere	Complied	Met
Kāpiti Coast District Council	Ōtaki	Complied	Failed
Kāpiti Coast District Council	Paekākāriki	Complied	Met
Kāpiti Coast District Council	Waikanae, Paraparaumu, Raumati	Complied	Met
Porirua City Council	Judgeford	Complied	Met
Porirua City Council	Porirua	Complied	Met
Upper Hutt City Council	Upper Hutt	Complied	Met
Wellington City Council	Wellington City	Complied	Met
Carterton District Council	Carterton	Failed	Failed
Fernridge Water Supply Association	Fernridge	Failed	Failed
Masterton District Council	Masterton	Complied	Met
Masterton District Council	Tinui	Complied	Met
Ōpaki Water Supply Association	Ōpaki	Complied	Failed
South Wairarapa District Council	Featherston	Complied	Failed
South Wairarapa District Council	Greytown	Complied	Failed
South Wairarapa District Council	Martinborough	Complied	Failed

=== Waiwhetu aquifer ===
Up until late 2016, bores in the Waterloo well field were considered to be secure. However, a rising trend in bacterial count and E.coli detections triggered a review. At that stage, about half the customers supplied from the Waterloo treatment station received unchlorinated water.

During 2016 and 2017, water supply businesses throughout New Zealand became aware of the severe public health consequences of the Havelock North drinking water contamination incident and the subsequent Government inquiry that recommended all drinking water supplies should be chlorinated.

In 2017, a decision was made by Greater Wellington Regional Council to chlorinate all the water drawn from the Waiwhetu aquifer.

=== Martinborough ===
There were two periods during early 2019 when a "boil water" notice was issued to the residents of Martinborough.

An independent report into the first incident found significant shortcomings in the design, operation and management of the Martinborough water supply system. The report revealed that a UV disinfection system failed after a power cut, and untreated water was pumped into the supply pipelines until the following day. A comment was made that it was only a matter of luck that the incident did not lead to a repeat of the widespread illness and deaths that occurred in the Havelock North water contamination in August 2016. Following the contamination incidents, the town water supply was chlorinated, but this introduced a problem with discolouration because the water from some of the water supply bores is naturally high in manganese. In November 2019, Wellington Water said that Martinborough residents needed to reduce demand to avoid restrictions, and also to prevent the water from becoming discoloured if it became necessary to draw water from bores that have a higher naturally occurring manganese content.

In March 2021, the South Wairarapa District Council and Wellington Water officially opened a new manganese reduction plant that will boost supply by allowing water to be drawn from all the available bores, and chlorinated, without leading to discolouration of the water.

=== Carterton ===
During March and April 2021, the Carterton District Council issued three separate "boil-water" notices, following the discovery of low levels of E.coli in the town's drinking water.

== Resilience ==
=== Wellington metropolitan area ===
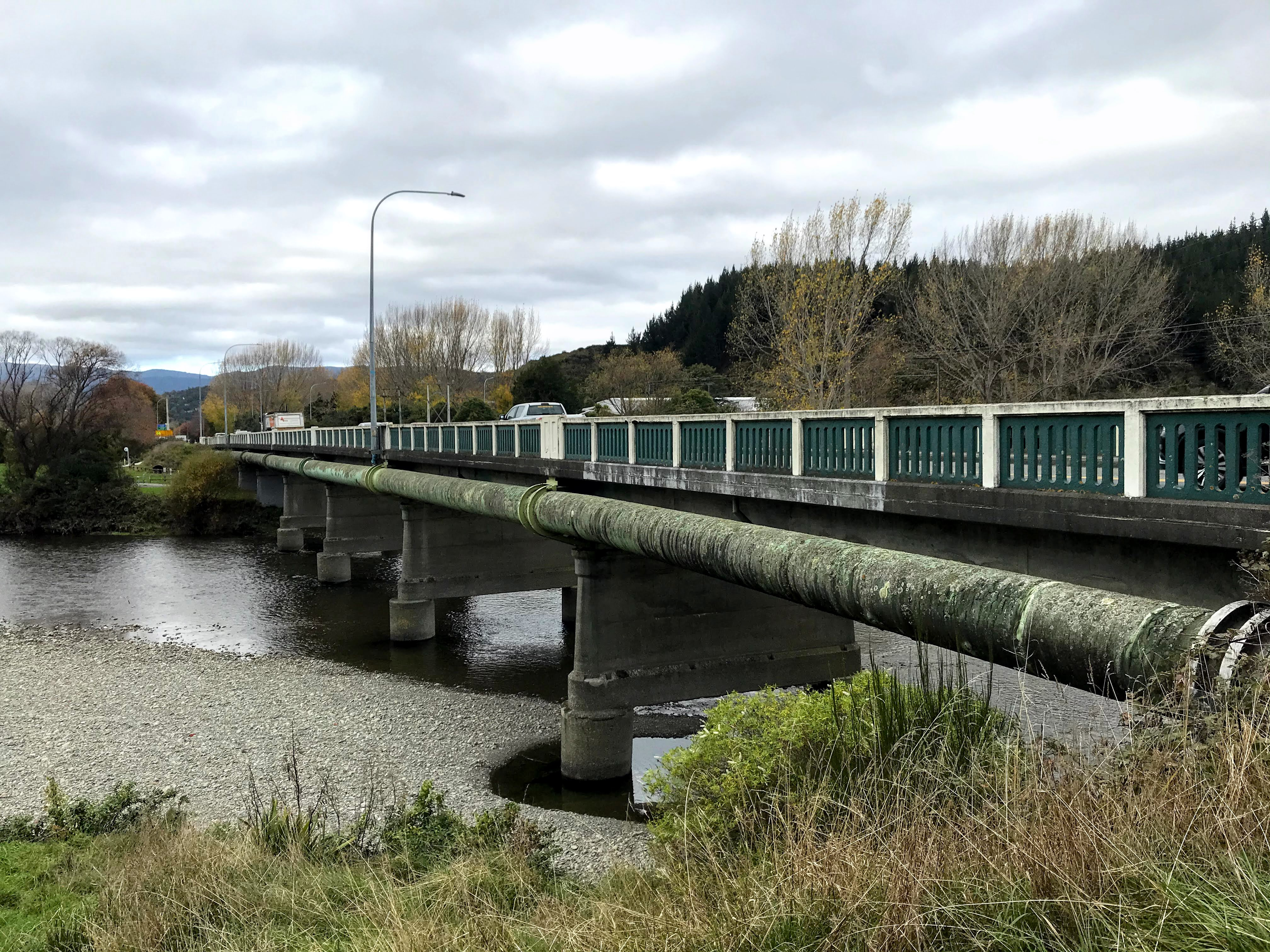
Bulk water supply pipeline across Hutt River at Silverstream Bridge

The supply of water to the Wellington region is potentially vulnerable to significant disruption in the event of failures caused by a major earthquake.

An application in 2017 by Wellington Water for an easement for a storage reservoir referenced a 2009 study conducted by GNS Science of possible earthquake damage to the water network. This study estimated that for a magnitude 7.5 Richter scale earthquake, there would be about 30 breaks on the main trunk pipelines and 60 breaks on the smaller branch lines. There could be as many as 8,000 breaks in the Wellington City local supply network. Bulk water supply and treatment facilities are also expected to suffer damage requiring repair. Wellington Water and Greater Wellington Regional Council estimated that it would take around 60‐70 days to restore bulk water supply to parts of the Wellington metropolitan area. It could take several years to fully repair damage to the local water distribution network resulting from a severe earthquake, as much of the network may have to be rebuilt.

In 2013, GNS Science published a study examining a wide range of issues about the impacts of a large earthquake on Wellington's water supply. Some of the key findings and implications for Civil Defence and Emergency Management from this report include:

- The amount of water people have stored in their homes
- The importance of reservoirs in the provision of water post-earthquake
- People's willingness to collect and carry water from reservoirs to their homes
- The importance of developing alternative sources of water to cater for post-earthquake demand
- The prioritization of water supplies

In 2016, the Wellington Lifelines Group began work on a Regional Resilience Project, with the aim of ensuring that core infrastructure is as resilient as possible and can enable rapid economic recovery following a major earthquake.

In October 2019, the Wellington Lifelines Group published their report "Protecting Wellington's Economy Through Accelerated Infrastructure Investment Programme Business Case".

The appendices to this report include studies of possible impacts of a major earthquake. The base case studies show that in a major earthquake, the Wellington region would be likely to lose its water supplies for a period of between 3 and 6 months, with treated water potentially not available for up to 12 months. A wide range of risk mitigation projects were identified and included in modelling to show the potential improvements in resilience. The risk mitigation projects included works to reduce the risk posed to the bulk water supply that runs parallel to the line of the main Wellington fault. The modelling of outages indicates that the outage time would reduce to between one and three months, if all the identified risk mitigations were implemented.

The report called on its 16 member organisations to help deliver 25 key infrastructure projects across the region over the next two decades, at a cost of $5.3b. It was forecast that implementing these projects would save the country more than $6.1b in lost economic activity in the five years following a major earthquake. The list of 25 proposed projects covers a range of lifeline utilities. The proposed water supply resilience projects are shown below.

Project	Proposed works	Est. cost	Timeframe
Cross-harbour pipeline	Build 12.7 km underwater pipeline from Seaview to Evans Bay, with connection to Carmichael Reservoir	$139m	2020–2023
Prince of Wales and Bell Rd reservoir upgrade	Build 35 megalitre reservoir at Prince of Wales Park and 10 megalitre reservoir at Bell Rd	$78m	2019–2025
Silverstream Bridge pipeline replacement	Replace Te Mārua-to-Ngauranga pipeline where it crosses Silverstream Bridge and Wellington Fault	$23m	2019–2021
General toughening of pipes	Upgrade 152 km network of critical ductile pipes	$654m	2019–2025
Carmichael to Johnsonville and Karori pipeline	New water main between Carmichael Reservoir and pump station near Omāroro Reservoir; pump station between cross-harbour pipeline and Johnsonville; water main between Omāroro Reservoir and Churchill Drive; upgrade to batter slopes along Grant Rd, Lennel Rd, and Wadestown Rd	$247m	2026–2031
Porirua low-level zone reservoirs	Build additional nine-megalitre reservoir, and three-megalitre storage area at Takapuwahia	$25m	2026–2028
Waterloo Water Treatment Plant upgrade	Reduce liquefaction risk and improve ground at southern end, or provide extra structural support	$2m	2029–2032
General toughening of pipes	As above	n/a	2026–2032

==== Omāroro/Prince of Wales reservoir ====
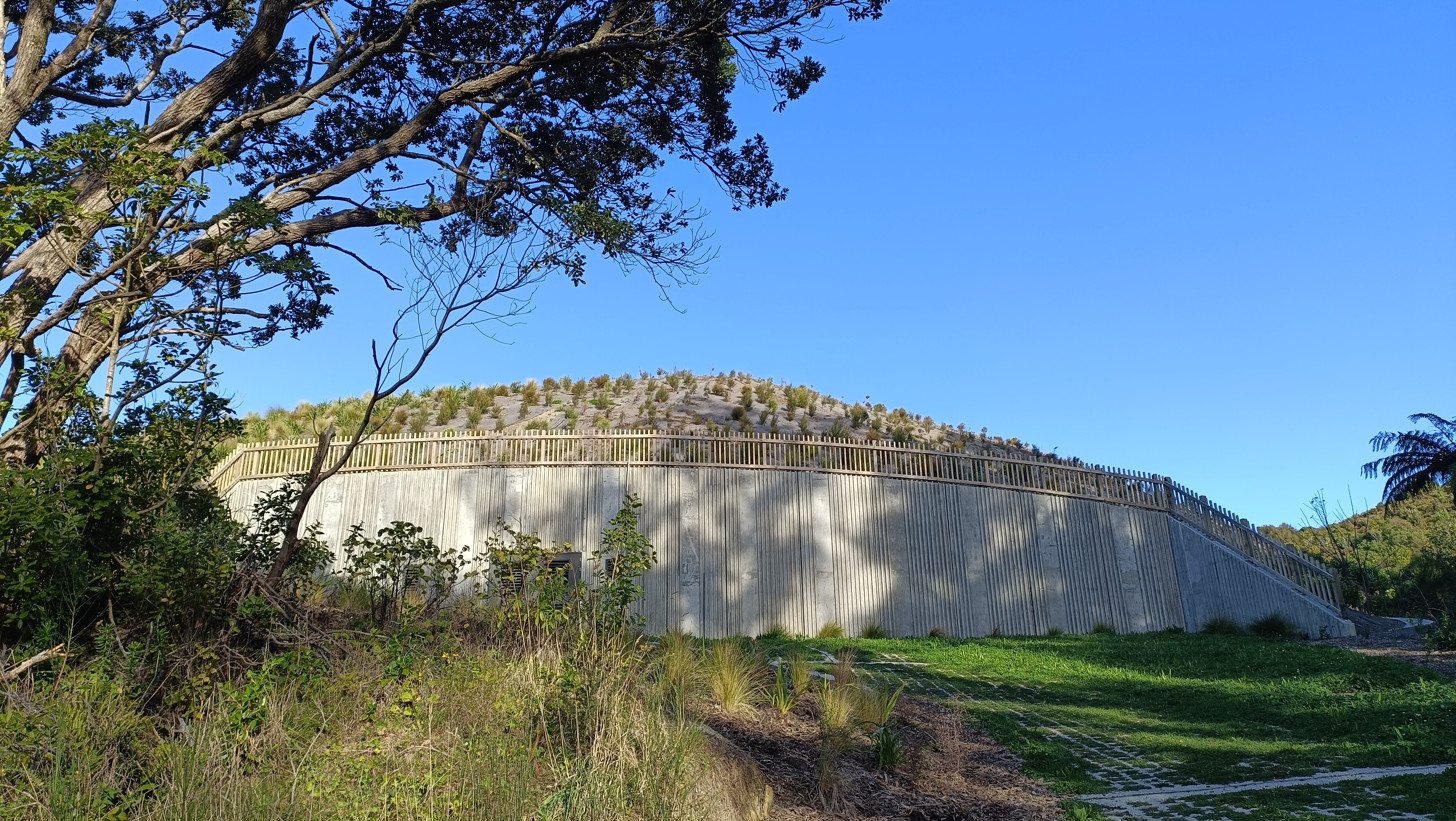
Omāroro Reservoir

In 2017, Wellington Water applied for the designation of an easement required for the construction of a 35 million litre reservoir on land within the Wellington Town Belt, at Prince of Wales Park in the Wellington suburb of Mt Cook. The reservoir provides a significant increase in water storage for the city, and forms part of the city's resilience strategy to help ensure that fresh water is available to residents after a natural disaster or major network failure. In May 2018, an independent panel recommended that Wellington City Council confirm the designation of the easement for the reservoir. Preparatory earthworks for the project commenced in February 2019, and a ceremony to mark the completion of the project was held on 12 February 2024. The cost of the project was forecast in 2020 as $68.1 million.

== See also ==
- Tiaki Wai
- Water supply and sanitation in New Zealand
- Water in New Zealand
- Wainuiomata River
- Birchville Dam
- Zealandia - former water catchment and reservoirs
