= Hutt =

Hutt can refer to:

== Places ==
=== New Zealand ===
- Hutt River (New Zealand), name after William Hutt (politician).
  - Hutt Valley, an area inland from Wellington
  - Hutt County, a former county in the Hutt Valley
  - Lower Hutt ('Hutt City'), a territorial authority (formerly part of Hutt County)
  - Upper Hutt ('Upper Hutt City'), a territorial authority (formerly part of Hutt County)
  - Hutt (New Zealand electorate), a former electorate, 1983-1956
- Mount Hutt, a mountain and ski field in the Southern Aps

=== Australia ===
- Hutt River (South Australia)
- Hutt River (Western Australia)
- Hutt Lagoon, Western Australia
- Hutt Street, Adelaide, South Australia

=== Antarctica ===
- Hutt Peak, Marie Byrd Land

== Other uses ==
- Hutt (surname)
- Hutt (Star Wars), a fictional alien species
- Hutt International Boys' School, a state integrated boys' secondary school in Upper Hutt, New Zealand
- Hutt Intermediate School, Lower Hutt, New Zealand
- Hutt Recreation Ground, a football, cricket and rugby union ground in Lower Hutt, New Zealand

== See also ==
- Principality of Hutt River, a self-proclaimed independent state within the borders of Western Australia
