= Waione Street Bridge =

Bridge over the Hutt River in New Zealand

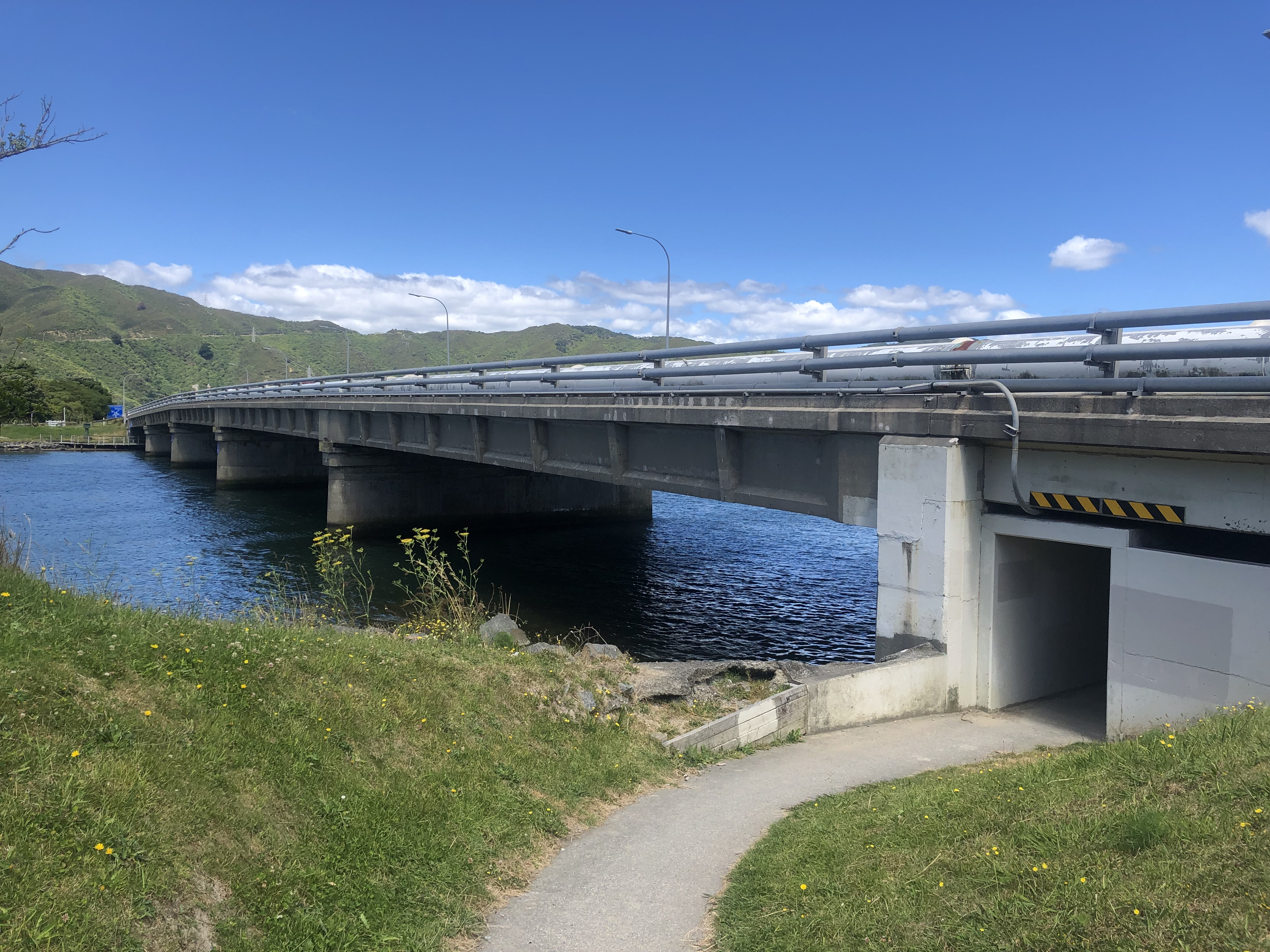
- Waione Street Bridge viewed from the Petone side
- Coordinates: 41°13′59″S 174°54′00″E
- Carries: Waione Street
- Crosses: Te Awa Kairangi / Hutt River
- Other name: Hutt Estuary Bridge

Characteristics
- Design: Simply-supported prestressed concrete spans
- Width: 16.383 m (53.75 ft)
- Longest span: 32 m (105 ft)
- No. of spans: 5

History
- Constructed by: Wilkins & Davies Construction Company
- Opened: September 1954

Location
- Interactive map of Waione Street Bridge

The Waione Street Bridge (also known as the Hutt Estuary Bridge) is a bridge across the Hutt River in Lower Hutt, New Zealand that was completed in 1954. The bridge is notable because it was the first substantial bridge in New Zealand to be constructed using prestressed concrete beams. The bridge connects Petone with Seaview, and carries Waione Street with one lane in each direction. It also carries major water pipes across the Hutt River. There is a pedestrian walkway on the south side. The bridge has 5 main spans, each of 32 m (105 ft) length, supported with four piers installed into the bed of the river.

The foundations of the bridge are unusual, because the piers are bedded on a layer of marine clay that overlies the Waiwhetu artesian aquifer.

== History ==
=== Former Hutt pipe bridge ===
An earlier combined pipe and road bridge was constructed across the Hutt River near the estuary between 1909 and 1910, although lengthy delays occurred in constructing the approaches. The bridge was jointly funded by Wellington City, Hutt County, Lower Hutt Borough, Petone Borough, with a State contribution. By 1931, there were serious concerns about the ability of the pipe bridge to withstand the increasingly heavy loads that it was required to carry that were well beyond original design intentions. A speed limit for motor vehicles was imposed. Heavy vehicle traffic during World War II added to the loads on the bridge. In October 1943, in addition to managing military traffic, US Marines were controlling civilian traffic across the bridge to help manage risk. A five-year plan adopted in December 1946 included provision for replacing the pipe bridge. Various proposals for strengthening the existing bridge were considered until a decision was made in 1951 to construct a new bridge.

=== The new concrete bridge ===
The replacement bridge was jointly funded by Petone and Eastbourne Borough Councils, Lower Hutt and Wellington City Corporations, and Hutt County Council, with central Government also making a contribution. The engineer W.G. Morrison successfully persuaded the councils that a design using prestressed concrete would provide an economical solution and could be built quickly. It was the first large prestressed concrete bridge to be built in New Zealand.

The piers for the bridge presented unusual challenges because of the existence of Waiwhetu artesian aquifer beneath a layer of marine clay under the bed of the estuary. The aquifer is a vitally important source of water supply for the region. Bridge foundations that penetrated the clay layer could cause significant risk to the aquifer, and the bridge piers were therefore designed to have their foundations above the layer of clay. Eighty prestressed concrete beams were required for the superstructure, and each of these weigh around 40 tonnes.

The contractor for the new concrete bridge was the Wellington-based construction company Wilkins and Davies. Many of their workers lived in a temporary camp built close to the construction site. They were accommodated in spartan conditions, in sheds constructed using the packing crates of kitset automobiles that were shipped to New Zealand for assembly at that time.

In 1990, the bridge was recognised by the Institution of Professional Engineers (now Engineering New Zealand) as an important part of New Zealand’s engineering heritage.

Work to protect the piers of the bridge from scouring was undertaken in 1999 using an excavator mounted on a barge. Funding for seismic strengthening was also approved in the same year.

== Recreational uses ==
The walkway on the bridge is a popular location for fishing. It is also used by cyclists, and forms part of the Remutaka Cycle Trail. However, the walkway is not sufficiently wide to safely accommodate people fishing, walking and cycling.
