= Hutt (surname) =

Hutt is a surname. Notable people with it include:

- Herman Hutt (1872–1952), American politician
- John Hutt (1795–1880), Governor of Western Australia from 1839 to 1846
- Joan Hutt (1913–1985), English painter
- Mark Hutt, known for the murder of Donna Jones
- Michael Hutt (disambiguation), multiple people
- William Hutt (disambiguation), multiple people
