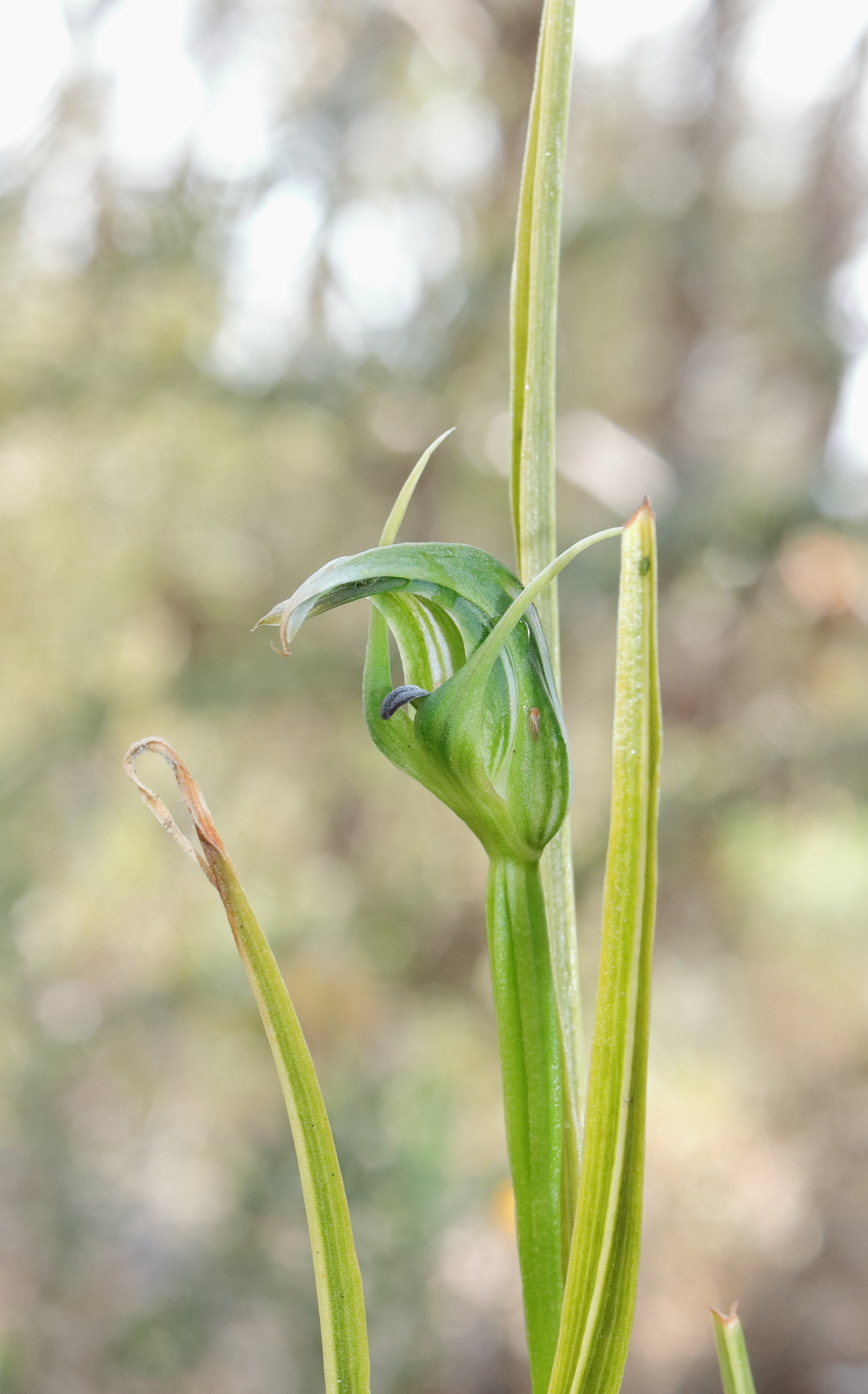
- Near Kaitoke

Scientific classification
- Kingdom: Plantae
- Clade: Tracheophytes
- Clade: Angiosperms
- Clade: Monocots
- Order: Asparagales
- Family: Orchidaceae
- Subfamily: Orchidoideae
- Tribe: Cranichideae
- Genus: Pterostylis
- Species: P. graminea

Binomial name
- Pterostylis graminea Hook.f.

= Pterostylis graminea =

Grass-leaved greenhood

Species of orchid

Pterostylis graminea, commonly known as the grass-leaved greenhood, is a species of orchid endemic to New Zealand. It has erect, grass-like leaves with the upper ones higher than the yellowish-green and transparent white flower.

== Description ==
Pterostylis graminea is a terrestrial, perennial, deciduous, herb with an underground tuber. It has between four and six erect, linear to lance-shaped, grass-like leaves which are V-shaped in cross-section, 80–150 mm (3–6 in) long and 5–10 mm (0.2–0.4 in) wide. The top-most leaves are the longest and are higher than the flower. There is a single yellowish green flower with transparent white stripes borne on a flowering stem up to 330 mm (10 in) high. The dorsal sepal and petals are fused, forming a hood or "galea" over the column. The dorsal sepal is more or less erect near its base then suddenly curves forward then below horizontal. The petals are slightly flared and slightly shorter than the dorsal sepal. There is a wide gap between the lateral sepals and the galea and the lateral sepals have thread-like tips which are erect, spread slightly apart from each other and are higher than the galea. The labellum is greenish-brown, darker near the tip, curved and protrudes above the sinus. Flowering occurs between September and January.

== Taxonomy and naming ==
Pterostylis graminea was first formally described in 1853 by Joseph Dalton Hooker and the description was published in The Botany of the Antarctic Voyage of H.M. Discovery Ships Erebus and Terror in the years 1839–1843, under the Command of Captain Sir James Clark Ross. The specific epithet (graminea) is a Latin word meaning 'of grass' or 'grassy'.

== Distribution and habitat ==
The grass-leaved greenhood grows in forest and scrub, sometimes in the margins of wetlands and occurs on both the North and South Islands and on Stewart Island at altitudes of up to 1,000 m (3,300 ft).
