= Kaitoke Regional Park =

Regional park in the Wellington Region

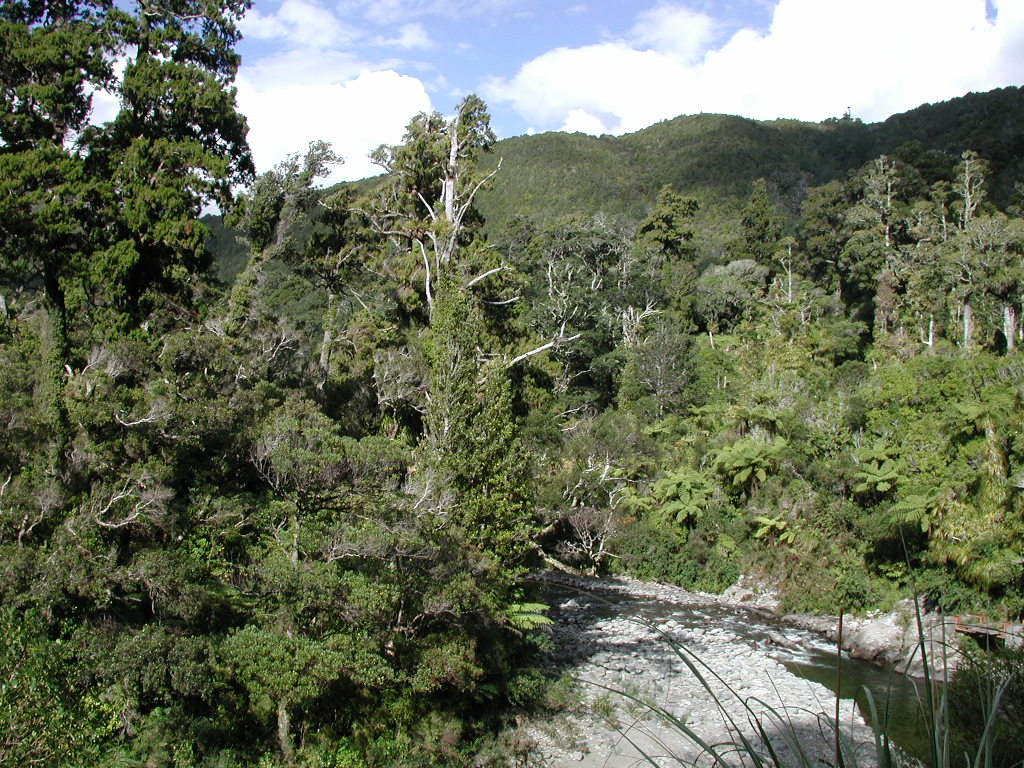
- Hutt River in Kaitoke Regional Park
- Interactive map of Kaitoke Regional Park
- Type: Wellington Regional park
- Location: Kaitoke, New Zealand
- Coordinates: 41.069027°S 175.198658°E
- Area: 2,860 ha (7,100 acres)
- Created: 1983
- Operator: Wellington Regional Council
- Open: 6am-6pm (April–September); 6am-9pm (October–March)
- Status: Open

Kaitoke Regional Park is regional park located at Kaitoke, northeast of Upper Hutt, in the Wellington Region of New Zealand's southern North Island. It is administered by Wellington Regional Council, alongside the adjacent Hutt Water Collection Area.

== Geography ==
The park covers 2,860 ha (7,100 acres) in the Tararua Ranges foothills. The steep hills and Hutt River gorge are covered in native trees.

The conifer-broadleaf rainforest at the fork of Pākuratahi River and Te Awa Kairangi / Hutt River typifies the original vegetation of the area. There is centuries-old rātā, rimu, hinau and kāmahi on the upper slopes, red beech on the lower slopes, and black beech on higher spurs and ridge tops with poorer soils.

The forests form an ecological corridor between the Remutaka Ranges and Tararua Ranges, and Pakuratahi and Hutt River catchments. The connected bush provides a habitat for a range of birds and native fish, including tūī, kererū, pīwakawaka (fantails), korimako (bellbirds) or miromiro (tomtits).

== History ==
=== Pre-establishment ===
Before European settlement, local Māori had established several routes between Wairarapa and Wellington through the Kaitoke area. Whakataka Pā is believed to have established at Te Mārua before 1820. A European road was opened in 1856.

Many of the forests were cleared by early European settlers to provide timber, farm supplies, water and transport routes. Some areas of untouched forest were purchased by local authorities in 1939 for water supplies. Further adjacent land was purchased after World War II, on 20 November 1951, to form Hutt Water Collection Area.

Following the war, the area became a site for picnicking and swimming. In 1976 the Wellington Regional Planning Authority identified the area as a potential regional park because of its native forests and recreational options.

=== Post-establishment ===
The park officially opened in 1983. The Wellington Botanical Society and local Upper Hutt branch of Forest and Bird have been involved in protecting and restoring the park.

The park was the filming location for exterior shots of Rivendell for the 2001 movie The Lord of the Rings: The Fellowship of the Ring.

Two people were injured in a plane crash in the regional park in 2016, and one person died in another plane crash in 2020. Toxic algae has remained an ongoing issue in the regional park, with outbreaks in November 2017 and February 2019.

In August 2021, a wheelchair-accessible suspension bridge was opened across Te Awa Kairangi / Hutt River. During the same month, major restoration work began to make the park a carbon sink for the Wellington Region.

== Recreation ==
The park consists mostly native bush, but there are also walking tracks and swimming holes. The most popular loop walk in the park leads through the valley of the upper Te Awa Kairangi / Hutt River. The suspension bridge and some forest tracks are wheelchair accessible.

There are several sites for camping, with drinking water, toilet, power outlet and electric barbecue facilities. Campfires are permitted, but not near riverbeds or tent sites.

As a filming location for The Lord of the Rings: The Fellowship of the Ring, the park also has sightseeing spots and guided tours for Tolkien tourists.

The park opened from 6am to 6pm between April and September, and from 6am to 9pm between October and March. Dogs are permitted, but fireworks are not.

== Climate ==
Climate data for Kaitoke (1991–2020)
| Month | Jan | Feb | Mar | Apr | May | Jun | Jul | Aug | Sep | Oct | Nov | Dec | Year |
|---|---|---|---|---|---|---|---|---|---|---|---|---|---|
| Mean daily maximum °C (°F) | 20.6 (69.1) | 21.3 (70.3) | 19.4 (66.9) | 17.0 (62.6) | 14.6 (58.3) | 11.8 (53.2) | 11.6 (52.9) | 12.1 (53.8) | 13.6 (56.5) | 15.2 (59.4) | 16.8 (62.2) | 19.1 (66.4) | 16.1 (61.0) |
| Daily mean °C (°F) | 15.9 (60.6) | 16.2 (61.2) | 14.4 (57.9) | 11.9 (53.4) | 10.1 (50.2) | 7.9 (46.2) | 7.4 (45.3) | 7.6 (45.7) | 9.4 (48.9) | 10.6 (51.1) | 11.9 (53.4) | 14.5 (58.1) | 11.5 (52.7) |
| Mean daily minimum °C (°F) | 11.2 (52.2) | 11.0 (51.8) | 9.3 (48.7) | 6.8 (44.2) | 5.5 (41.9) | 3.9 (39.0) | 3.2 (37.8) | 3.1 (37.6) | 5.1 (41.2) | 5.9 (42.6) | 7.0 (44.6) | 9.8 (49.6) | 6.8 (44.3) |
| Average rainfall mm (inches) | 116.8 (4.60) | 133.9 (5.27) | 131.7 (5.19) | 178.9 (7.04) | 120.8 (4.76) | 210.3 (8.28) | 237.5 (9.35) | 210.8 (8.30) | 202.6 (7.98) | 300.6 (11.83) | 235.7 (9.28) | 148.1 (5.83) | 2,227.7 (87.71) |
| Mean monthly sunshine hours | 223.4 | 184.5 | 159.7 | 140.4 | 100.0 | 62.0 | 84.3 | 102.2 | 119.1 | 157.8 | 150.7 | 177.4 | 1,661.5 |
Source: NIWA (sun 1981–2010)
