= Hutt Water Collection Area =

Reserve in Upper Hutt, New Zealand

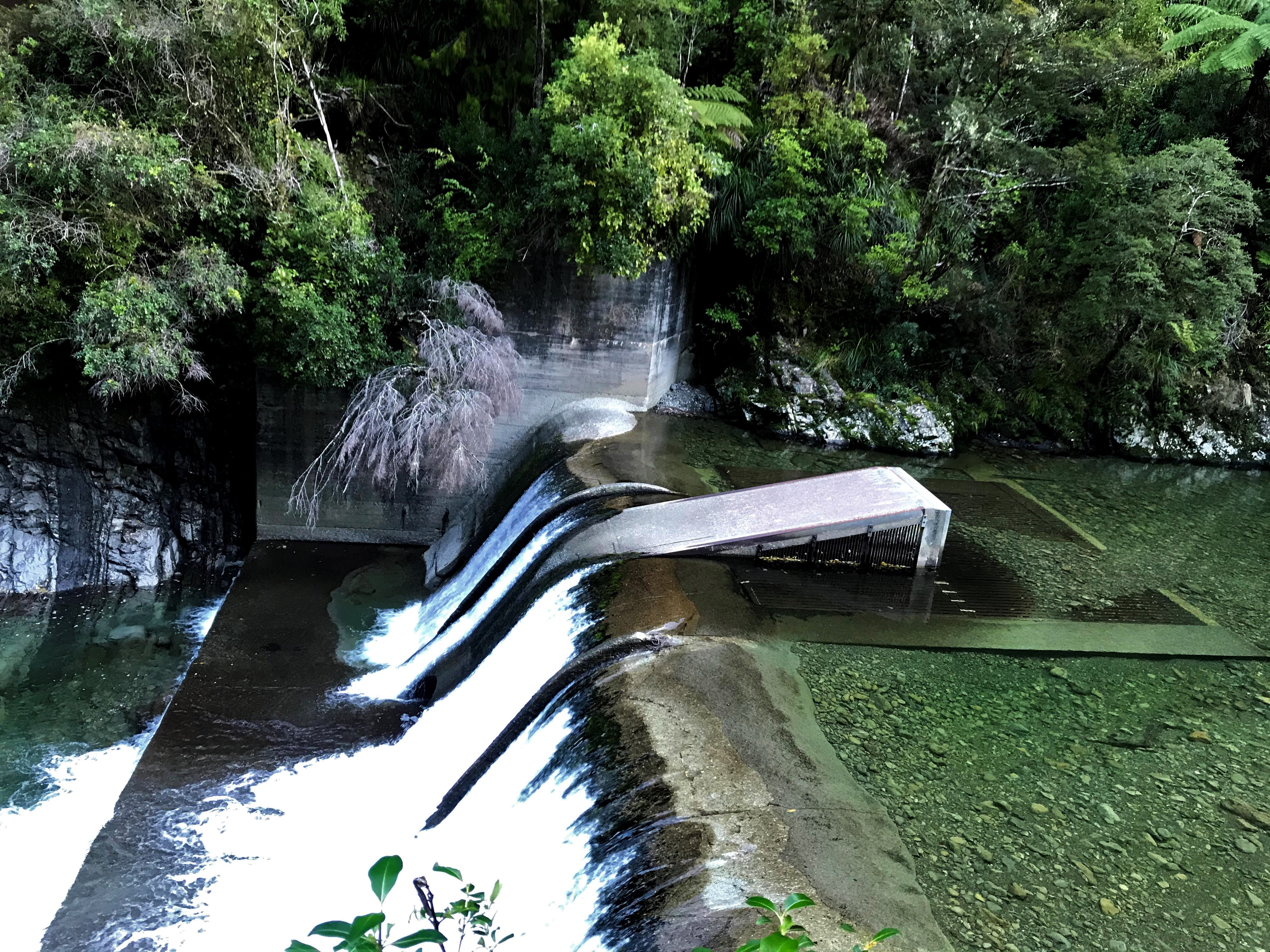
- Kaitoke weir
- Interactive map of Hutt Water Collection Area
- Type: Reserve
- Location: Upper Hutt, Wellington Region, New Zealand
- Coordinates: 41°00′36″S 175°09′18″E
- Area: 8,900 hectares (22,000 acres)
- Created: 1951
- Operator: Wellington Regional Council
- Open: 6am-dusk
- Status: Open

Hutt Water Collection Area is a reserve located in Upper Hutt in the Wellington Region at the southern end of New Zealand's North Island. It is administered by Wellington Regional Council and is located alongside the larger Kaitoke Regional Park.

The park covers 8,900 hectares (22,000 acres) in the headwaters of Te Awa Kairangi / Hutt River at the southern end of the Tararua Range. The Kaitohe weir is the largest of Wellington Water's three water supply sources, providing between 40 and 50% of the water supply for the Wellington urban area.

== Geography ==
The landscape is rugged and mountainous, with streams and narrow, steep-sided ridges. Hilltops are extremely exposed to the north-west and the south, with high winds and fog. There can be sudden weather changes, and rivers and streams can rise very rapidly in heavy rain.

The park has extensive silver beech and red beech. The valley floor includes podocarpaceae, alpine tussock and sub-alpine sphagnum bog. It includes some of the Wellington Region's southern rātā, and native forest birds like kākā, kākāriki and kārearea.

== History ==
There is very little evidence of Māori or European use of the land during the 19th century. It was not sold off by the New Zealand Company in 1840, but part of it may have been sold to private interests during Kāpiti Coast land sales before 1860.

Private landowners began selling the land to local authorities for water supplies when the Wellington City and Suburban Water Supply Board was established in 1927. A sale was proposed again in 1936, but a sale didn't take place until 20 November 1951 following a change of ownership.

An aerial 1080 pest control programme took place in the area in 2019. A further aerial drop was due to take place during winter 2022.

== Recreation ==
The park is open from 6am until dusk. Dogs and fireworks are not permitted at any time.

There are tracks for walking, running and tramping in the park:

- Kaitoke to Hutt Forks (2 hours), a formed track over the ridge into the catchment.
- Hutt Forks - Alpha via Eastern Hutt (5 hours), a marked route from the right bank of the Eastern Hutt River, that later becomes unmarked.
- Hutt Forks - Alpha via Quoin Ridge (6 hours), a track from Forks Head north up Quoin Ridge, which requires a map and compass.
- Hutt Forks - Renata Hutt via Western Hutt (7 hours), an unmarked track from Hutt Forks up the Western Hutt River.
- Hutt Forks - Renata Hut via Maymorn Ridge (6 hours), a partially marked track from Hutt Forks to Maymorn Junction.

Hunters with appropriate permits can hunt for deer, pigs and goats throughout the park.
