= Te Mārua =

Suburb of Upper Hutt, New Zealand

- Suburb
- Interactive map of Te Mārua
- Coordinates: 41.09785°S 175.13151°E
- Country: New Zealand
- Region: Wellington Region
- Territorial authority: Upper Hutt
- Electorates: Remutaka; Ikaroa-Rāwhiti (Māori)

Government
  - Territorial Authority: Upper Hutt City Council
  - Regional council: Greater Wellington Regional Council
  - Mayor of Upper Hutt: Peri Zee
  - Remutaka MP: Chris Hipkins
  - Ikaroa-Rāwhiti MP: Cushla Tangaere-Manuel

Area
  - Total: 5.46 km^{2} (2.11 sq mi)

Population (June 2025)
  - Total: 1,010
  - Density: 185/km^{2} (479/sq mi)

Te Mārua (previously also known as Te Marua) is the easternmost urban suburb of Upper Hutt. For reasons of location and distance from the city, the area is often classified as rural. In December 2019, the approved official geographic name of the locality was gazetted as "Te Mārua".

== Geography ==
Te Mārua is well known for its Plateau Reserve where remnants of the old Rimutaka Railway path can be found, which now form part of a historic walk. Mt Climie, the highest peak of the Remutaka Range, can also be reached from the reserve.

Te Mārua is situated on State Highway 2, and is the last significant township (and shop) on the road before it reaches the head of the Hutt Valley and crosses the Remutaka Range into the Wairarapa. Te Mārua is situated in the original floodplain of the Hutt River and parts, particularly the Golf course, have been subject to flooding.

Just north of Te Mārua is the Te Mārua water treatment plant and the twin Stuart Macaskill Lakes. Water is taken from the Hutt River at Kaitoke, and either goes directly to the treatment plant or is stored in the lakes for future use. The water treatment plant supplies 40 percent of Wellington's water requirements, including all of Upper Hutt, Manor Park and Stokes Valley in Lower Hutt, all of Porirua, and the northern and western suburbs of Wellington City.

The Mangaroa River meets Te Awa Kairangi / Hutt River at Te Mārua.

== Sport ==
The suburb is also the location of the Wellington Speedway, a nationally important venue for stock car racing. It was formerly an important motorcycle speedway venue and held a qualifying round of the Speedway World Championship and the New Zealand Solo Championship.

== Clubs ==
The Wellington Naturist Club's club grounds, venue of the historic 2016 World Congress of the International Naturist Federation.

Te Mārua residents are represented by the local community body, the Upper Hutt Rural Residents Association, and served by Maymorn railway station.

== Demographics ==
Te Mārua statistical area covers 5.46 km^{2} (2.11 sq mi). It had an estimated population of 1,010 as of June 2025, with a population density of 185 people per km^{2}.

Historical population
Year	Pop.	±% p.a.
2006	918	—
2013	969	+0.78%
2018	975	+0.12%
2023	996	+0.43%

Te Marua had a population of 996 in the 2023 New Zealand census, an increase of 21 people (2.2%) since the 2018 census, and an increase of 27 people (2.8%) since the 2013 census. There were 510 males, 483 females, and 3 people of other genders in 351 dwellings. 3.0% of people identified as LGBTIQ+. The median age was 39.7 years (compared with 38.1 years nationally). There were 204 people (20.5%) aged under 15 years, 162 (16.3%) aged 15 to 29, 492 (49.4%) aged 30 to 64, and 138 (13.9%) aged 65 or older.

People could identify as more than one ethnicity. The results were 87.3% European (Pākehā); 17.8% Māori; 5.1% Pasifika; 4.2% Asian; 0.3% Middle Eastern, Latin American and African New Zealanders (MELAA); and 2.4% other, which includes people giving their ethnicity as "New Zealander". English was spoken by 96.4%, Māori by 3.9%, Samoan by 1.2%, and other languages by 7.5%. No language could be spoken by 3.0% (e.g. too young to talk). New Zealand Sign Language was known by 1.2%. The percentage of people born overseas was 19.0, compared with 28.8% nationally.

Religious affiliations were 27.4% Christian, 0.3% Hindu, 1.8% Māori religious beliefs, 0.6% Buddhist, 0.6% New Age, and 1.2% other religions. People who answered that they had no religion were 61.4%, and 7.2% of people did not answer the census question.

Of those at least 15 years old, 162 (20.5%) people had a bachelor's or higher degree, 468 (59.1%) had a post-high school certificate or diploma, and 162 (20.5%) people exclusively held high school qualifications. The median income was $52,400, compared with $41,500 nationally. 114 people (14.4%) earned over $100,000 compared to 12.1% nationally. The employment status of those at least 15 was 483 (61.0%) full-time, 75 (9.5%) part-time, and 15 (1.9%) unemployed.

== Education ==
Plateau School, located in Te Mārua, is a co-educational state primary school for Year 1 to 6 students. It has a roll of 140 as of July 2026. It opened in 1968.

== Climate ==
Climate data for Te Mārua (1951–1980)
Month	Jan	Feb	Mar	Apr	May	Jun	Jul	Aug	Sep	Oct	Nov	Dec	Year
Mean daily maximum °C (°F)	22.8 (73.0)	22.8 (73.0)	21.0 (69.8)	18.2 (64.8)	14.7 (58.5)	12.4 (54.3)	11.6 (52.9)	12.9 (55.2)	15.1 (59.2)	17.4 (63.3)	18.9 (66.0)	21.0 (69.8)	17.4 (63.3)
Daily mean °C (°F)	17.4 (63.3)	17.6 (63.7)	15.9 (60.6)	13.7 (56.7)	10.4 (50.7)	8.5 (47.3)	7.6 (45.7)	8.7 (47.7)	10.5 (50.9)	12.6 (54.7)	14.3 (57.7)	16.0 (60.8)	12.8 (55.0)
Mean daily minimum °C (°F)	11.9 (53.4)	12.4 (54.3)	10.7 (51.3)	9.1 (48.4)	6.0 (42.8)	4.5 (40.1)	3.6 (38.5)	4.4 (39.9)	5.9 (42.6)	7.7 (45.9)	9.7 (49.5)	11.0 (51.8)	8.1 (46.5)
Average rainfall mm (inches)	93 (3.7)	79 (3.1)	91 (3.6)	107 (4.2)	142 (5.6)	120 (4.7)	135 (5.3)	104 (4.1)	103 (4.1)	82 (3.2)	101 (4.0)	94 (3.7)	1,251 (49.3)
Source: NIWA
