= Michael Hutt =

Michael Hutt may refer to:

- Michael Hutt (academic and translator)
- Michael Hutt (pathologist)
