= Kaitoke =

- Rural locality
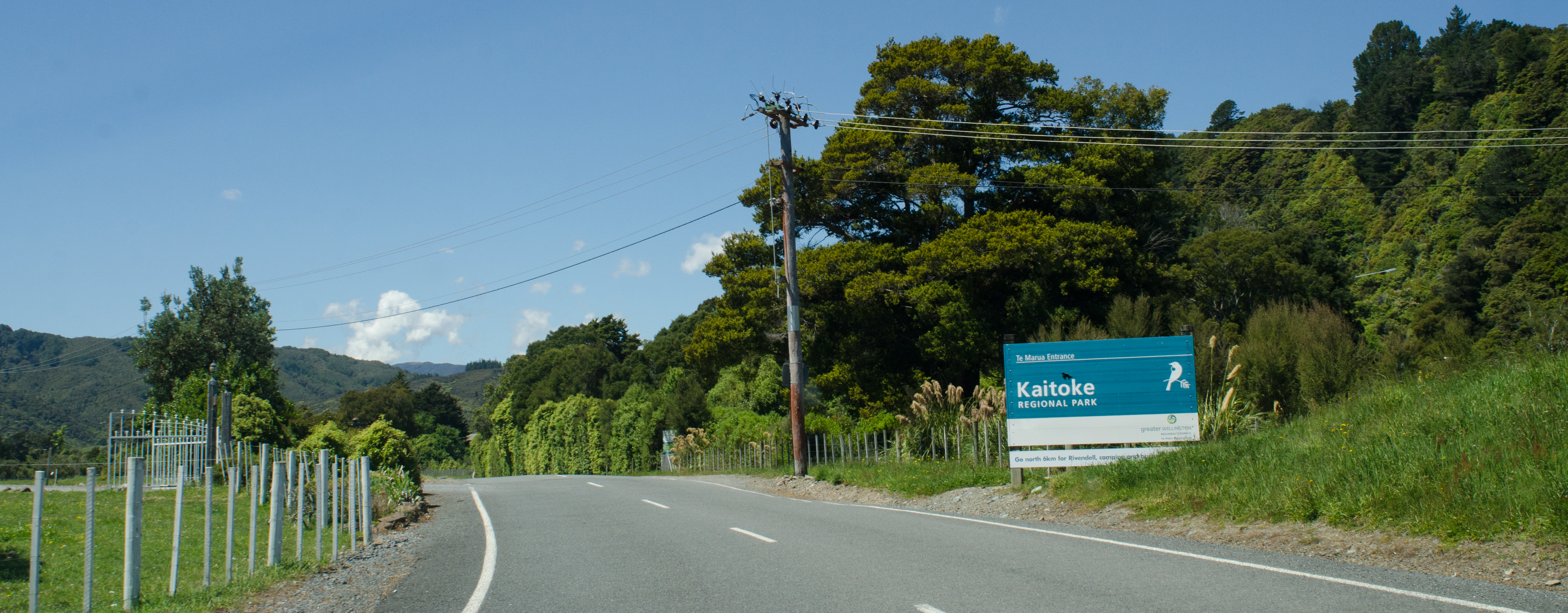
- Interactive map of Kaitoke
- Coordinates: 41°5′0.5″S 175°10′3″E
- Country: New Zealand
- Region: Wellington Region
- Territorial authority: Upper Hutt
- Electorates: Remutaka; Ikaroa-Rāwhiti (Māori)

Government
  - Territorial Authority: Upper Hutt City Council
  - Regional council: Greater Wellington Regional Council
  - Mayor of Upper Hutt: Peri Zee
  - Remutaka MP: Chris Hipkins
  - Ikaroa-Rāwhiti MP: Cushla Tangaere-Manuel

Population (2023 census)
  - Total: 306

Kaitoke (sometimes called Pakuratahi), part of Upper Hutt City, is a locality in the southern North Island of New Zealand. It is located at the northern end of the Hutt Valley, 45 kilometres northeast of Wellington City and six kilometres from the northern end of the Upper Hutt urban area. It also lies at the southern end of the Tararua Ranges.

The New Zealand Ministry for Culture and Heritage gives a translation of "eat worms" for Kaitoke.

The first Youth Hostel in the North Island was established in the old Ministry of Works barracks at Kaitoke, which were behind the Post Office and alongside the Kaitoke Hall. The Post Office, the Hall, and the Youth Hostel were the only buildings of the settlement.

The Pākuratahi River flows through the eastern Kaitoke Basin from its source in the Remutaka Ranges. The old route of the Wairarapa Line railway, which closed with the opening of the Rimutaka Tunnel in November 1955, ran from Upper Hutt via Maymorn to Kaitoke and around Goat Rock up the Pakuratahi to the Summit, and from there, because of excessive steepness, the Fell mountain railway system was used to aid trains on the Rimutaka Incline between Summit and Cross Creek. This railway is now the Remutaka Rail Trail. The Hutt River has its source to the north of Kaitoke, and much of the land in the vicinity is used as a water supply reserve. Filming, rafting, swimming and other human activity all take place downstream of the water intake.

== Demographics ==
Kaitoke locality covers 24.62 km^{2} (9.51 sq mi), and is split between Akatarawa and Mangaroa statistical areas..

Historical population
Year	Pop.	±% p.a.
2013	243	—
2018	258	+1.21%
2023	306	+3.47%

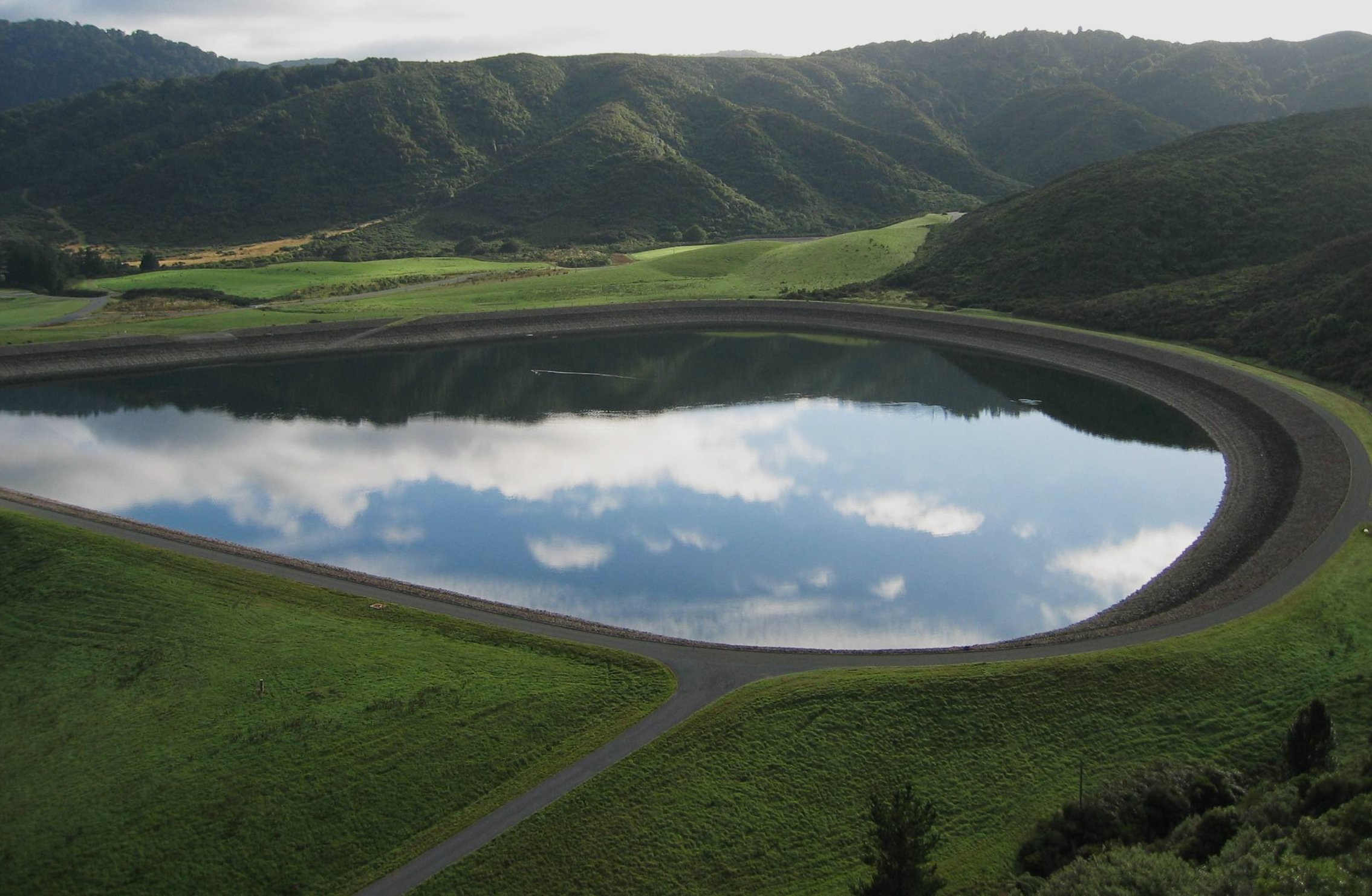
The upper Stuart Macaskill reservoir.

Kaitoke had a population of 306 in the 2023 New Zealand census, an increase of 48 people (18.6%) since the 2018 census, and an increase of 63 people (25.9%) since the 2013 census. There were 147 males and 153 females in 108 dwellings. 3.9% of people identified as LGBTIQ+. There were 63 people (20.6%) aged under 15 years, 54 (17.6%) aged 15 to 29, 147 (48.0%) aged 30 to 64, and 36 (11.8%) aged 65 or older.

People could identify as more than one ethnicity. The results were 91.2% European (Pākehā); 12.7% Māori; 3.9% Pasifika; 4.9% Asian; 1.0% Middle Eastern, Latin American and African New Zealanders (MELAA); and 5.9% other, which includes people giving their ethnicity as "New Zealander". English was spoken by 97.1%, Māori by 2.9%, and other languages by 9.8%. No language could be spoken by 2.0% (e.g. too young to talk). New Zealand Sign Language was known by 1.0%. The percentage of people born overseas was 17.6, compared with 28.8% nationally.

Religious affiliations were 20.6% Christian, 1.0% Islam, and 1.0% other religions. People who answered that they had no religion were 69.6%, and 6.9% of people did not answer the census question.

Of those at least 15 years old, 45 (18.5%) people had a bachelor's or higher degree, 147 (60.5%) had a post-high school certificate or diploma, and 42 (17.3%) people exclusively held high school qualifications. 45 people (18.5%) earned over $100,000 compared to 12.1% nationally. The employment status of those at least 15 was 150 (61.7%) full-time, 27 (11.1%) part-time, and 3 (1.2%) unemployed.

== Recreation ==
Kaitoke Regional Park has a range of facilities that attracts picnics, hiking, horse riding, swimming, camping and weddings. The park includes a filming location for exterior shots of Rivendell for the movie The Lord of the Rings: The Fellowship of the Ring.

The "Puffer" tramping track providing access into the Tararua Forest Park climbs from Kaitoke onto and along the Marchant Ridge. Merchant Ridge is the part of the Tararuas that is prominently visible from Wellington. The Marchant Track has a side track leading to the Tauherenikau Valley. The end of the Marchant Ridge (after four hours of 'up hill, all the way, both ways') leads to Mount Alpha, and onto The Southern Crossing. The entire track to Alpha skirts the Hutt Water Collection Area.

The Remutaka Rail Trail where people cycle and walk is accessed from Kaitoke. Other facilities included a small airstrip operated by the Upper Valley Gliding Club for the purposes of gliding the area's thermals. The Upper Valley Gliding Club closed in the mid 2020s. There is a mixed sport gun range called Kaitoke Range Complex that is used by the Wellington Service Rifle Association, the Historical Arms Association and the Green Mountain Boys Cowboy Action Shooting Club. There is a motorsport karting track since the 1970s run by KartSport Wellington.

== Climate ==
Climate data for Kaitoke (1991–2020 normals, extremes 1966–1998)
Month	Jan	Feb	Mar	Apr	May	Jun	Jul	Aug	Sep	Oct	Nov	Dec	Year
Record high °C (°F)	29.0 (84.2)	30.4 (86.7)	29.0 (84.2)	26.0 (78.8)	21.6 (70.9)	17.9 (64.2)	19.0 (66.2)	17.2 (63.0)	22.1 (71.8)	22.6 (72.7)	26.1 (79.0)	28.7 (83.7)	30.4 (86.7)
Mean daily maximum °C (°F)	20.6 (69.1)	21.3 (70.3)	19.4 (66.9)	17.0 (62.6)	14.6 (58.3)	11.8 (53.2)	11.6 (52.9)	12.1 (53.8)	13.6 (56.5)	15.2 (59.4)	16.8 (62.2)	19.1 (66.4)	16.1 (61.0)
Daily mean °C (°F)	15.9 (60.6)	16.2 (61.2)	14.4 (57.9)	11.9 (53.4)	10.1 (50.2)	7.9 (46.2)	7.4 (45.3)	7.6 (45.7)	9.4 (48.9)	10.6 (51.1)	11.9 (53.4)	14.5 (58.1)	11.5 (52.7)
Mean daily minimum °C (°F)	11.2 (52.2)	11.0 (51.8)	9.3 (48.7)	6.8 (44.2)	5.5 (41.9)	3.9 (39.0)	3.2 (37.8)	3.1 (37.6)	5.1 (41.2)	5.9 (42.6)	7.0 (44.6)	9.8 (49.6)	6.8 (44.3)
Record low °C (°F)	0.8 (33.4)	−2.0 (28.4)	−3.5 (25.7)	−4.6 (23.7)	−4.4 (24.1)	−6.5 (20.3)	−5.7 (21.7)	−6.3 (20.7)	−4.0 (24.8)	−3.9 (25.0)	−2.5 (27.5)	−1.0 (30.2)	−6.5 (20.3)
Average rainfall mm (inches)	116.8 (4.60)	133.9 (5.27)	131.7 (5.19)	178.9 (7.04)	120.8 (4.76)	210.3 (8.28)	237.5 (9.35)	210.8 (8.30)	202.6 (7.98)	300.6 (11.83)	235.7 (9.28)	148.1 (5.83)	2,227.7 (87.71)
Mean monthly sunshine hours	223.4	184.5	159.7	140.4	100.0	62.0	84.3	102.2	119.1	157.8	150.7	177.4	1,661.5
Source: NIWA (sun 1981–2010)
