= William Hutt =

William Hutt may refer to:

- Sir William Hutt (politician) (1801–1882), British politician
- William Harold Hutt (1899–1988), British economist
- William Hutt (actor) (1920–2007) Canadian actor
