= Pākuratahi River =

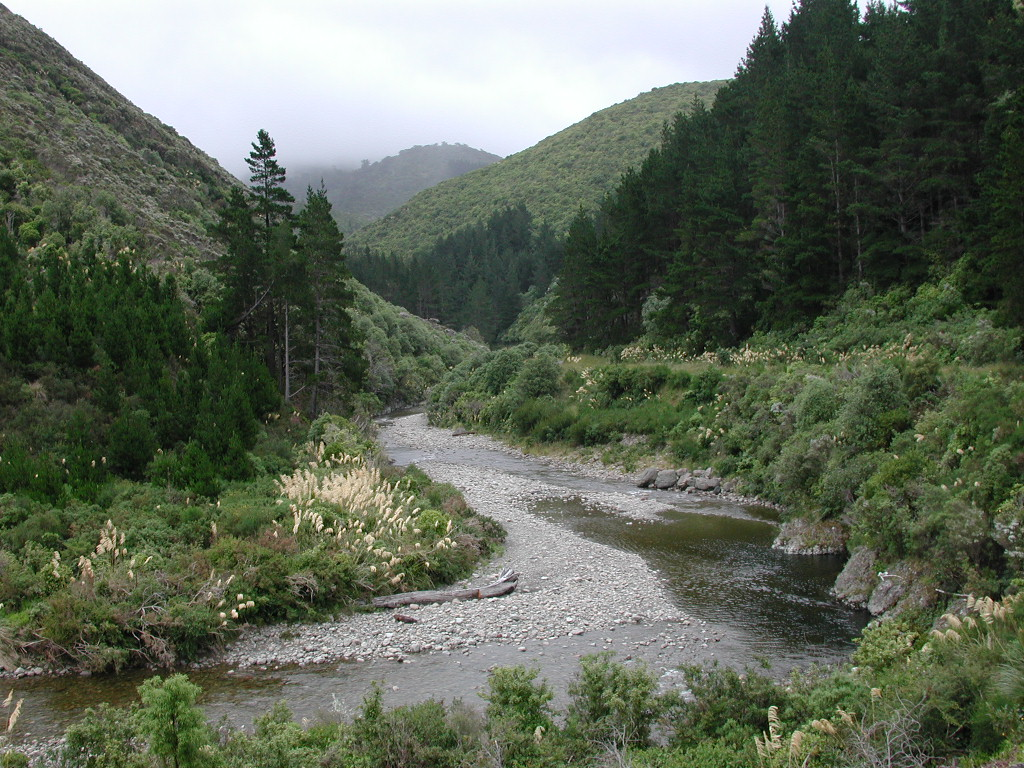
- View of the Pākuratahi River past Ladle Bend
- Route of the Pākuratahi River
- Mouth of the Pākuratahi River Pākuratahi River (North Island)
- Native name: Pākuratahi (Māori)

Location
- Country: New Zealand
- Island: North Island
- Region: Wellington
- District: Upper Hutt

Physical characteristics
- Source: Remutaka Range
  - location: Pākuratahi Forks
  - coordinates: 41.20859°S 175.1116°E
- Mouth: Te Awa Kairangi / Hutt River
  - coordinates: 41°03′24″S 175°11′34″E
- Length: 23 km (14 mi)
- Basin size: 81 km^{2} (31 sq mi)

Basin features
- Progression: Pākuratahi River → Te Awa Kairangi / Hutt River → Wellington Harbour → Cook Strait → Pacific Ocean
- Tributaries
  - left: Redington Stream, Climie Creek, Munitions Bend Creek, Remutaka Stream, Kaitoke Stream
  - right: Ladle Bend Creek, Puffer Creek, Farm Creek
- Bridges: Pākuratahi Truss Bridge, Gilbert Road bridge, Pākuratahi River Bridge (State Highway 2), Waterworks Road bridge, Pākuratahi River Walk footbridge, Strainer House Road bridge

The Pākuratahi River, previously the Pakuratahi River, is a river of the Wellington Region of New Zealand's North Island. It flows northwest from its source in the Remutaka Range 15 kilometres (9 mi) east of Lower Hutt to join the Te Awa Kairangi / Hutt River near Kaitoke.

== Etymology ==
The name Pākuratahi literally means "first pūkeko" in Māori. In December 2019, the approved official geographic name of the river was gazetted as "Pākuratahi River".

== Geography ==
The Pākuratahi River rises in the northeastern Remutaka Ranges, and is a tributary of Te Awa Kairangi / Hutt River. It flows through a tectonic basin, and a greywacke gorge before meeting Te Awa Kairangi / Hutt River at Kaitoke.

Much of the river catchment is found within Kaitoke Regional Park and Pākuratahi Forest regional park. 80% of the river's catchment is formed by native forest and scrublands, with a small area of managed pine forests, with very little urban development.

== History ==
The Pākuratahi River was traditionally sparsely settled by Māori, due to the river being significantly inland and far away from coastal resources. Until the mid-19th century, the valley was a dense podocarp forest dominated by kahikatea, pukatea, rimu and tōtara trees. The river valley formed a part of a trail used by Māori linking Wellington Harbour and the Wairarapa over the Remutaka Range. Originally navigable by waka from the coast, the river ceased being navigable after seismic activity in 1855. The tangata whenua of the river catchment are Te Āti Awa, who arrived in the region in the mid-19th century following Ngāti Ira's movement to the Wairarapa.

By the late 1850s, the Benge family established a sawmill near the Pākuratahi River, leading to significant felling of Pākuratahi River catchment forests in the latter 19th century, and areas of the lower river catchment being converted into farmland. Large fires in the late 1920s and mid-1930s destroyed large areas of native forest near the Pākuratahi River. Until the 1930s, the Maymorn Timber Company operated a sawmill near the area, which included a tramway that operated near the Pākuratahi River.

The Pākuratahi River Bridge opened in 1971 as a section of State Highway 2.

== Biodiversity ==
Marine species known to occur in the river include endemic species such as cran's bully, bluegill bully, redfin bully, New Zealand longfin eels, short-finned eels, Galaxias divergens and kōura, alongside introduced brown trout.

== Recreation ==
The Pākuratahi River Walk is a nature walk through Kaitoke Regional Park, which begins at the Kaitoke Regional Park campground and heads towards Pākuratahi Forks, the point where the Pākuratahi River reaches Te Awa Kairangi / Hutt River. This area was used for filming the Elvish village of Rivendell in the Lord of the Rings film trilogy. Other recreational pursuits on the river include picnicking, camping and kayaking.

== Gallery ==
Pākuratahi Truss Bridge

River seen from the Remutaka Rail Trail

== See also ==
- List of rivers of Wellington Region
- List of rivers of New Zealand
