= Western Hutt River =

- Route of the Western Hutt River
- Mouth of the Western Hutt River Western Hutt River (North Island)

Location
- Country: New Zealand
- Island: North Island
- Region: Wellington
- District: Upper Hutt

Physical characteristics
- Source: Tararua Range
  - location: Aston
  - coordinates: 40.97206°S 175.26017°E
- Mouth: Te Awa Kairangi / Hutt River
  - location: Hutt Forks
  - coordinates: 41°02′25″S 175°13′01″E
- Length: 14 km (8.7 mi)

Basin features
- Progression: Western Hutt River → Te Awa Kairangi / Hutt River → Wellington Harbour → Cook Strait → Pacific Ocean
- Tributaries
  - right: Renata Stream

The Western Hutt River is a river of New Zealand. It flows generally southwards from the Tararua Range to join with the Eastern Hutt River and become Te Awa Kairangi / Hutt River, a major river of the southern North Island.

== See also ==
- List of rivers of Wellington Region
- List of rivers of New Zealand
