= Waiwhetu Aquifer =

Aquifer in Wellington, New Zealand

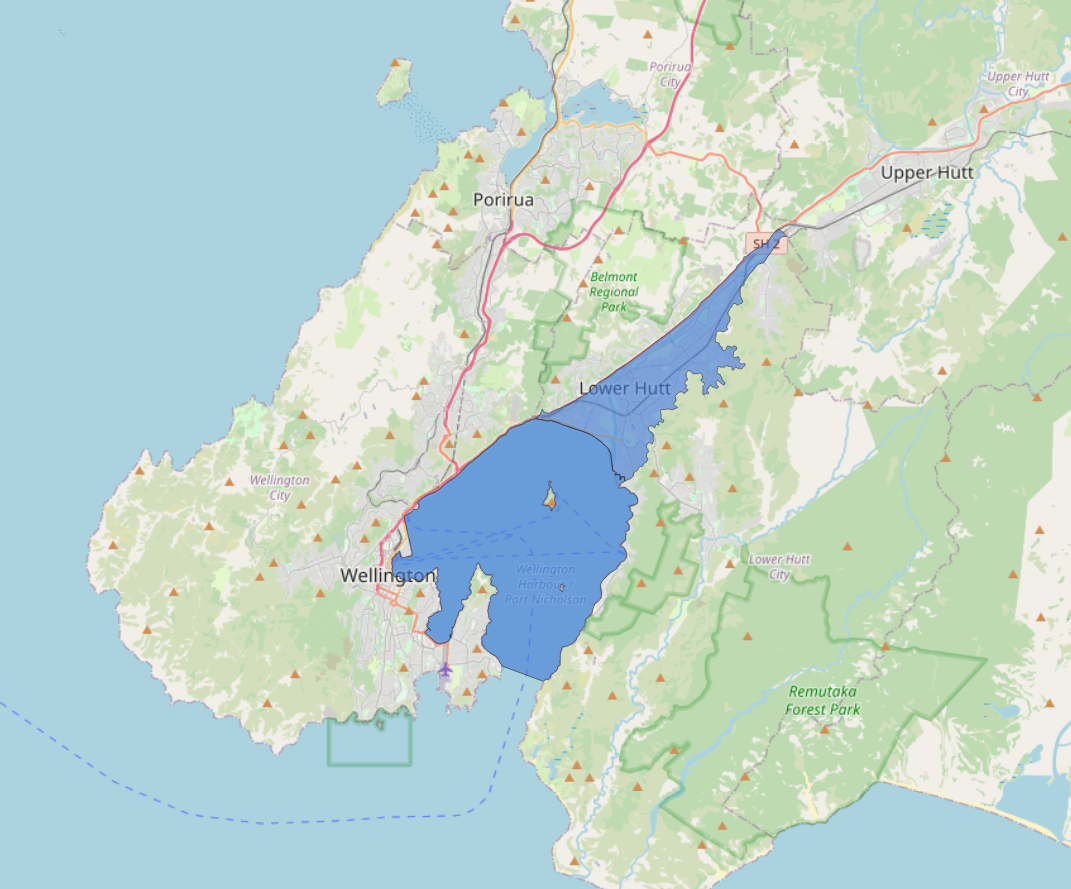
- Map showing extent of aquifer
- Interactive map of Waiwhetu Aquifer
- Location: Wellington Harbour
- Coordinates: 41.233°S 174.891°E
- Type: Aquifer
- Primary inflows: Hutt River

The Waiwhetu artesian aquifer, sometimes referred to as the Hutt aquifer, is a pressurized zone of water-retaining sand, gravel and boulders beneath the Hutt Valley and Wellington Harbour in New Zealand. The aquifer provides about 40% of the public fresh water supply for Lower Hutt and Wellington city. Water from the Hutt River begins to flow underground south from Taita Gorge, then becomes pressurized under a seal of clay. Water is extracted from the pressurized area for public use, but concerns about overuse and damage by earthquakes have led to investigations of alternative sources of fresh water.

== Formation and location ==
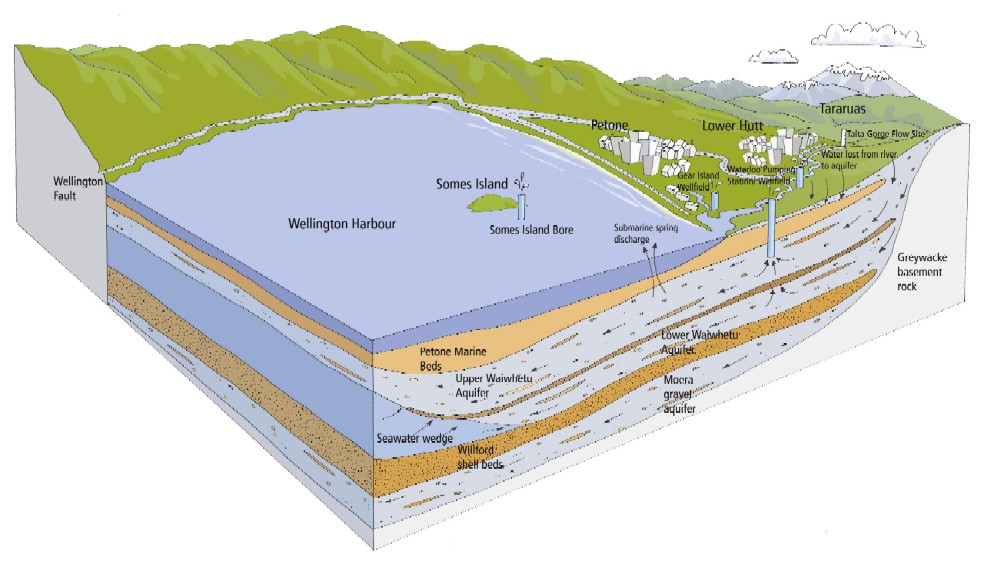
3-D cross-sectional illustration of the aquifer

The Waiwhetu aquifer covers a wedge-shaped area of 75 km² under the Hutt Valley and Wellington Harbour, and by size is the fifth-largest in New Zealand.

The harbour basin contains massive quantities of gravel washed down from the Hutt River, in some places hundreds of metres deep. Above the gravel is a layer of mud and silt which seals fresh water within the gravel, creating an artesian aquifer. There are several aquifers in the area in different layers underground, but the Waiwhetu aquifer is the largest and most productive one. Water flows down into the aquifer from a five-kilometre stretch of the Hutt River south of Taita Gorge, at the rate of 1000 litres per second. Rainwater also contributes to the aquifer. South of Melling the aquifer becomes pressurized by the layer of mud and silt above the gravel layer holding the water in, meaning that if a bore is sunk into the aquifer, water will rise up the pipe.

Water from the aquifer also reaches the surface through natural springs at various places around the harbour. In 2023, NIWA released the results of a project investigating the harbour floor. Instead of drilling, researchers used a combination of techniques including seawater sampling, acoustic measurements, visual observation via remote operated vehicles and sea floor sampling. Researchers discovered that the seafloor contains hundreds of depressions, known as 'pockmarks'. These vary in size from three metres to over 500 metres (1,600 ft) wide and up to 10 metres (33 ft) deep, and are the source of several hundred freshwater springs. Comparing the new data to previous studies, researchers determined that the pockmarks are long-lasting rather than temporary features.

Pressure within the aquifer stops sea water from getting into the aquifer. Once in the aquifer, the water moves slowly. It takes several years for water in the underground aquifer to reach Waterloo from the Taita Gorge, about 10 years to reach the Petone foreshore and 20 years to get as far as Matiu / Somes Island. The water level in Wellington Harbour was much lower 20,000 years ago, and the ancient Hutt River used to flow down a paleochannel to the east of Matiu / Somes Island as far as the present-day Miramar Peninsula. Much of the water in the Waiwhetu aquifer moves under the sea bed from the direction of the Hutt River to the Falcon Shoals area (between Karaka Bay and Worser Bay) at the harbour mouth via the paleochannel. The characteristics of the aquifer between Matiu / Somes Island and the harbour mouth are not as well studied as the portion to the north of the island. NIWA's 2023 study stated that the southern limit of the aquifer is still debatable, but thought to be around the Falcon Shoals.

== Extraction ==
Wellington Water manages the water supply for Wellington and the Hutt Valley. The Waiwhetu aquifer provides water to 150,000 people in Wellington and Hutt City. This is around 40 percent of the Wellington region's annual water supply, and up to 70 percent in summer months.

From the 1880s, residents and businesses in the Hutt Valley and Petone area sank wells into the aquifer for fresh water, and in 1908 Lower Hutt Borough introduced a public water supply fed from artesian bores. Wellington and Lower Hutt also built dams and used water taken from rivers. Over the years, bores and pumping stations have been installed in various areas in the Hutt Valley. For example, a bore field and pumping station were built near Hutt Park in 1946-47. This closed in 1981 after Waterloo was built. Another pumping station was built at Buick Street in Petone in 1963 after water supply from the Korokoro Stream deteriorated. It was shut down in 1999.

=== Gear Island ===
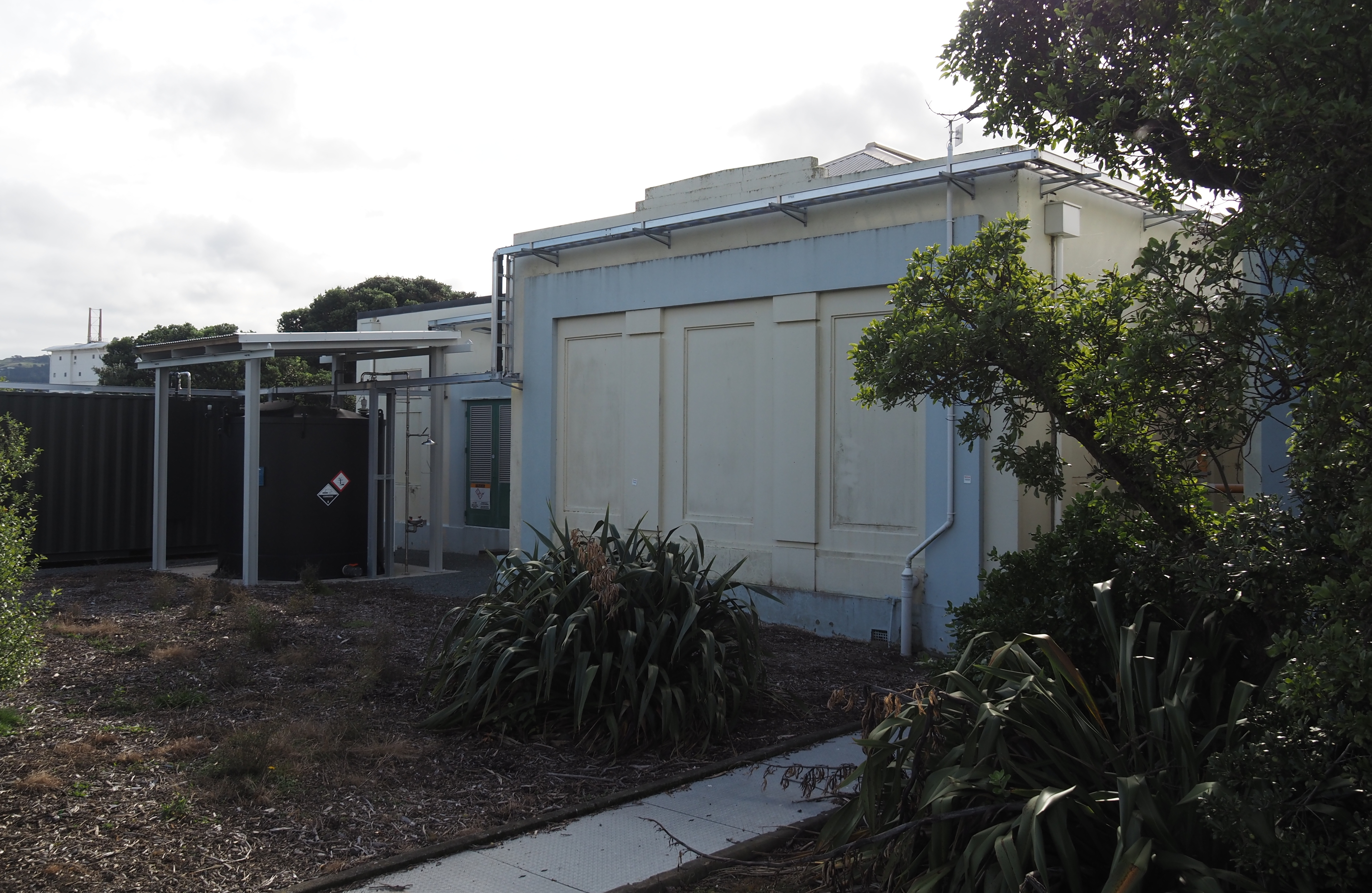
Gear Island water treatment plant

After several years of negotiations in the 1930s between the councils of Lower Hutt, Petone and Wellington, Wellington City Council gained the right to sink bores and build a pumping station at Gear Island. Gear Island pumping station opened in 1936, sending artesian water into a water main that also brought water from the Orongorongo River in Wainuiomata to Wellington city. Water from Gear Island was only used infrequently, to supplement Wellington's supply in periods of high demand. Gear Island was upgraded in 1976-77, served by three new bores on the Shandon Golf Course. Fluoridation was also introduced at that time. Since 1999, Gear Island has been maintained as a standby plant, run occasionally to maintain its operational status in case it is needed.

=== Waterloo ===
The Waterloo pumping station opened in 1981. In the 1980s, eight bores drawing from the aquifer were put in along Knights Road and nearby streets in Lower Hutt (known as the 'Knights Road spine'), and these feed into the Waterloo pumping station for treatment and public distribution as drinking water. The Waterloo plant serves Hutt Central, Naenae, the Western Hills, Eastbourne, Gracefield and Petone. Water is also sent into the main from Wainuiomata that goes via Gear Island to Wellington.

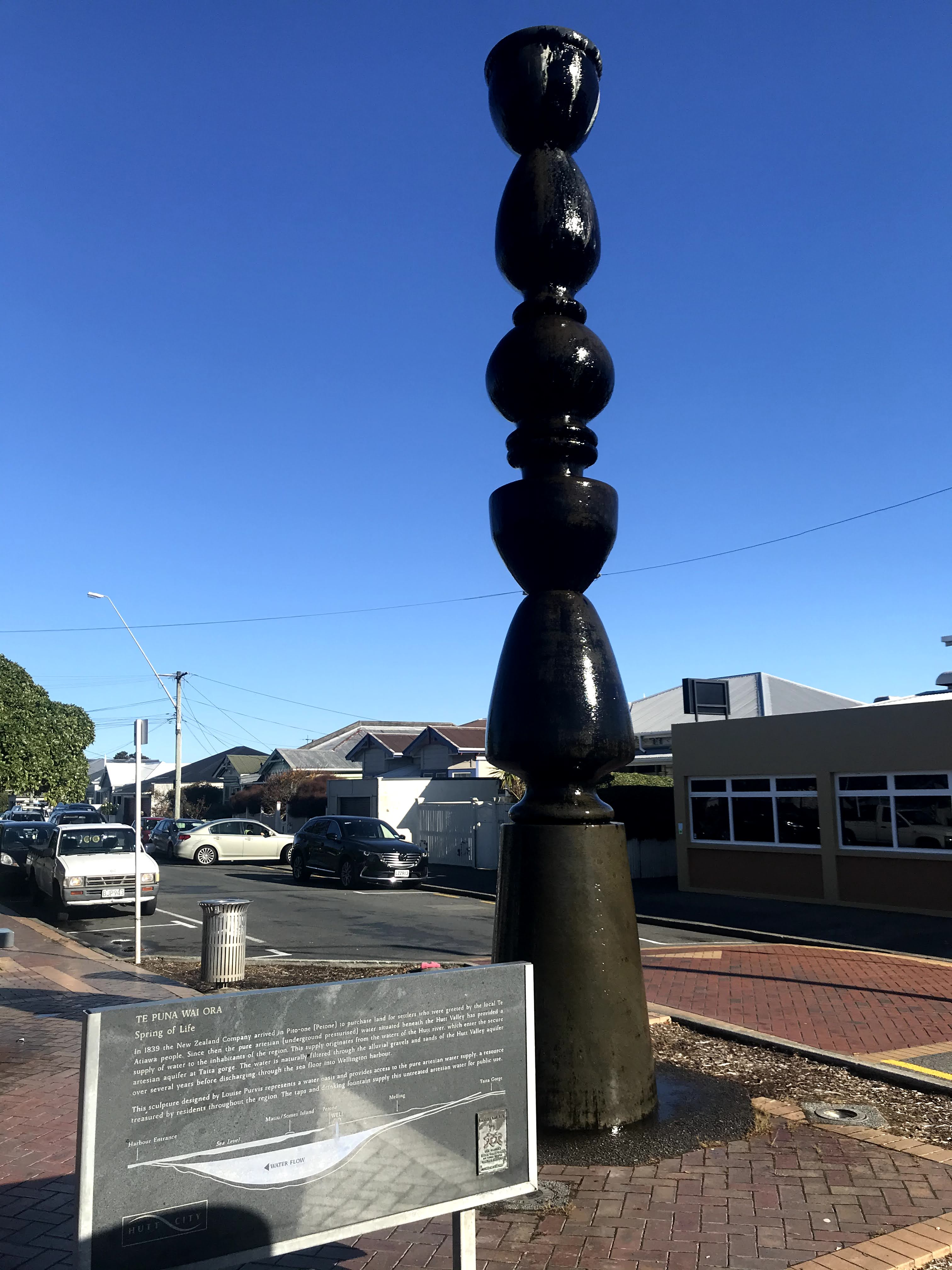
The Te Puna Wai Ora fountain flows with water from the Waiwhetu aquifer

=== Other bores ===
There is a bore at Hutt Hospital for use in emergencies. Other bores into the aquifer are used mainly for industrial purposes. A 2014 report identified 13 private bores in the Hutt Valley and Petone area, five of which had consents to take 1,000 cubic metres or more of water from the aquifer each day.At the time of its sale in 2014, the Unilever soap factory in Petone had consent to take 900,000 cubic metres of water from the aquifer each year.

In 2017, Hutt City Council granted Waiwhetu Marae $150,000 to install a bore, and the bore was opened for use in 2020. This bore is unchlorinated, but treated with UV light.

Two other bores provide free unchlorinated water from the aquifer direct to the public. One is at the Dowse Art Museum in Lower Hutt, where a small park with a water feature was created in 2012, and the other is Te Puna Wai Ora (Spring of Life) in Buick Street, Petone, built in 2003.

Moore Wilson's produce store in Wellington has an artesian bore that provided water to the public. It closed temporarily in 2017, after arsenic was detected in the water. Water in this bore comes from about 152 m deep, and the company states that it is believed to come from the Wairarapa. It is not connected to the Waiwhetu aquifer.

== Water treatment ==
Lime is added to aquifer water coming in to the Waterloo station, to adjust its pH level so that the pipes are not damaged. Apart from this, prior to 2016, water from the aquifer was not treated because its long period filtering underground meant the water was free from bacteria and viruses. Water from the aquifer going to Wellington (but not the Hutt) was treated with chlorine as it mixed with chlorinated water coming from Wainuiomata and passed through the Gear Island pumping station. Water from the aquifer going to 74,000 people in Petone, Hutt Central, Naenae and Eastbourne was not chlorinated.

In August 2016 there was a major outbreak of gastroenteritis in Havelock North caused by public water supply contamination. As a precautionary measure, Wellington Water responded by changing its regime of water testing from the Waiwhetu aquifer. On 1 December 2016, routine testing of water from a bore on the Knights Road spine showed contamination with e. coli, the first time since 1980 that a positive test had occurred. The water supply was temporarily chlorinated while further tests were carried out. It was suspected that the contamination was a result of ground disturbance caused by the Kaikōura earthquake on 14 November, but an investigation by Wellington Water did not reach a firm conclusion. Tests at other bore locations in February and April 2017 also returned results positive for e. coli. After comprehensive testing and investigation, Greater Wellington Regional Council decided to continue chlorination permanently and install UV filters at the Waterloo plant.

In April 2017 the unchlorinated bore supply available to the public at Te Puna Wai Ora and the Dowse Art Museum were shut down after returning positive results. These were reopened to the public after a system of filtering the water and treating it with UV light was installed.

A new pipe system for water diversion was also installed along Knights Road, through Lower Hutt to the harbour, completed by the end of 2017. The project won an award from Civil Contractors NZ Wellington/Wairarapa.

== Protection ==
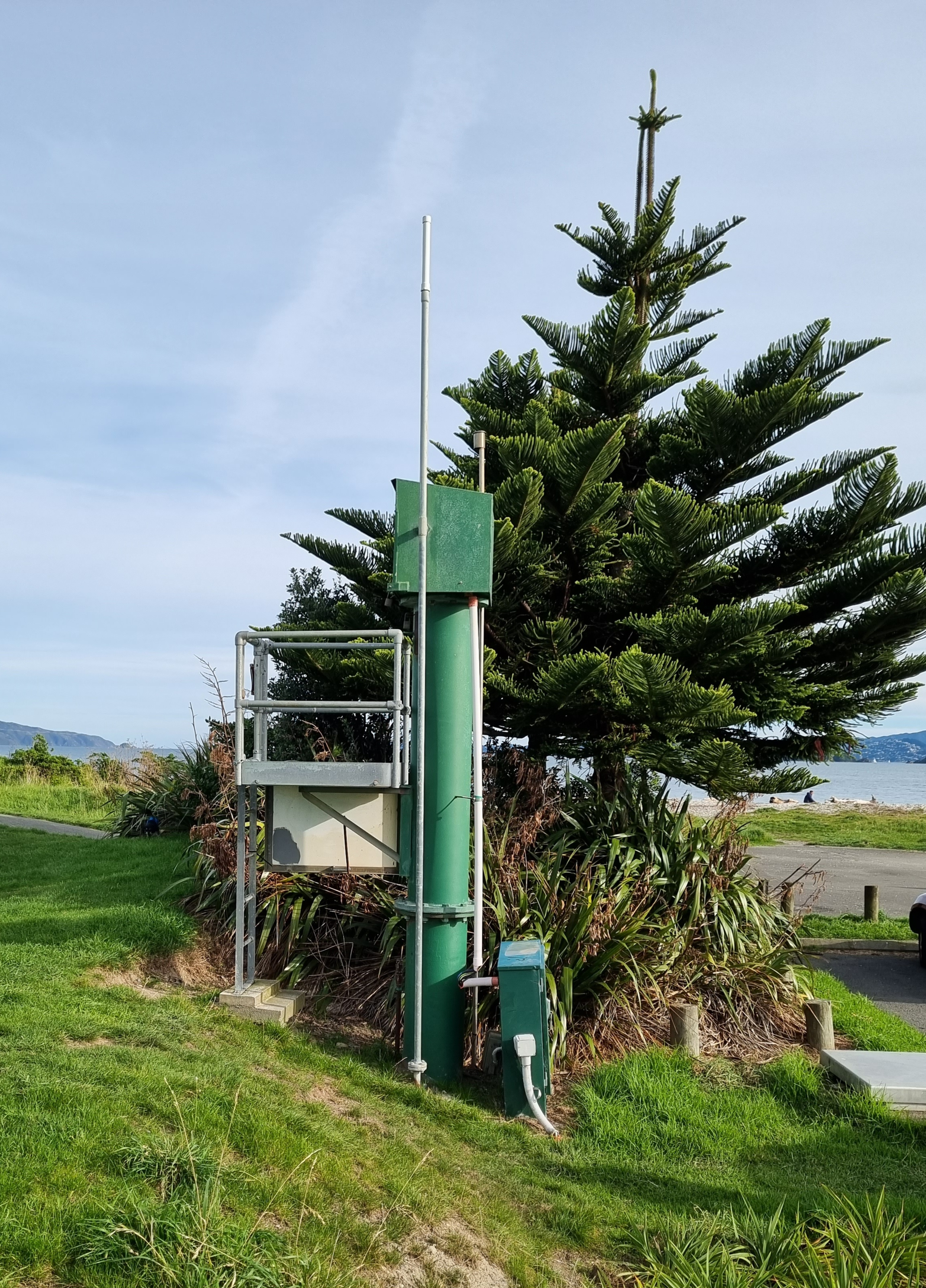
Water level monitoring bore at McEwan Park, Petone foreshore

Water pressure within the aquifer keeps sea water out, but the pressure can drop due to too much water being extracted, or due to less water in the aquifer in dry spells when the Hutt River and rainfall are low. If the pressure drops then sea water may get into the aquifer via vents on the harbour floor. This is known as saline intrusion, and could make water in the aquifer undrinkable. Greater Wellington Regional Council controls the amount of water extracted and monitors the level of water in the aquifer (and therefore the pressure) with three bores on the Petone foreshore, and others further inland in the Hutt Valley. If the water level drops, extraction can be reduced. There are three warning levels. The first warning level (2.5 metres above mean sea level) is reached regularly during summer. Water has fallen to the second level (2.3 metres above mean sea level) for short periods several times since 2002, and in March 2016 water in the aquifer briefly got as low as the third level (2 metres above mean sea level). Matiu / Somes Island gets its fresh water from a bore sunk into the aquifer just off shore at the main wharf. In February 2016 the Department of Conservation temporarily restricted visitor access to the island because the long dry summer had lowered the volume and pressure of water in the aquifer, necessitating strict water conservation. The lowest recorded water level in the aquifer occurred in the summer of 1973, when the water level sank to 1.19 m above mean sea level and sea water started to enter the aquifer.

Apart from the risk that over-extraction could lower the pressure in the aquifer and cause saline intrusion, other activities which threaten the aquifer include accidental piercing of the aquifer, dredging and disturbances to the sea floor caused by shipping movements. For example, in 1929, workers driving piles for a wharf at Point Howard pierced the aquifer, causing a large spring to form. The spring was so strong that a diver sent to investigate had trouble approaching the hole. Dredging activities at the mouth of the Hutt River in 1937 caused a severe drop in pressure in the aquifer throughout the Hutt Valley. Pressure was restored by filling the hole made by the dredging with excavated material, and with material carried down the river by flooding. In 2000, a study of the aquifer raised the possibility that the Lynx, a fast ferry, was disturbing the sea bed near the Falcon Shoals and thus causing water to leak from the aquifer. In 2015 CentrePort, which manages shipping in the harbour, proposed to dredge a 7km-long channel at the mouth of the harbour to enable large container ships to visit. This might have affected the aquifer. The project was later cancelled.

== Future proofing ==
Responding to the November 2016 Kaikōura earthquake, in 2017 Wellington Water began a project drilling into the harbour bed to look for fresh water that might supply the city in an emergency. After exploratory drilling, two bores were drilled into the Waiwhetu aquifer and the Moera aquifer which lies in a deeper layer below it. The first bore was put in about 800 metres from the Miramar peninsula, and the second was about halfway between the peninsula and Eastbourne, to the south of Matiu / Somes Island. Although fresh water was found, the investigation concluded that the quantity and quality of the water was not suitable for an emergency supply for Wellington. Instead, a cross-harbour pipeline became the preferred option.

== See also ==
- Water supply and sanitation in the Wellington Region
- Water supply in the Wellington Region
- Wellington Water
- Water services reform programme
