= Eastern Hutt River =

- Route of the Eastern Hutt River
- Mouth of the Eastern Hutt River Eastern Hutt River (North Island)

Location
- Country: New Zealand
- Island: North Island
- Region: Wellington
- District: Upper Hutt

Physical characteristics
- Source: Tararua Range
  - location: Between Omega and Hells Gate
  - coordinates: 40.98929°S 175.30386°E
- Mouth: Te Awa Kairangi / Hutt River
  - location: Hutt Forks
  - coordinates: 41°02′26″S 175°13′02″E
- Length: 11 km (6.8 mi)

Basin features
- Progression: Eastern Hutt River → Te Awa Kairangi / Hutt River → Wellington Harbour → Cook Strait → Pacific Ocean
- Tributaries
  - left: Phillips Stream
  - right: Quoin Stream
- Bridges: Eastern Hutt swingbridge

The Eastern Hutt River is a river of New Zealand. It flows southwest from the Tararua Range to join with the Western Hutt River and become Te Awa Kairangi / Hutt River, a major river of the southern North Island.

== See also ==
- List of rivers of Wellington Region
- List of rivers of New Zealand
