= Hutt Valley =

Valley in Greater Wellington, New Zealand

Coordinates: 41.1657°S 174.973°E

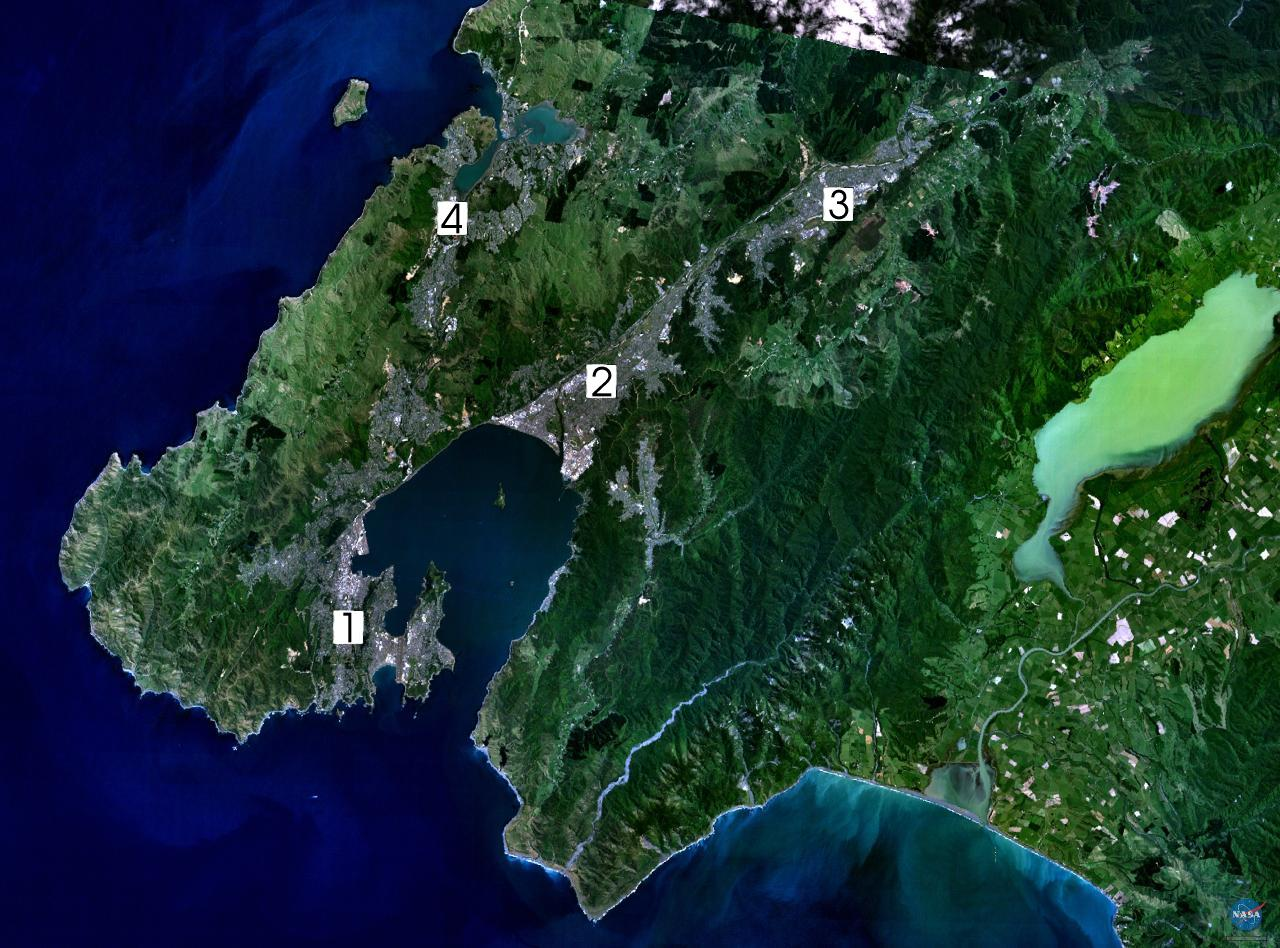
Lower and Upper Hutt cities are marked as 2 and 3 in this satellite image of the Wellington area (composite landsat-7 image)

Location of Hutt Valley

The Hutt Valley (or 'The Hutt') is the large area of fairly flat land in the Hutt River valley in the Wellington Region of New Zealand. Like the river that flows through it, it takes its name from Sir William Hutt, a director of the New Zealand Company in early colonial New Zealand.

The river flows roughly along the course of an active geologic fault, which continues to the south to become the main instrument responsible for the uplift of the South Island's Southern Alps. For this reason, the land rises abruptly to the west of the river; to the east two floodplains have developed. The higher of these is between 15–22 km (9.3–13.7 mi) from the mouth of the river. Beyond this, the river is briefly confined by a steep-sided gorge near Taitā, before the land opens up into a long triangular plain close to the outflow into Wellington Harbour.

The Waiwhetu Aquifer is formed from water seeping underground from the Hutt River near Taitā. It flows underground down the Hutt Valley and out under Wellington Harbour.

== Human settlement ==
Some early Māori nations (iwi) of the region were Ngāi Tara, Muaūpoko, Rangitāne, Ngāti Apa ki te Rā Tō and Ngāti Ira. These iwi descended from the sons of Whātonga, Taraika and Tautoki-ihu-nui-a-Whātonga, who migrated through the lower North Island with some descendants settling in the Hutt Valley. The name Heretaunga is often applied to the Hutt Valley from the name of the 'house of Whātonga at Nukutaurua village (pā)'.

In 1846 there was fighting between Māori tribes and the British, known as the Hutt Valley Campaign.

The Hutt River also has the name Te Awa Kairangi, and was a major arterial route for Māori. There was a trail linking Wellington Harbour and the Wairarapa over the Remutaka Range and through Pākuratahi river. Before the 1855 Wairarapa earthquake large Māori boats (waka) could travel as far Pākuratahi river, and European ships could also go up the valley 'almost' to Silverstream.

The lower valley contains the city of Lower Hutt, administered by Hutt City Council, while the adjacent, larger but less populous city of Upper Hutt has its centre on the smaller plain above the Taita Gorge. The valley forms a major dormitory suburban area for Wellington, and is a location for manufacturing and heavy industry, educational and recreational facilities, and the region's motor camps.

Petone, on the Wellington Harbour shoreline, was proposed as the initial site for the settlement of Wellington by the New Zealand Company. However, as the chosen site was soon seen to be prone to river flooding, early settlement was relocated to Wellington. A small settlement remained at the Petone site as the whole valley was believed to be well suited as farm land.

Almost the whole valley was clearfelled and converted to pasture or market gardens before the urbanisation of the 20th century. A small remnant of the early podocarp forest is preserved in Barton's Bush in Upper Hutt.

== Notable people ==
- William Swainson (1789–1855), ornithologist, malacologist, conchologist and entomologist died in Hutt Valley
