= Hutt River (New Zealand) =

River in New Zealand

Hutt River Te Wai o Orutu (Māori)
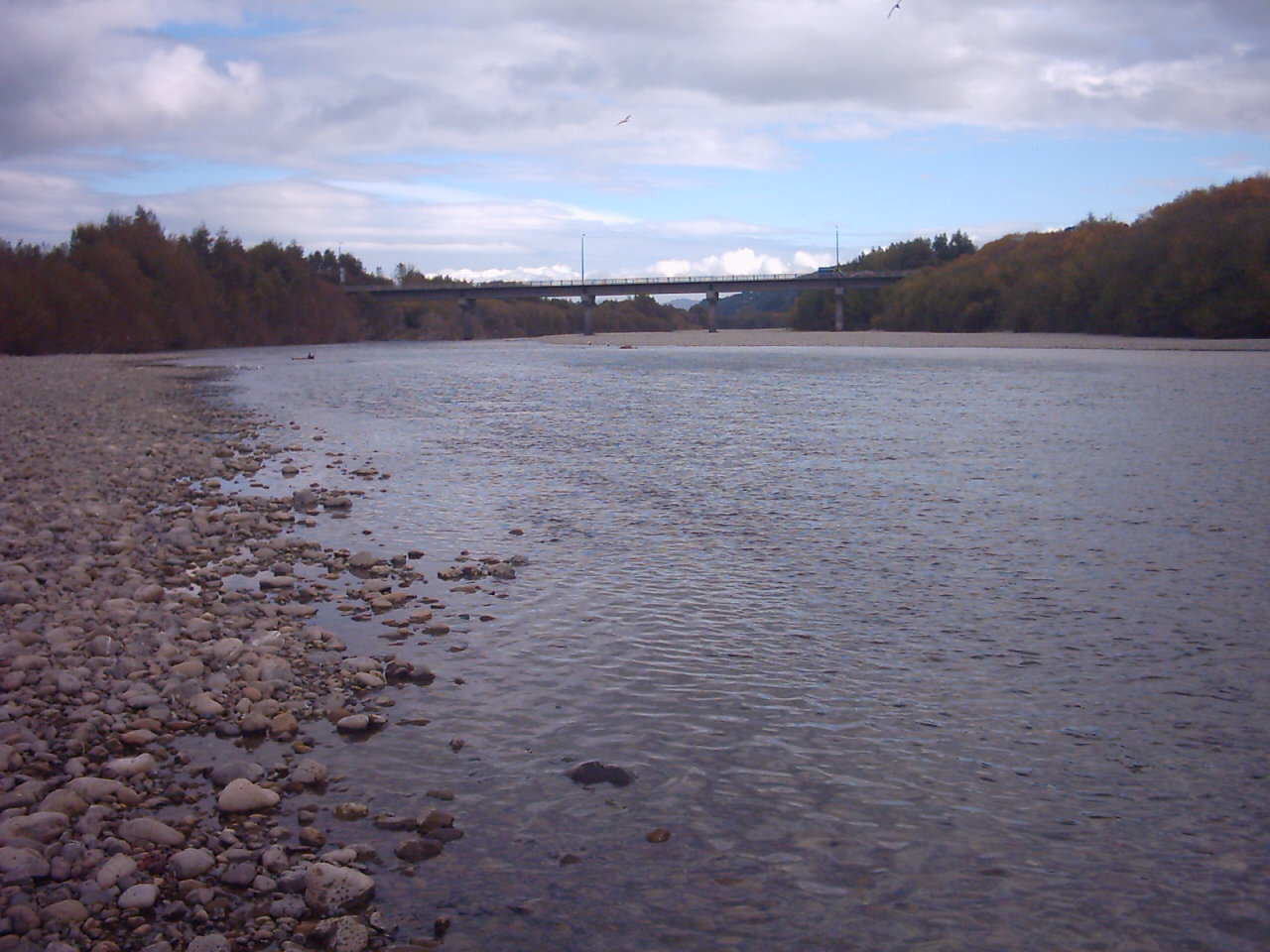
- Hutt River looking downstream
- Route of the Hutt River
- Native name: Te Awa Kairangi (Māori)

Location
- Country: New Zealand
- Island: North Island
- Region: Wellington
- District: Upper Hutt, Lower Hutt

Physical characteristics
- Source: Western Hutt River
  - location: Aston, Tararua Range
  - coordinates: 40.97206°S 175.26017°E
- 2nd source: Eastern Hutt River
  - location: Between Omega and Hells Gate, Tararua Range
  - coordinates: 40.98929°S 175.30386°E
- Mouth: Wellington Harbour
  - location: Hutt River Estuary
  - coordinates: 41°14′20″S 174°53′59″E
  - elevation: 0 m (0 ft)
- Length: 56 km (35 mi)
- Basin size: 655 km^{2} (253 sq mi)

Basin features
- Progression: Hutt River → Wellington Harbour → Cook Strait → Pacific Ocean
- Cities: Upper Hutt, Lower Hutt
- Tributaries
  - left: Pākuratahi River, Benge Creek, Mangaroa River, Mawaihakona Stream, Hull's Creek, Stokes Valley Stream, Opahu Stream, Waiwhetū Stream
  - right: Kerekere Stream, Putaputa Stream, Kororipo Stream, Akatarawa River, Clarkes Creek, Whakatīkei River, Dry Creek, Belmont Stream, Te Mome Stream
- Bridges: Kaitoke Swingbridges, Akatarawa Road Bridge, Norbert Street Footbridge, Totara Park Bridge, Moonshine Bridge, Silverstream Road Bridge, Silverstream Rail Bridge (Wairarapa Line), Whakawhirinaki Silverstream Pipe Bridge, Pomare Rail Bridge (Wairarapa Line), Kennedy-Good Bridge (Fairway Drive), Melling Bridge (Melling Link Road), New Ewen Bridge, Rail Bridge (Wairarapa Line), Waione Street Bridge

The Hutt River (Māori: Te Awa Kairangi, Te Wai o Orutu or Heretaunga; officially Te Awa Kairangi / Hutt River) flows through the southern North Island of New Zealand. It flows south-west from the southern Tararua Range for 56 kilometres (35 mi), forming a number of fertile floodplains, including Kaitoke, central Upper Hutt and Lower Hutt.

The Hutt River Trail, a regional park administered by Wellington Regional Council, runs alongside the eastern side of the river.

== Toponymy ==
Early Māori residents, such as Ngāi Tara, called the river Te Awa Kairangi. Later Māori settlers named it Te Wai o Orutu after Orutu, a Ngāti Mamoe ancestor. Ngāti Ira called it Heretaunga, after their former home in the Hawke's Bay, and this name was adopted by an Upper Hutt suburb and secondary school.

After Europeans arrived, the river was named Hutt after Sir William Hutt, chairman of the New Zealand Company. This name was given by Captain Edward Main Chaffers and Colonel William Wakefield while charting Port Nicholson in 1839. The official name since 2011 is Te Awa Kairangi / Hutt River.

== Geography ==
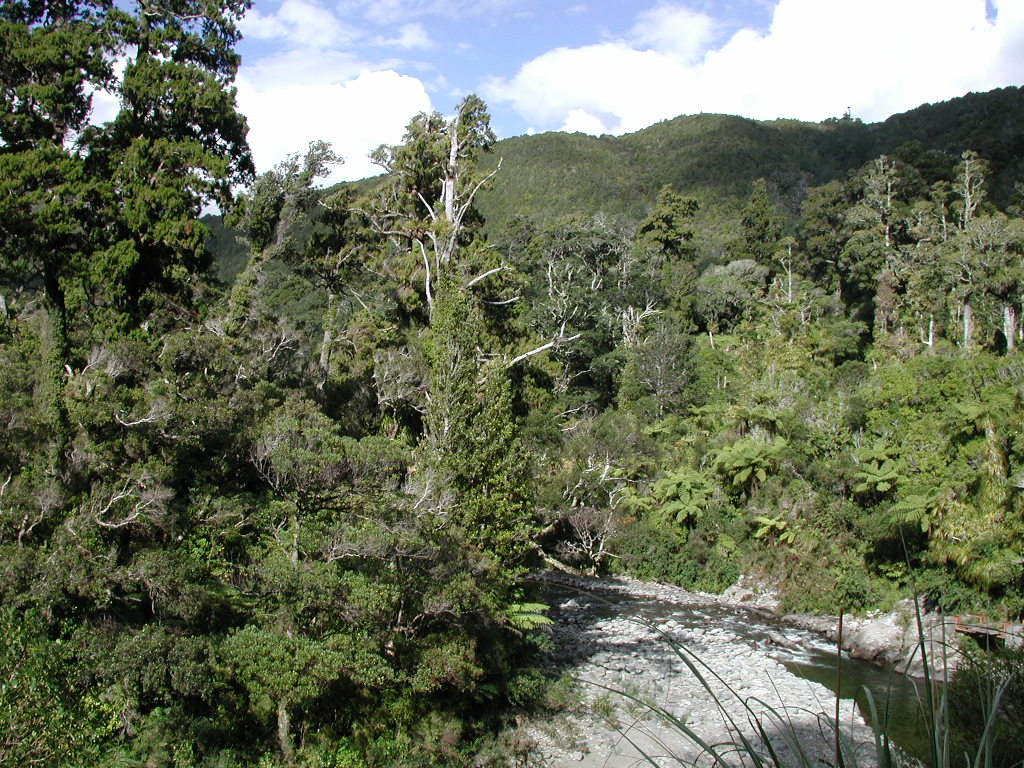
Hutt River from flume bridge, Kaitoke

For most of its length, the Hutt is a shallow and sometimes braided river in a wide rocky bed, but in the Kaitoke gorge the river flows directly over bedrock, and approaching the mouth at Petone the river is narrower and the banks steeper. The larger populated areas in Upper Hutt and Lower Hutt are protected from flooding by stopbanks and introduced willow trees, as is common in New Zealand.

The headwaters in the Kaitoke Regional Park are closed to preserve the quality of the drinking water drawn off at Kaitoke to supply the greater Wellington area. Below Kaitoke is the Kaitoke Gorge, a popular destination for rafting. Below the gorge is Te Mārua, where the Mangaroa River joins the Hutt from the east.

Further down, at Birchville, the Akatarawa River joins the Hutt from the west. Here it flows in a deep channel between the surrounding hills and is turned to flow across the Wellington Fault to Maoribank. The movement of the fault can be seen from the displacement of the river terraces in Harcourt Park.

At the top of the Upper Hutt floodplain, the river makes a sharp turn against the bedrock at the foot of the cliff at Maoribank to flow down the valley. The Upper Hutt floodplain contains the greater portion of Upper Hutt city. The Whakatiki River joins the Hutt from the west and it is about this point the river starts to flow along the virtually straight Wellington geologic fault, which lies on the western side of the river valley.

At the lower end of the Upper Hutt floodplain is Taita Gorge, which separates Upper Hutt from Lower Hutt; this gorge is significantly shorter and less constricting than Kaitoke Gorge. The river's outflow, at Petone, is into Wellington Harbour. The geological fault that the river previously followed continues as a steep bluff at the edge of the Wellington Harbour.

The Waiwhetu artesian aquifer, sometimes referred to as the Hutt Aquifer, is a pressurized zone of water-retaining sand, gravel and boulders beneath the Hutt Valley and Wellington Harbour which provides about 40% of the public fresh water supply for Lower Hutt and Wellington city. Water flows down into the aquifer from a five-kilometre stretch of the Hutt River south of Taita Gorge, at the rate of 1000 litres per second. It takes several years for water in the underground aquifer to reach Waterloo from the Taita Gorge, and about 10 years to reach the Petone foreshore. The water level in Wellington Harbour was much lower 20,000 years ago, and the ancient Hutt River used to flow down a paleochannel to the east of Matiu / Somes Island as far as the present-day Miramar Peninsula. Much of the water in the Waiwhetu Aquifer moves under the sea bed from the direction of the Hutt River to the Falcon Shoals area (between Karaka Bay and Worser Bay) at the harbour mouth via the paleochannel.

State Highway 2 follows the course of the river for most of its length, with the exception of the Kaitoke Gorge and the head waters, before crossing the Remutaka Range into the Wairarapa.

== History ==
In the early nineteenth century, the Hutt River was deeper than it is now and navigable for some distance by large canoes and boats. Māori would take produce grown in the Hutt Valley down the river by canoe and to their settlements across the harbour. Thick bush grew down to the water's edge. When early European settlers cleared the bush, the river banks began to disintegrate and collapse into the river. This led to soil being washed into the river, more flooding and changes in the river's course. Writing in 1880, James Coutts Crawford described the river as he had seen it in 1840:

The alluvial land on the banks of the Hutt was at this time covered by a dense forest, many of the trees being of gigantic size. Boats could ascend the river to the locality of the present bridge [near the current Ewen Bridge], and the sight of the foliage on the banks at this point, with the white clematis hanging in graceful folds from the lofty branches, was superb. The river being much narrower that it is now, while the valley was under forest, the flood waters would necessarily be held back, and the scour and rush of gravel and sand that has since contributed to widen it did not then prevail to nearly the same extent.

The river was also changed by a major earthquake in 1855 that raised the riverbed.

The regular flooding of Lower Hutt resulted in highly fertile land and prior to the building of state housing by the first Labour Government starting in 1937, there were many market gardens in Lower Hutt.

Well-established foot tracks along the river were formally signposted in the 1990s, through a collaboration between Wellington Regional Council, local Rotary International clubs, Hutt City Council, Upper Hutt City Council and other groups.

== Recreation ==
The Hutt River Trail, a 29 kilometre cycling and walking route, follows the entire length of the river from Petone to Kaitoke Regional Park at Upper Hutt, linking up to Kaitoke Regional Park. Most of the track is gravel, but some is sealed or grass. Some low-lying parts of the track can be affected by flooding.

There are several spots for swimming, fishing and kayaking. The trail includes some filming locations for the Lord of the Rings film franchise.

The Lower Hutt Parkrun runs along the last 2.5-kilometre (1.6 mi) section of the Hutt River from just north of the Ewen Bridge down to the Waione Street Bridge and back.

== Ecology ==
The river has a good stock of brown trout.

== Bridges ==
Heading downstream:

- Kaitoke Swingbridges, two footbridges in Kaitoke Regional Park.
- Te Mārua Bridgem a demolished bridge.
- Akatarawa Road Bridge, a two-lane road bridge opened in 1981 to replace a single-lane road bridge opened in 1915 and demolished in 1982. Abutments of the old bridge remain in the adjacent downstream riverbank and a pier footing remains in the river bed.
- Akatarawa Bridge, the old Hutt County Council wooden truss bridge that crossed the river near the intersection of Rata Street and Birch Terrace with Akatarawa Road. The bridge was constructed in 1880-81 and closed in 1953. Piers were damaged by flooding and then demolished and removed from riverbed in 1998.
- Hutt Borough Council Pipe Bridge was constructed adjacent to the Akatarawa Bridge in 1913 to carry the Hutt Borough Council water supply pipes until decommissioned in 1958. It was damaged by flooding, and demolished in 1998 at the same time as the Akatarawa Bridge.
- Norbert Street Footbridge between California Park in Totara Park and Harcourt Park at the end of Norbert Street in Birchville.
- Maoribank Suspension Bridge was built in 1917, crossing at the bend in the river at the foot of Maoribank Cliff. The bridge was demolished in 1998, after the cliffside pier was damaged by flooding, making the bridge unsafe.
- Totara Park Bridge (Totara Park Road), a two-lane road bridge, opened about 1970 and provides access to the suburb of Totara Park.
- Moonshine Bridge (River Road/SH 2), a curved two-lane road bridge, was opened in 1987 as part of the River Road bypass of Upper Hutt. It replaced a road bridge slightly upstream of the current bridge.
- Silverstream Road Bridge (Fergusson Drive), a two-lane road bridge, carries a bulk water supply pipe, underslung on the north side, connecting Te Mārua water treatment plant with Porirua and Wellington City.
- Silverstream Rail Bridge (Wairarapa Line), a double-track rail bridge, opened in 1954 to replace the 1875 single-track rail bridge around 500 metres further downstream.
- Whakawhirinaki Silverstream Pipe Bridge, a pipe bridge containing a shared path for pedestrians and cyclists, opened in 2025 to connect the Te Mārua water treatment plant with Stokes Valley, Upper Hutt, Porirua and Wellington City.
- Pomare Rail Bridge (Wairarapa Line), a double-track rail bridge, opened in 1954 as part of the Hutt Valley railway deviation.
- Kennedy-Good Bridge (Fairway Drive), a two-lane road bridge, opened in 1979 and was the first bridge at this site. The bridge is named after the Mayor of Lower Hutt at the time, John Kennedy-Good.
- Melling Bridge (Melling Link Road), a three-lane bridge opened 1957, with one eastbound lane and two westbound lanes. This is the second bridge at this site, the first being a one-lane suspension bridge opened in 1909, approximately 200 metres upstream.
- New Ewen Bridge is a single span arch bridge carrying four traffic lanes of traffic and footways. It is the seventh bridge at this site and was opened in 1996. The preceding bridges, which crossed nearer to Bridge Street, upstream of the latest bridge, were opened in 1844, 1847, 1856, 1872, 1904 and 1929.
- The Rail Bridge (Wairarapa Line) is a two-track rail bridge with pedestrian walkway. It was opened in 1927 with the then Hutt Valley Line to Waterloo.
- Waione Street Bridge (Hutt Estuary Bridge) is a two-lane road bridge opened in 1954, that carries a bulk water supply pipe connecting Waterloo and Wainuiomata water treatment plants with Wellington City.
