= Akatarawa River =

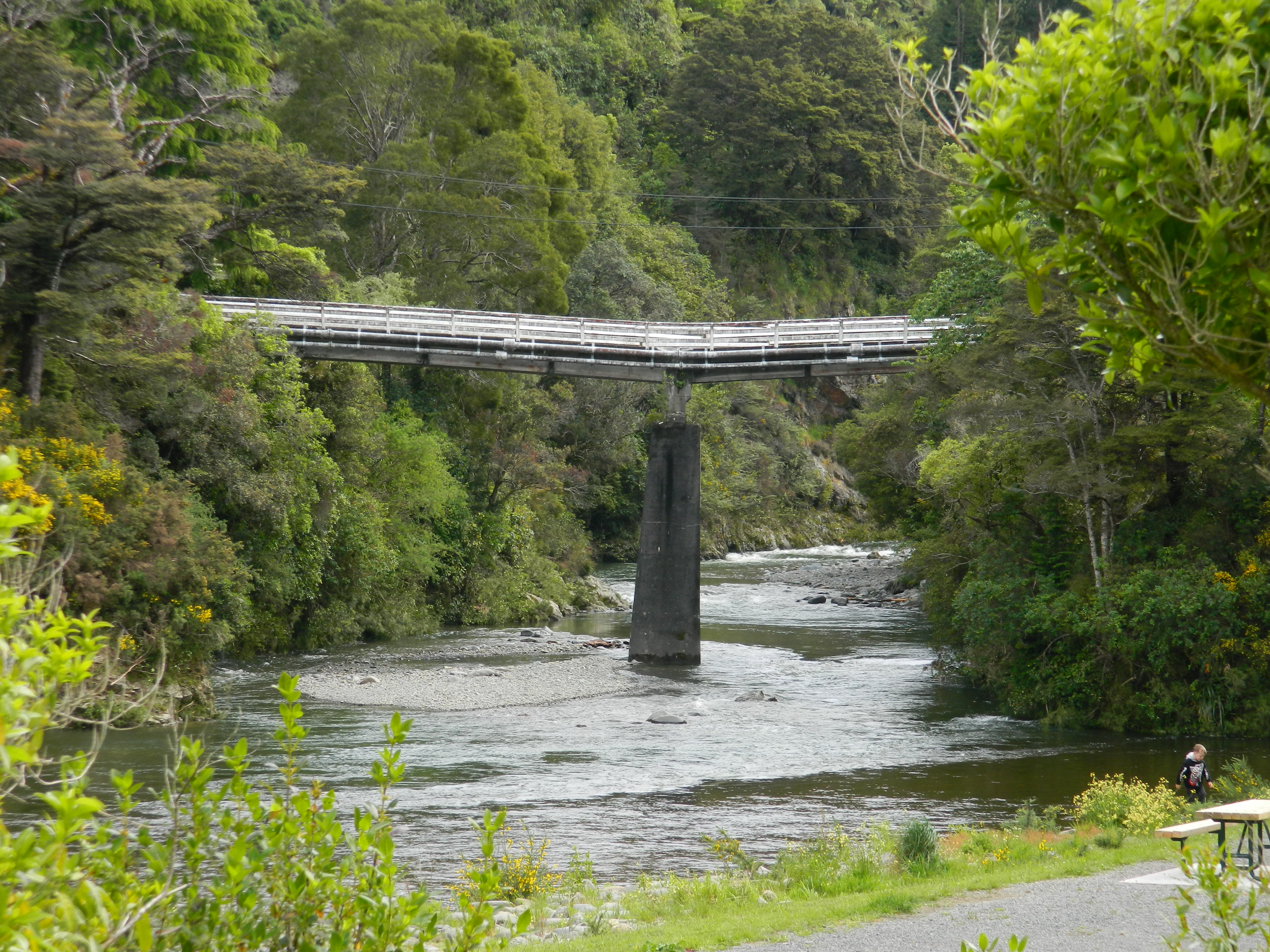
- The former Andrews Bridge at Birchville, Upper Hutt
- Route of the Akatarawa River
- Mouth of the Akatarawa River Akatarawa River (North Island)
- Etymology: From Māori: aka (vine) and tarewa (hanging or drooping)
- Native name: Akatarewa (Māori)

Location
- Country: New Zealand
- Island: North Island
- Region: Wellington
- District: Kāpiti Coast, Upper Hutt

Physical characteristics
- Source: Maunganui
  - coordinates: 40.96843°S 175.05701°E
  - elevation: 600 m (2,000 ft)
- Mouth: Te Awa Kairangi / Hutt River
  - location: Birchville
  - coordinates: 41°05′25″S 175°05′52″E
  - elevation: 80 m (260 ft)
- Length: 20 km (12 mi)
- Basin size: 116 km^{2} (45 sq mi)

Basin features
- Progression: Akatarawa River → Te Awa Kairangi / Hutt River → Wellington Harbour → Cook Strait → Pacific Ocean
- Cities: Cloustonville, Karapoti, Birchville (Upper Hutt)
- Tributaries
  - left: Bull Stream, Chilly Stream, Frances Stream
  - right: Deadwood Stream, Akatarawa River West
- Bridges: Bridge near 2415 Akatarawa Road, bridge near 2021 Akatarawa Road, Karapoti Road Bridge, Birchville Bridge

The Akatarawa River is a short river in the lower North Island of New Zealand. A tributary of Te Awa Kairangi / Hutt River, it flows south through the Akatarawa Valley, reaching Te Awa Kairangi / Hutt River at the Upper Hutt suburb of Birchville.

== Etymology ==
The name is a misspelling of the Māori language name Akatarewa, meaning hanging vines.

== Geography ==
The Akatarawa River flows south for approximately 20 km (12 mi) through small rocky gorges of the southern Tararua Range and the Akatarawa Valley before joining the Te Awa Kairangi / Hutt River at Birchville, a suburb in the northern end of Upper Hutt. Its waters ultimately reach Wellington Harbour, and then flow out into Cook Strait. The river valley was formed by the Akatarawa Fault, while the Akatarawa River West was formed by the Moonshine Fault. Much of the river's catchment area is native forest, with a smaller section of managed pine forestry. Very minimal urban development has occurred in the river catchment.

Primarily in Upper Hutt City, a section of the upper river is located in the Kāpiti Coast District.

== History ==
The river valley was the site of a traditional ara, where Māori travelled overland between the Kāpiti Coast and Hutt Valley. The forested valley is a traditional mahinga kai, where birds and fish were hunted alongside forest materials and foods. The mana whenua of the area include Ngāti Toa and Taranaki iwi who settled in the Wellington area, including Te Āti Awa.

In the 19th century, a railway line was proposed to connect the Kāpiti Coast and Hutt Valley. Plans for the line were abandoned in the 1870s due to the construction of the Wellington–Manawatu line via Johnsonville and Porirua.

The Akatarawa River catchment was sparsely populated in the latter 19th century, but became the site of a logging industry, operating between the 1880s and first half of the 20th century. Price's Bush Tramway was developed in the river valley as a part of this industry.

Plans for the river to be dammed for residential water supply were developed in the 1920s and 1930s, however these plans were not completed.

A concrete bridge was constructed across the lower river at Birchville, known as Andrews Bridge, or the Birchville Bridge. In October 2015, the bridge was structurally damaged during floods, isolating 62 residences across the river. A new single lane bridge was constructed opened 19 months later, on 3 May 2017.

== Biodiversity ==
Fish species known to occur in the river include the giant kōkopu, redfin bully, bluegill bully, Cran's bully, New Zealand longfin eel and the short-finned eel.

== Recreation ==
The Akatarawa River is a location for recreational brown trout fishing, especially near Cloustonville and Karepoti. The lower sections are also popular for swimming.

The Akatarawa Forest regional park is located in the river's catchment. Staglands Wildlife Reserve is located beside the river, as well as the Wellesley Country Park events centre.

== Gallery ==
Children enjoying swimming at the Akatarawa River, 1978

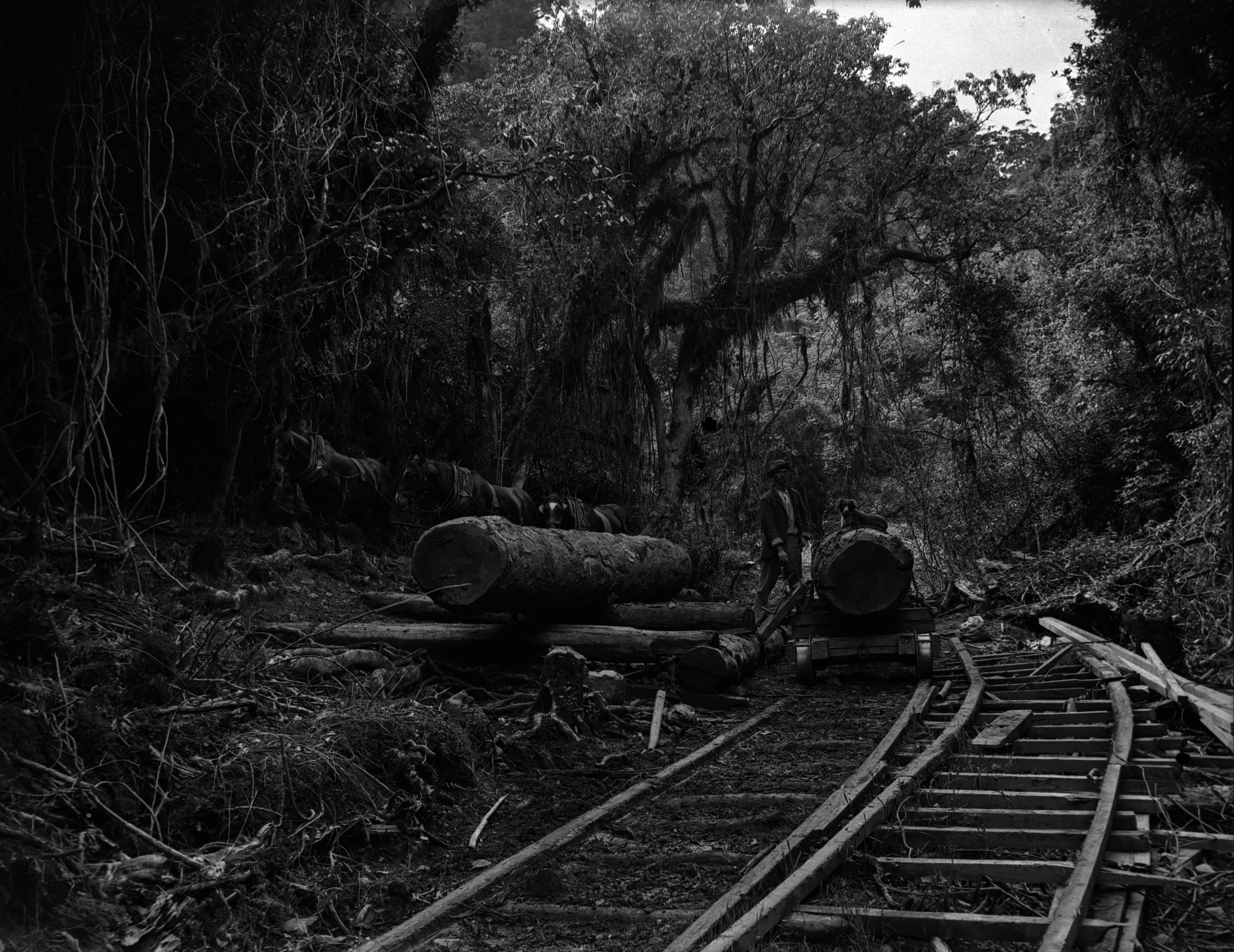
Logging in the Akatarawa Valley, c. 1912-1916

Wetland at Staglands Wildlife Reserve

== See also ==
- List of rivers of Wellington Region
- List of rivers of New Zealand
