= Birchville =

- Suburb
- Interactive map of Birchville
- Coordinates: 41.09134°S 175.09834°E
- Country: New Zealand
- Island: North Island
- City: Upper Hutt
- Established: late 1800s
- Electorates: Remutaka; Ikaroa-Rāwhiti (Māori)

Government
  - Territorial Authority: Upper Hutt City Council
  - Regional council: Greater Wellington Regional Council
  - Mayor of Upper Hutt: Peri Zee
  - Remutaka MP: Chris Hipkins
  - Ikaroa-Rāwhiti MP: Cushla Tangaere-Manuel

Area
  - Total: 8.26 km^{2} (3.19 sq mi)

Population (2023 Census)
  - Total: 2,745
  - Density: 332/km^{2} (861/sq mi)

Birchville is a suburb of Upper Hutt, New Zealand in the North Island. Its centre lies at the entrance to the Akatarawa Valley, in the north of the city, near confluence of the Akatarawa River with the Hutt River. It is about a 5 km (10-minute) drive north from the centre of Upper Hutt. The Birchville community is spread out along both banks of the Hutt River in a long fairly narrow valley.

== History ==
=== European settlement ===
Originally described as being part of Akatarawa or Mungaroa in early news paper reports. The "Town of Birchville" name only appears in land registry records during the mid-1920s, when the Commissioner of Crown Lands offered week-end cottage sections on the banks of the Hutt River for sale or lease. Other land owners also subdivided their land on the opposite river bank, when the sections in the original subdivision all sold and many were built on. These subdividers noted that Birchville was a popular week-end holiday resort.

When the Parkdale subdivision was developed during the 1970s, confusion arose over what was the appropriate name for the suburb should be. In 1982, the New Zealand Geographic Board clarified that Birchville, rather than Parkdale, Rivervale, Akatarawa, or Gillespies Road was the official locality name. The Upper Hutt City Council again affirmed, during the first decade of the 21st century, that the suburb of Birchville included all the housing developments along Akatarawa Road and Gemstone Drive between State Highway 2 and the Akatarawa Cemetery.

Europeans first explored this area in 1840. On 4th (or 5th) August that year, a party of 5, led by Ernst Diffenbach, using a punt to travel up-river, had reached the Akatarawa River junction. The party appears to have stopped on the riverbank to brew tea before continuing up the Akatarawa River.

The locality was first settled in the late 19th century. In the mid-1860s the Wellington Provincial Government proposed building a road and/or railway line between what was then called Mungaroa in the Upper Hutt Valley and Waikanae, to overcome the difficult route of the Paekakariki Hill Road. Lands in the Akatarawa Valley were put up for sale and a line of road had been surveyed by 1878. Over the next couple of years work proceeded in driving the road up the Akatarawa Valley.

== Bridges ==
In 1880, the Hutt County Council accepted tenders to build two wooden bridges across the Hutt and Akatarawa Rivers and subsequently cut a bridle track to Waikanae. A water-colour by Christopher Aubrey of the Akatarawa Valley painted in 1890 shows these "black bridges" and the Akatarawa Road as it then was.

During the 1890s the Black Bridge Mill was established between the two bridges. The mill was served by a bush tramway.

During 1914 the Upper Hutt Borough Council purchased an area of land to supply water for Upper Hutt. Then, in the early 1930s, the Birchville Dam was built for the Upper Hutt Borough Council.

About 1915, Hutt County Council proposed building a concrete bridge across the Hutt River just north of the Akatarawa Stream because the wooden bridges could no longer carry the traffic loads.

In December 1939, flooding of the Hutt River washed away one mid-channel pier of the concrete bridge as well as causing damage to the deck of the Black Bridge near the Akatarawa Store. While the pier on the concrete bridge was replaced, the wooden bridges were redecked and pressed into service to provide an alternative route for Akatarawa Road traffic.

However, over the next few years the state of these wooden bridges deteriorated so much that they eventually had to be closed to vehicle traffic for safety reasons. While they were officially restricted to pedestrian traffic, some motorists still attempted to use the bridges. While the Hutt County Council decided to replace the bridge over the Akatarawa River, it chose not to repair the main wooden bridge over the Hutt River and instead chose close the bridge in November 1953 and subsequently removed the deck, leaving only the substructure that carried the Upper Hutt water supply and other services. In October 1998 another flood so damaged the remaining piers and structure of this 1880s vintage bridge that it needed to be demolished. There is now little physical evidence to show where this bridge crossed the Hutt River other than power lines that align with a paper road shown on some maps.

=== Andrews Bridge ===
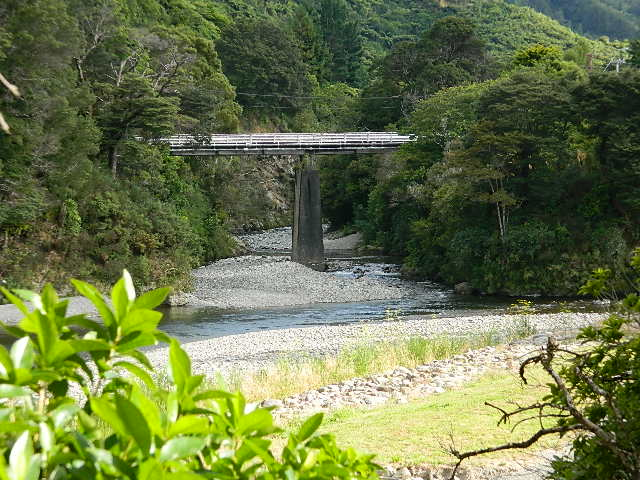
Andrews Bridge (2014)

In March 1953 the Hutt County Council sought ratepayer approval to raise a loan for a replacement bridge across the Akatarawa River to service Bridge Road. In July 1953 proposals for the replacement bridge, to be named "Andrews Bridge" after a recently deceased councillor, were presented to a public meeting and plans drawn up. A contract to build the bridge was let in February 1954 and the replacement bridge opened on 11 December 1954.

The replacement bridge across the Akatarawa River had two pre-stressed concrete deck spans supported on the single concrete pier of the original wooden bridge in the middle of the stream. This bridge has a name plate calling it Andrews Bridge.

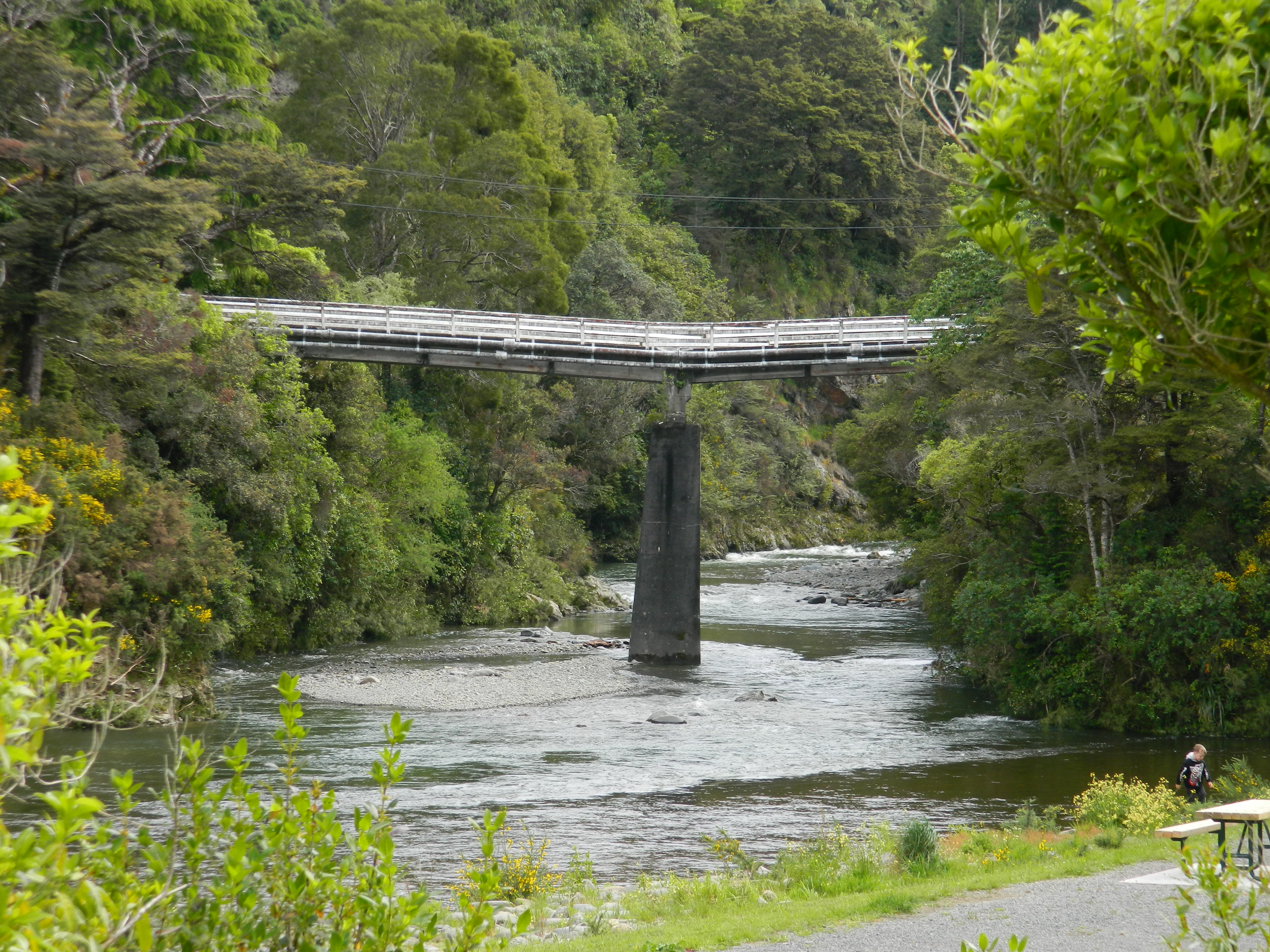
Andrews Bridge on 31 Oct 2015 (post failure)

On 29 October 2015, the centre pier of Andrews Bridge suffered a failure during a flood. This resulted in the pier footing moving in the river bed and slumping down. The deck spans dropped 1 to 2 metres at the centre, leaving them precariously balanced on the centre pier.

As at 31 October 2015 the Upper Hutt City Council had not determined the cause of the failure, but it indicated that the bridge would most likely need to be replaced and this would probably take several months to a year to happen. To provide emergency access to residents, the council announced that it had asked a road contractor to build an access road from Tōtara Park along the route of the Hutt River Trail on the western side of the Hutt River.

=== Akatarawa Road Bridge (1980) ===
Around 1980, a two lane concrete bridge was built immediately upstream of the Akatarawa Road concrete bridge built in 1917 and because that bridge was no longer safe to use it was demolished. The remains of this first concrete bridge's piers and abutments can still be seen in the riverbed and on the river banks today.

== Flood Protection ==
Stop Banks were also constructed north of the new bridge to prevent flooding of the Parkdale subdivision that was being developed in the late 1970s and early 1980s.

== Recreation ==
The Hutt River Trail now provides formal walking paths for tourist and residents along both banks of the river from Totara Park to the Akatarawa Stream. In places, the remains of the old waterworks can be seen beside the trail in some places. Also, the Cannon Point Walkway track, which passes the Birchville Dam, can be accessed from the river trail at the end of Bridge Road. North-east of the Akatarawa Road bridge, the river trail extends on both banks but there is no crossing available upstream.

At Twin Bridges Park, near the Akatarawa Road Bridge and Andrews Bridge, is the Birchville Picnic Area, which has a Tea Shelter and several picnic tables. Beneath the bridges are two popular swimming holes.

== Demographics ==
Birchville covers 8.26 km^{2} (3.19 sq mi). It is part of the Birchville-Brown Owl statistical area, which covers 8.99 km^{2} (3.47 sq mi).

Historical population for Birchville
Year	Pop.	±% p.a.
2006	2,454	—
2013	2,430	−0.14%
2018	2,550	+0.97%
2023	2,745	+1.48%

Birchville had a population of 2,745 in the 2023 New Zealand census, an increase of 195 people (7.6%) since the 2018 census, and an increase of 315 people (13.0%) since the 2013 census. There were 1,383 males, 1,356 females, and 6 people of other genders in 1,005 dwellings. 3.7% of people identified as LGBTIQ+. There were 570 people (20.8%) aged under 15 years, 510 (18.6%) aged 15 to 29, 1,329 (48.4%) aged 30 to 64, and 360 (13.1%) aged 65 or older.

People could identify as more than one ethnicity. The results were 85.1% European (Pākehā); 17.6% Māori; 5.2% Pasifika; 6.3% Asian; 1.0% Middle Eastern, Latin American and African New Zealanders (MELAA); and 1.4% other, which includes people giving their ethnicity as "New Zealander". English was spoken by 97.2%, Māori by 3.1%, Samoan by 1.1%, and other languages by 7.7%. No language could be spoken by 2.1% (e.g. too young to talk). New Zealand Sign Language was known by 0.5%. The percentage of people born overseas was 19.1, compared with 28.8% nationally.

Religious affiliations were 25.8% Christian, 1.1% Hindu, 0.2% Islam, 0.9% Māori religious beliefs, 0.5% Buddhist, 0.5% New Age, 0.3% Jewish, and 2.1% other religions. People who answered that they had no religion were 63.0%, and 6.0% of people did not answer the census question.

Of those at least 15 years old, 441 (20.3%) people had a bachelor's or higher degree, 1,284 (59.0%) had a post-high school certificate or diploma, and 477 (21.9%) people exclusively held high school qualifications. 330 people (15.2%) earned over $100,000 compared to 12.1% nationally. The employment status of those at least 15 was 1,293 (59.4%) full-time, 279 (12.8%) part-time, and 72 (3.3%) unemployed.

== Education ==
Birchville School is a co-educational state primary school for Year 1 to 6 students, with a roll of 131 as of July 2026. It opened in 1978.
