= Birchville Dam =

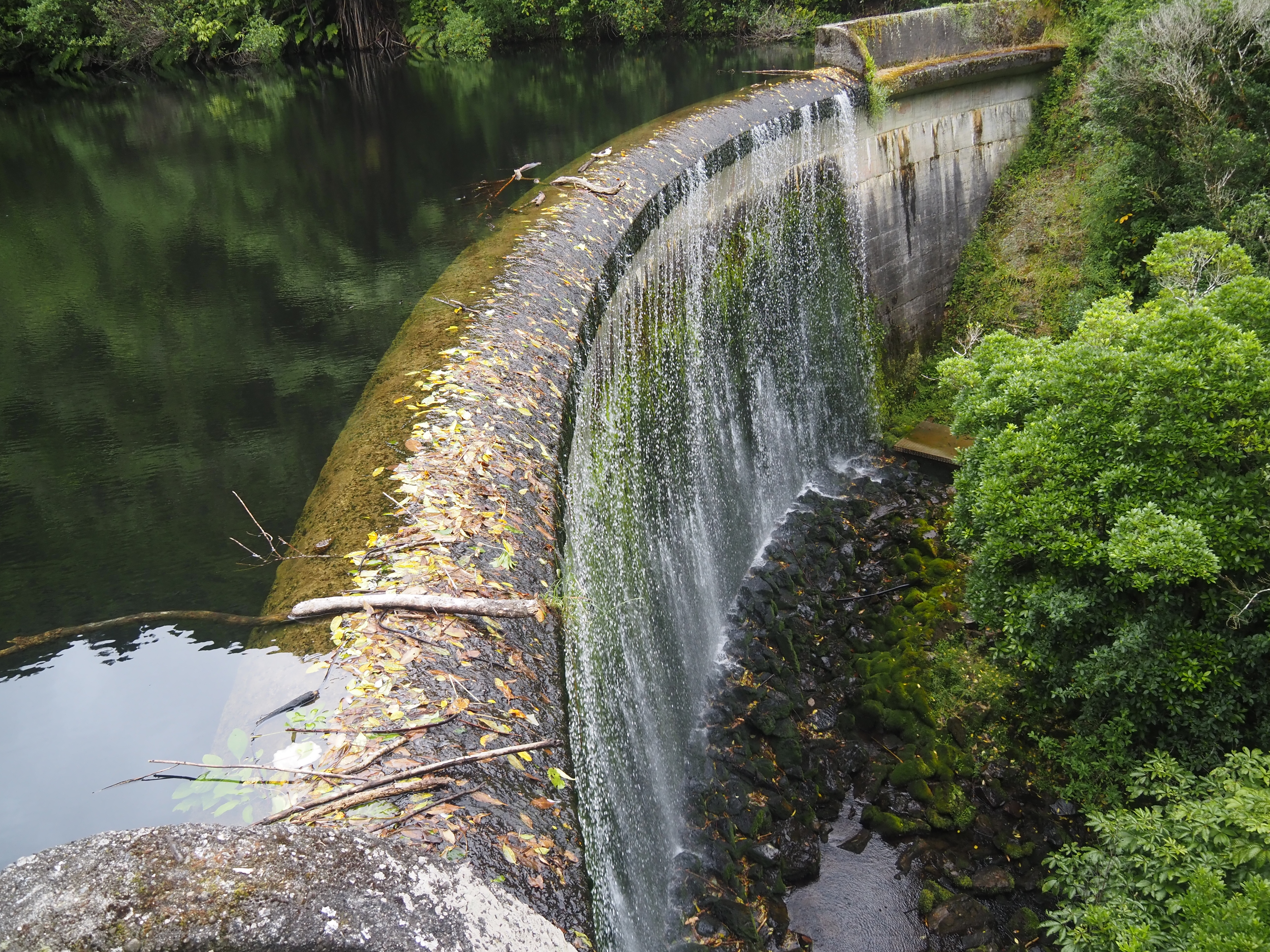
- Interactive map of Birchville Dam
- Country: New Zealand
- Location: Upper Hutt, Wellington region
- Coordinates: 41°05′21″S 175°05′13″E
- Purpose: Water supply
- Status: Decommissioned
- Construction began: 1930

Dam and spillways
- Type of dam: Concrete
- Impounds: Clarke's Creek

Birchville Dam is believed to be the second unreinforced concrete arch dam built for water supply in New Zealand. It was built in 1930 for the Upper Hutt Borough Council to provide increased water capacity for the borough and replaced a water supply weir built in 1913–1914 at the same location on Clarke's Creek, near Birchville. Decommissioned in 1958, when Upper Hutt joined the Wellington regional water scheme, this dam is now an historic attraction on the Cannon Point Walkway.

This dam does not appear in the New Zealand Dam Inventory (1994).

== History ==
At the beginning of the 20th century the Wellington Acclimatization Society had a trout-rearing pond on the northern bank of the Hutt River near where Clarke's Creek entered the Hutt River, just downstream of the first Akatarawa Road bridge. The water for this pond was taken from Clarke's Creek. In 1912, civil engineer G. Laing-Meason proposed a water supply scheme to the Upper Hutt Town Board that involved constructing a weir further up Clarke's Creek and piping the water to Upper Hutt and as far as Silverstream. Construction commenced in 1913 and was completed by February 1914. The Minister of Public Works officially opened the water supply scheme on 28 February 1914. Although G. Laing-Meason had initially proposed an option using 10 inch pipes and a 100,000 gallon reservoir, to allow for extending the water supply as far as the Silverstream Bridge. The constructed scheme only used 8 inch pipes and a 50,000 gallon reservoir. By the mid-1920s, Upper Hutt residents were complaining that there was inadequate water pressure and the now Upper Hutt Borough Council began refusing to supply water to Hutt County residents just outside the borough boundaries in Heretaunga and Pinehaven.

In early 1930, the Upper Hutt Borough Council instructed consulting engineer H. F. Toogood to call tenders for a concrete arch dam 50-foot height and 90-foot radius to be constructed at the water supply headworks. Tenders closed on Monday 7 April 1930. On 12 April, M. G. Templeton was awarded the contract for 5800 pounds, although an extension of time was recommended on 10 November 1930 and an additional 580 pounds (10%) loan was needed on 2 February 1931. The engineer advised that the maintenance period expired on 16 March 1931.

The constructed dam is 15 metres high from base of the foundations to the crest but infill boulders on the downstream face, to prevent scouring make the dam appear lower. The dam is 2.33 metres thick at the base and has a 1.25-metre wide parapet. The arch is 46 metres long and has a 27.5-metre constant radius, with a crest length of 40 metres.

The dam remained in service until 1958, when Upper Hutt commenced taking water from the Kaitoke regional water scheme.

In 1988 the Birchville Dam reservoir was drained and found to have silted up to 6.3 metres below the spillway.

== Sources cited ==
- Offer, R.E. (Robert) (1997). Walls for Water: Pioneer Dam Building in New Zealand. Palmerston North: The Dunmore Press Ltd. pp. 10, 22, 26. ISBN 0-86469-313-3.
- Meachen, Laurie J. (1995). Bon-Bons from Birchville (Being mostly adventures into the timeless tapestries of history). pp. 84–88.
- Benson, Chris (c. 1997), The History Surrounding Upper Hutt's Birchville Weir and then Dam, Upper Hutt: Upper Hutt Community Archive hosted by Upper Hutt City Library
