= UHCC =

UHCC may refer to:

- University of Houston Coastal Center, in La Marque, Texas, United States
- Upper Hutt City Council, a city council in New Zealand
