= Rex Kirton =

New Zealand politician (1942–2024)

Rex Kirton QSO JP

10th Mayor of Upper Hutt
- In office 1977–2001
- Preceded by: Doris Nicholson
- Succeeded by: Wayne Guppy

Wellington Regional Councillor
- In office 2001–2010

Personal details
- Born: Rex Stratton Kirton; 3 June 1942
- Died: 4 June 2024 (aged 82) Upper Hutt, New Zealand
- Relations: Earle Kirton (brother)

Rex Stratton Kirton QSO JP (3 June 1942 – 4 June 2024) was a New Zealand local-body politician in the Wellington Region. He was mayor of Upper Hutt for 24 years until 2001, and then served three terms on the Greater Wellington Regional Council.

== Biography ==
Kirton was born on 3 June 1942. He was educated at St Joseph's School, Upper Hutt, and St Patrick's College, Silverstream from 1955 to 1959, where he was captain of the 1st XV rugby team and tennis champion. He later studied at Victoria University of Wellington and the University of Otago, and worked in England as an accountant.

His father, Bill, had worked in banking, then moved to Upper Hutt where he ran a general store in the 1940s, later buying farmland in Whitemans Valley where Rex, while mayor, lived and farmed.

Kirton served as vice-president of Wellington Cricket and president of the Wellington Rugby Union.

Kirton died in Upper Hutt on 4 June 2024.

== Local government ==
Kirton was first elected mayor of Upper Hutt in 1977. When he retired from this role in 2001, he was the longest-serving mayor in New Zealand at that time. In 2001, Kirton stood as the Upper Hutt representative on the Wellington Regional Council. He served three terms until 2010 when he was beaten by Paul Swain. In 2007, he had been returned unopposed. He was chairman of the regional council's parks, forests and utilities committee.

In 1990, Kirton received the New Zealand 1990 Commemoration Medal. In the 1997 New Year Honours, he was appointed a Companion of the Queen's Service Order, for public services. Kirton Drive, the main street in the suburb of Riverstone Terraces, is named after him.

Political offices
Preceded by Doris Nicholson	Mayor of Upper Hutt; 1977–2001	Succeeded by Wayne Guppy
