= Akatarawa Saddle =

Mountain pass in New Zealand

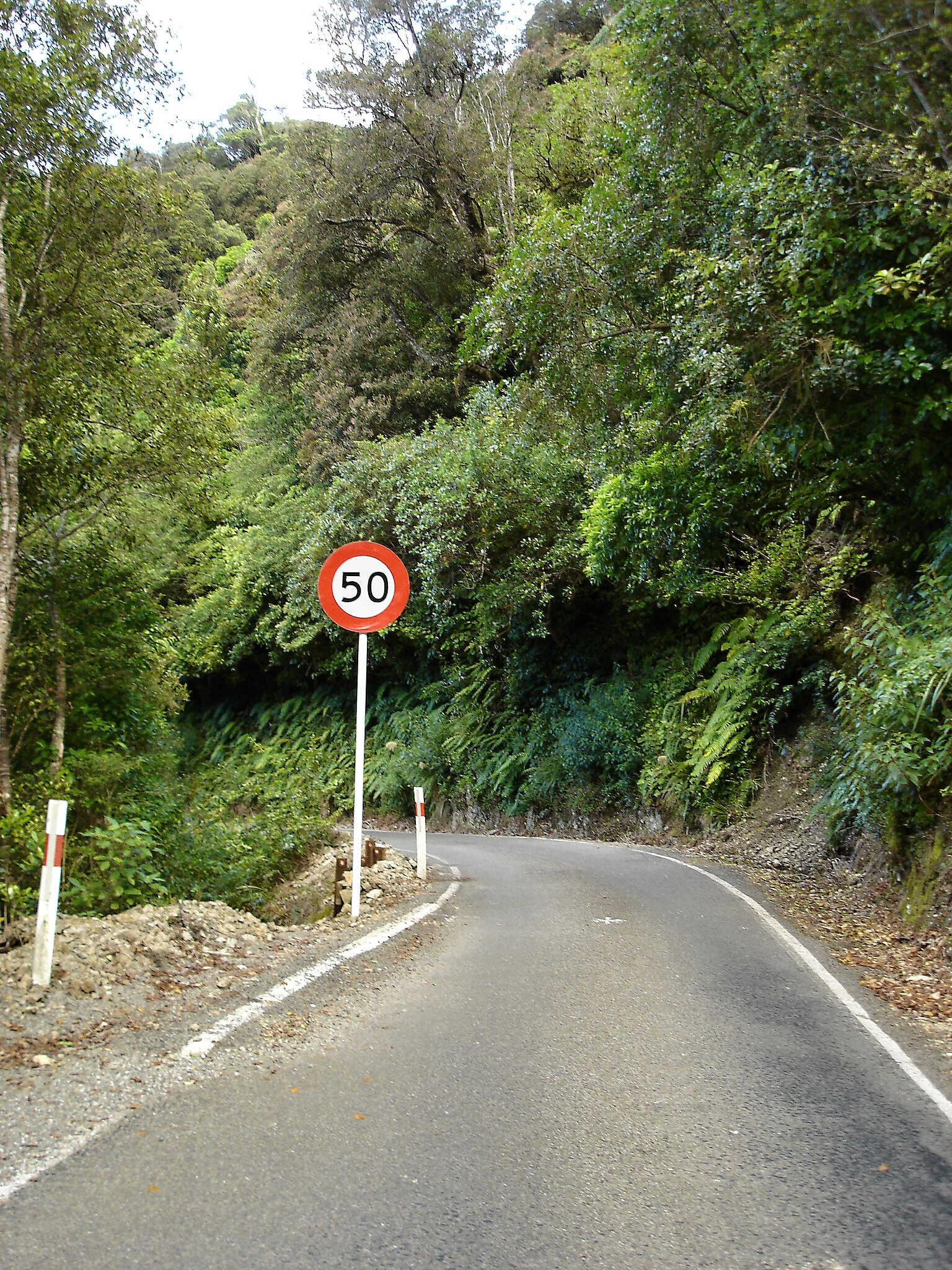
- Akatarawa Road in 2005

- Location within New Zealand
- Elevation: 450 metres (1,480 ft)
- Traversed by: Akatarawa Road

Third Approach
- Location: Wellington, North Island, New Zealand
- Range: Tararua Range
- Coordinates: 40°56′54″S 175°6′30″E

Akatarawa Saddle is a 450 m above sea level mountain pass in the Wellington Region on the North Island of New Zealand. It is traversed by the Akatarawa Road which passes the southern part of the Tararua Range from Upper Hutt southeast to Waikanae northwest. The Akatarawa River flows south into the Hutt River ending in the Cook Strait while waters north of the saddle lead to the Tasman Sea.

About 1911 surveys were made in the hope of finding a railway route between Upper Hutt and Waikanae, but a lengthy tunnel would have been needed, though the route was claimed to be about 5 mi (8.0 km) shorter than the North Island Main Trunk. Shortages of concrete delayed completion of the road, though it was drivable in 1922 and bridges were completed in 1923.

== See also ==
- Akatarawa Valley
