= 2025 Upper Hutt City Council election =

Elections in New Zealand

- 11 October 2025
- Turnout: 16,728 (50.54% ▲6.59 pp)
- Mayor
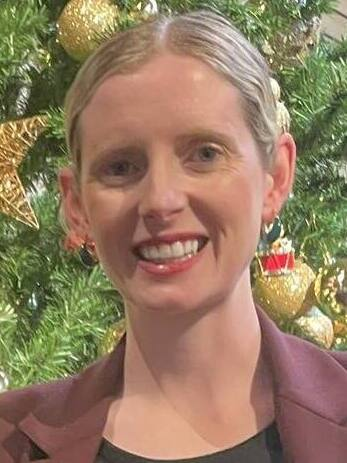

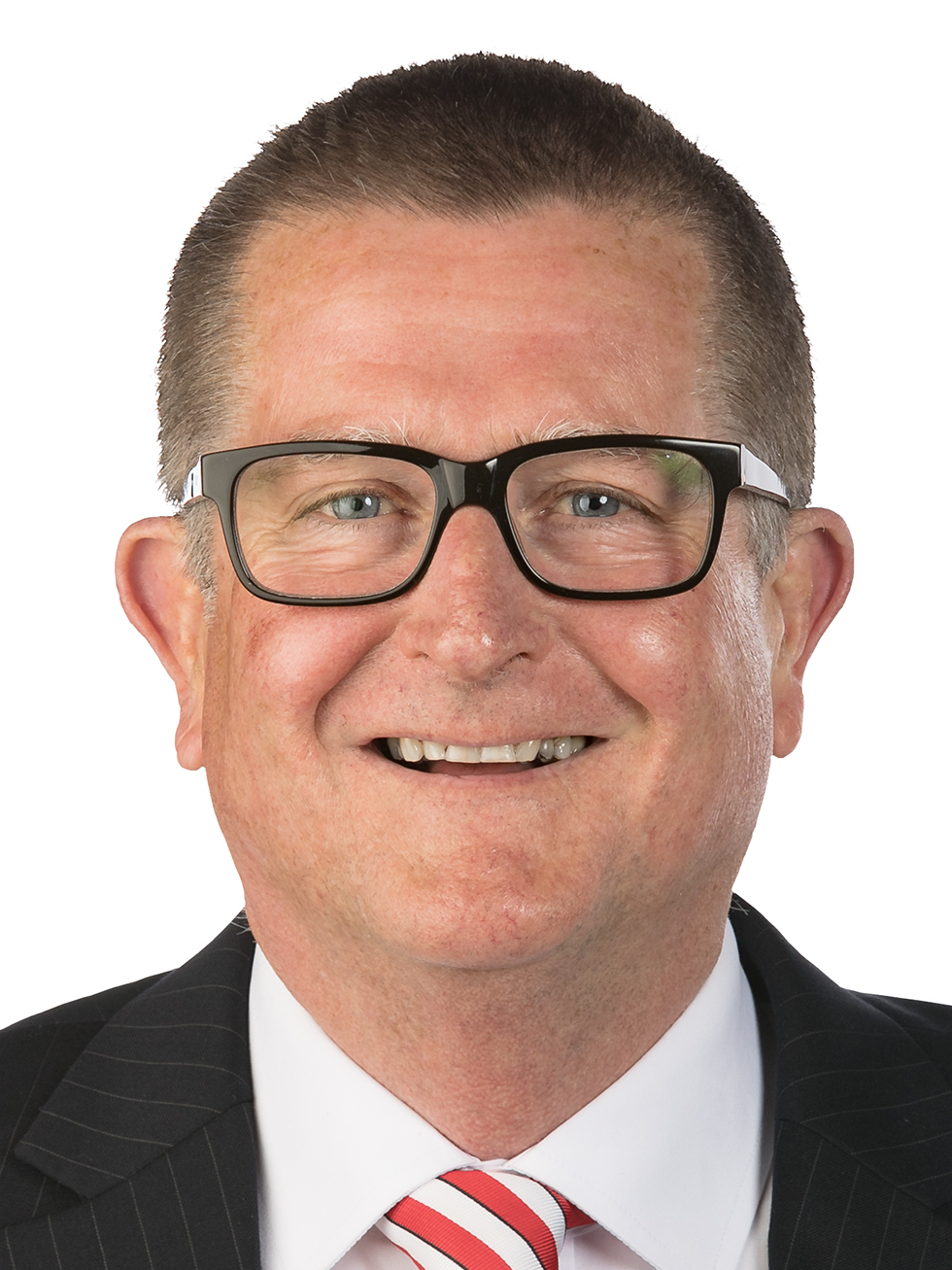

Candidate	Peri Zee	Wayne Guppy	Angela McLeod
Party	Independent	Independent	Independent
Popular vote	5,479	3,931	1,941
Percentage	32.75%	23.50%	11.60%
	Ind	Ind	Ind
Candidate	Blair Griffiths	Emma Holderness	Hellen Swales
Party	Independent	Independent	Independent
Popular vote	1,892	1,892	1,511
Percentage	11.31%	11.02%	9.03%
Mayor before election
Wayne Guppy
Independent
Elected mayor
Peri Zee
Independent
- Councillors
- 10 seats on the governing body of Upper Hutt City Council; 6 seats needed for a majority
Party	Seats	+/–
Independent	10	0
This lists parties that won seats. See the complete results below.
Control before	Control after
No majority	No majority

The 2025 Upper Hutt City Council election was a local election to be held from 9 September to 11 October in Upper Hutt, New Zealand, as part of that year's territorial authority elections and other local elections held nation-wide.

Voters elected the mayor of Upper Hutt, 10 city councillors, and other local representatives for the 2025–2028 term of the Upper Hutt City Council. Postal voting and the first-past-the-post voting system were used.

Urban planner and transport advisor Peri Zee won the mayoralty. Zee defeated the incumbent of 24 years Wayne Guppy, who had been seeking a ninth term as mayor.

== Key dates ==
- 4 July 2025: Nominations for candidates opened
- 1 August 2025: Nominations for candidates closed at 12 pm
- 9 September 2025: Voting documents were posted and voting opened
- 11 October 2025: Voting closed at 12 pm and progress/preliminary results published
- 16–19 October 2025: Final results declared.

== Background ==
=== Positions up for election ===
Voters in the city elected the mayor of Upper Hutt, 10 city councillors, and members of the Rimutaka Licensing Trust. They also elected several members of the Greater Wellington Regional Council. (Note: 1 member representing the city.; 1 member partially from the city in the Te Upoko o te Ika a Māui Māori constituency.)

=== Māori ward ===
In November 2023, the Upper Hutt City Council had voted by six to five to introduce a Māori ward for the 2025 and 2028 elections. However, following a change in legislation regarding Māori wards, the council voted in August 2024 to rescind this decision. It thus avoided a requirement to hold a referendum on retaining the ward alongside this election.

== List of candidates ==
=== Incumbents not seeking re-election ===
- Dylan Bentley, councillor since 2019
- Chris Carson, incumbent councillor
- Incumbent councillor Blair Griffiths ran for mayor and did not stand again for a position as councillor

=== Mayor ===
Candidate	Photo	Affiliation (Note: A candidate may leave their affiliation blank, run as an independent, or run with an affiliation to an organisation, local body ticket or political party. Upper Hutt City Council does not allow whānau, hapū, or iwi details to be used for the affiliation.)	Notes
Blair Griffiths		None	Incumbent councillor
Wayne Guppy		None	Incumbent mayor since 2001
Emma Holderness		Independent	Incumbent councillor since 2022. Also ran for re-election as a councillor.
Angela McLeod		None	Previously ran for the mayoralty in 2022. Also ran to be a councillor.
Hellen Swales		Change we need, voice you deserve	Incumbent deputy mayor, also ran as a councillor
Peri Zee		None	Urban planner and transport adviser

=== Councillors ===
Ten councillors were elected at-large to the city council.

Candidate	Affiliation	Notes
Ramil Adhikari	None	Previously ran for council in 2022
Michael J Anderson	None	
Euan Andrews	None	
Heather Blissett	None	
Dave Burt	Hope resilience and a shared future	
Matt Carey	Independent	Incumbent councillor
Wade Cashmore	Independent	
Gurpreet Dhillon	None	
Henry Grey	None	
Tofa Gush	Our Community	
Bill Hammond	Independent	Incumbent councillor
Emma Holderness	Independent	Incumbent councillor since 2022. Also ran for mayor.
Teresa Homan	Independent	
Rachel Tukaki Kingi	None	
Nigel Mander	Serve the community	
Kylie McKenna	Independent	
Angela McLeod	None	Also ran for mayor
David (DJ) McNicholas	None	
Heather Newell	None	Incumbent councillor
Hellen Swales	The voice you deserve	Incumbent deputy mayor, also ran for mayor
Brett Thomson	None	
Tracey Ultra	Independent	Incumbent councillor
Daniel Welch	Backing the Future of Upper Hutt	
Dave Wheeler	None	Incumbent councillor
Corey White	Independent	

== Results ==
Overall turnout was 50.06%, with 16,728 voting papers returned.

With final results, the following candidates were declared elected:

=== Mayor ===
In an upset, urban planner and transport advisor Peri Zee defeated incumbent mayor of 24 years Wayne Guppy, who had been seeking a ninth term in office.

2025 Upper Hutt mayoral election
Party	Candidate	Votes	%	±%
Independent	Peri Zee	5,479	32.75	(new)
Independent	Wayne Guppy^{†}	3,931	23.50	−17.18
Independent	Angela McLeod	1,941	11.60	(new)
Independent	Blair Griffiths	1,892	11.31	+1.89
Independent	Emma Holderness	1,843	11.02	(new)
Independent	Hellen Swales	1,511	9.03	−0.50
Informal votes		15	0.09	−0.08
Blank votes		116	0.69	−0.18
Turnout		16,728	50.54	+6.59
Registered electors		33,100		
Independent gain from Independent				
^{†} incumbent

=== Council ===
2025 Upper Hutt City Council election
Party	Candidate	Votes	%	±%
Independent	Emma Holderness^{†}	9,251	55.30	+10.92
Independent	Tracey Ultra^{†}	7,903	47.24	+3.15
Independent	Angela McLeod	7,651	45.74	(new)
Independent	Dave Wheeler^{†}	6,836	40.87	−10.82
Independent	Corey White	6,807	40.69	(new)
Independent	Hellen Swales^{†}	6,424	38.40	−11.98
Independent	Bill Hammond^{†}	6,117	36.57	−7.99
Independent	Daniel Welch	5,963	35.65	(new)
Independent	Matt Carey^{†}	5,892	35.22	−9.82
Independent	Gurpreet Dhillon	5,777	34.53	(new)
Independent	Tofa Gush	5,710	34.13	(new)
Independent	Euan Andrews	5,552	33.19	(new)
Independent	Henry Grey	5,381	32.17	(new)
Independent	Rachel Tukaki	5,182	30.98	(new)
Independent	Brett Thomson	5,029	30.06	(new)
Independent	Kylie McKenna	4,565	27.29	(new)
Independent	Heather Newell^{†}	4,248	25.39	−20.78
Independent	Dave Burt	3,853	23.03	(new)
Independent	Wade Cashmore	3,760	22.48	(new)
Independent	Ramil Adhikari	3,733	22.32	−5.84
Independent	Michael J Anderson	3,460	20.68	−1.56
Independent	David (DJ) McNicholas	3,164	18.91	(new)
Independent	Teresa Homan	3,087	18.45	−11.35
Independent	Heather Blissett	2,878	17.20	(new)
Independent	Nigel Mander	2,844	17.00	+8.40
Informal votes		51	0.30	+0.01
Blank votes		172	1.03	−0.52
Turnout		16,728	50.54	+6.59
Registered electors		33,100		
Independent hold				
Independent hold				
Independent gain from Independent				
Independent hold				
Independent gain from Independent				
Independent hold				
Independent hold				
Independent gain from Independent				
Independent hold				
Independent gain from Independent				
^{†} incumbent

== See also ==
- 2025 Greater Wellington Regional Council election
- 2025 Hutt City Council election
- 2025 Wellington City Council election
- 2025 Porirua City Council election
- 2025 Kāpiti Coast District Council election
