= Whakatīkei River =

- Route of the Whakatīkei River
- Mouth of the Whakatīkei River Whakatīkei River (North Island)
- Native name: Whakatīkei (Māori)

Location
- Country: New Zealand
- Island: North Island
- Region: Wellington
- District: Upper Hutt

Physical characteristics
- Source: Wainui
  - coordinates: 41.01394°S 174.97976°E
- Mouth: Te Awa Kairangi / Hutt River
  - location: Riverstone Terraces
  - coordinates: 41°06′48″S 175°03′04″E
- Length: 15 km (9.3 mi)
- Basin size: 82 km^{2} (32 sq mi)

Basin features
- Progression: Whakatīkei River → Te Awa Kairangi / Hutt River → Wellington Harbour → Cook Strait → Pacific Ocean
- Cities: Riverstone Terraces (Upper Hutt)
- Tributaries
  - left: Titi Stream, Dopers Creek
  - right: Paddys Creek, Wainui Stream
- Bridges: Rallywoods Road Bridge, Hutt River Trail Footbridge

The Whakatīkei River is a river of the Wellington Region of New Zealand's North Island. It flows generally southeast from its sources close to the west coast, 5 kilometres (3 mi) southeast of Paekākāriki, and reaches the Hutt River at Upper Hutt.

== Etymology ==
The river's name origin comes from Māori, meaning "extend towards".

== Geography ==
The river flows southeast from Wainui, a hill located southeast of Paekākāriki, heading towards Te Awa Kairangi / Hutt River. Most of the river is forested, with some areas of swamplands. Much of the river's catchment area is formed from native forests and scrubland, with a minority of managed pine forests. Very little urban development has occurred in the Whakatīkei River catchment.

== History ==
In 2008, a dam was proposed to be constructed on the Whakatīkei River to meet growing needs for drinking water.

== Recreation ==
The river flows through the Akatarawa Forest regional park.

== See also ==
- List of rivers of Wellington Region
- List of rivers of New Zealand
