= Riverstone Terraces =

Suburb of Upper Hutt City, New Zealand

- Suburb
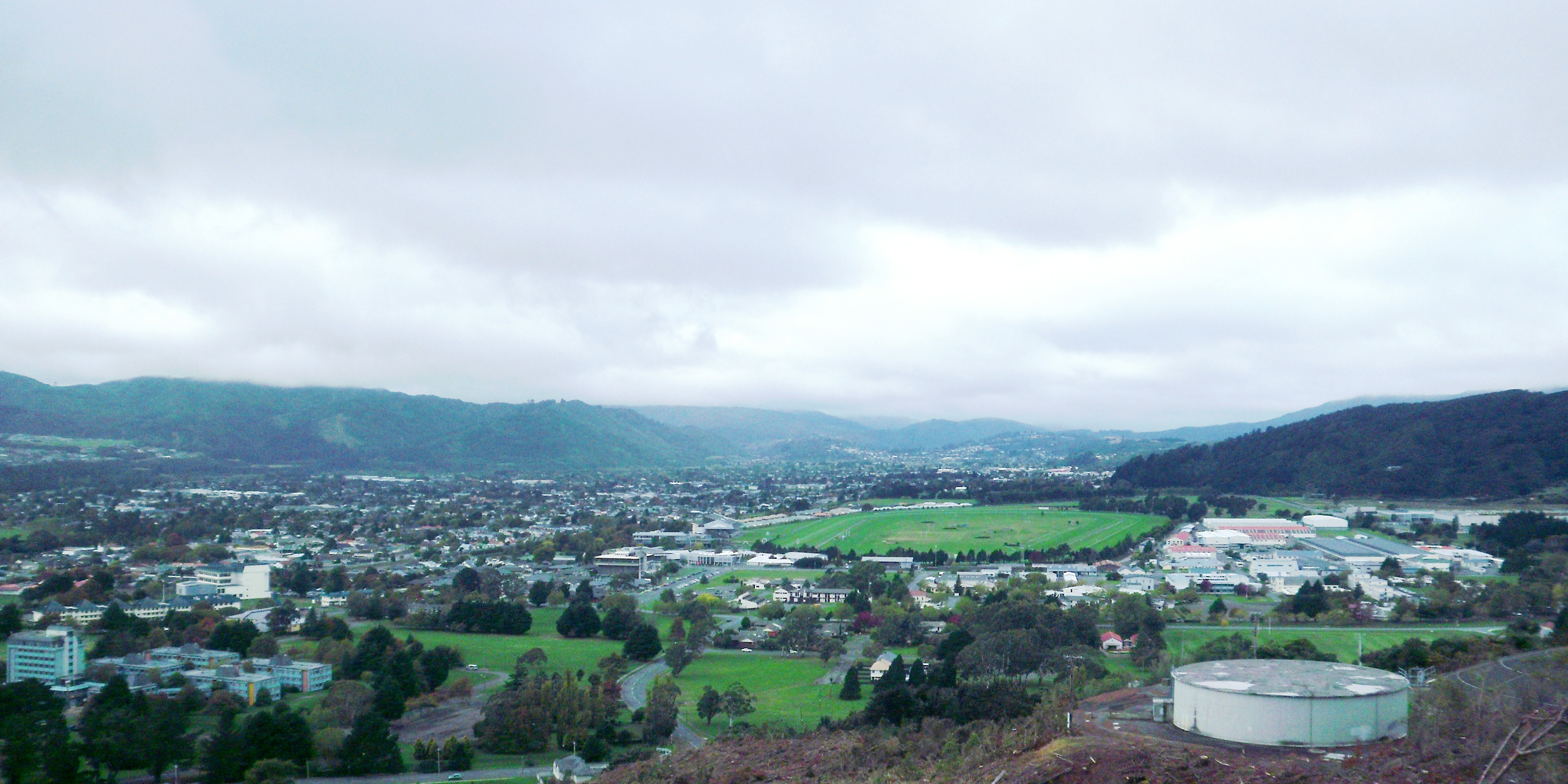
- Interactive map of Riverstone Terraces
- Coordinates: 41.113°S 175.040°E
- Country: New Zealand
- Region: Wellington Region
- Territorial authority: Upper Hutt
- Established: September 1992
- Electorates: Remutaka; Ikaroa-Rāwhiti (Māori)

Government
  - Territorial Authority: Upper Hutt City Council
  - Regional council: Greater Wellington Regional Council
  - Mayor of Upper Hutt: Peri Zee
  - Remutaka MP: Chris Hipkins
  - Ikaroa-Rāwhiti MP: Cushla Tangaere-Manuel

Area
  - Total: 2.24 km^{2} (0.86 sq mi)

Population (June 2025)
  - Total: 1,930
  - Density: 862/km^{2} (2,230/sq mi)

Riverstone Terraces (commonly referred to as simply 'Riverstone') is a suburb of Upper Hutt in the Hutt Valley of New Zealand's North Island, perched on a hill previously known as Craig's Flat, above the Hutt River.

Although mostly residential, the suburb also contains bush walks, a children's playground, and the suburb formerly harboured a small convenience store. The nearest supermarket is in central Upper Hutt, 4.9 to 8.1km away (depending on where one starts in the suburb). The suburb's streets commemorate the names of notable Upper Hutt residents, including Frankie Stevens, James Nairn, Paul Swain and Cory Jane.

A peak-time Metlink bus service, route 113, services the suburb.

== Demographics ==
Riverstone Terraces statistical area covers 2.24 km^{2} (0.86 sq mi). It had an estimated population of 1,930 as of June 2025, with a population density of 862 people per km^{2}.

Historical population
| Year | Pop. | ±% p.a. |
|---|---|---|
| 2006 | 660 | — |
| 2013 | 1,383 | +11.15% |
| 2018 | 1,776 | +5.13% |
| 2023 | 1,833 | +0.63% |

Riverstone Terraces had a population of 1,833 in the 2023 New Zealand census, an increase of 57 people (3.2%) since the 2018 census, and an increase of 450 people (32.5%) since the 2013 census. There were 909 males, 918 females, and 9 people of other genders in 582 dwellings. 2.3% of people identified as LGBTIQ+. The median age was 38.6 years (compared with 38.1 years nationally). There were 387 people (21.1%) aged under 15 years, 312 (17.0%) aged 15 to 29, 942 (51.4%) aged 30 to 64, and 195 (10.6%) aged 65 or older.

People could identify as more than one ethnicity. The results were 70.4% European (Pākehā); 10.0% Māori; 5.6% Pasifika; 22.4% Asian; 2.8% Middle Eastern, Latin American and African New Zealanders (MELAA); and 2.9% other, which includes people giving their ethnicity as "New Zealander". English was spoken by 96.2%, Māori by 2.1%, Samoan by 1.6%, and other languages by 22.3%. No language could be spoken by 2.1% (e.g. too young to talk). New Zealand Sign Language was known by 0.3%. The percentage of people born overseas was 35.0, compared with 28.8% nationally.

Religious affiliations were 35.8% Christian, 6.4% Hindu, 1.3% Islam, 0.3% Māori religious beliefs, 1.8% Buddhist, 0.2% New Age, and 2.9% other religions. People who answered that they had no religion were 45.5%, and 6.1% of people did not answer the census question.

Of those at least 15 years old, 429 (29.7%) people had a bachelor's or higher degree, 738 (51.0%) had a post-high school certificate or diploma, and 279 (19.3%) people exclusively held high school qualifications. The median income was $63,200, compared with $41,500 nationally. 369 people (25.5%) earned over $100,000 compared to 12.1% nationally. The employment status of those at least 15 was 921 (63.7%) full-time, 177 (12.2%) part-time, and 36 (2.5%) unemployed.
