= Akatarawa Forest =

Regional park in New Zealand

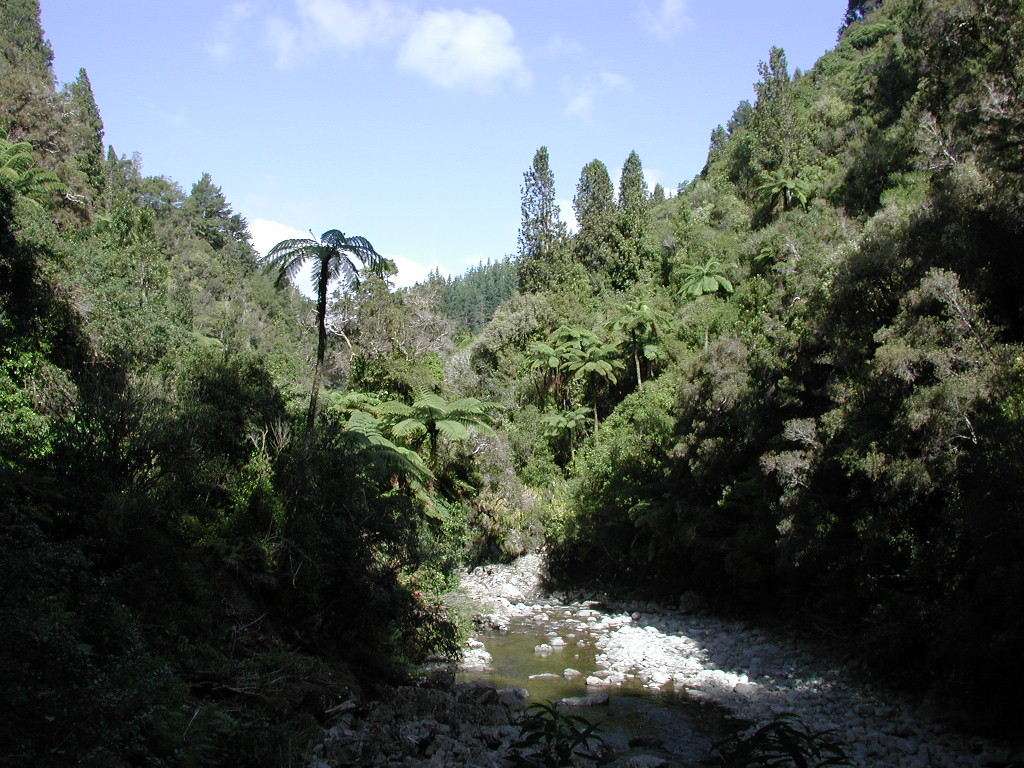
- Karapoti Gorge in the Akatarawa Forest
- Interactive map of Akatarawa Forest
- Location: Upper Hutt, Wellington Region, New Zealand
- Nearest city: Upper Hutt
- Coordinates: 41°02′27.4″S 175°02′13.2″E
- Area: 15,000 hectares (37,000 acres)
- Operator: Greater Wellington Regional Council

Akatarawa Forest is a regional park in the Upper Hutt within the Wellington Region at the southern tip of the North Island of New Zealand. It encompasses 15,000 hectares of native and plantation forest. It includes the headwaters of the Maungakotukutuku Steam, Akatarawa River West and the Whakatīkei River.

The park is owned and managed by Greater Wellington Regional Council, making it one of the largest landowners in New Zealand.

Akatarawa is a Māori name meaning 'Trailing vines'.

Activities include cycling, hunting, fishing, horse riding, 4WD-vehicle trips and trail biking, including at the Karapoti Gorge.

== History ==
Akatarawa Forest has ancient northern rātā which predate human habitation of New Zealand, including one tree which is believed to be 1100 years old. Some of these trees are wider than Tāne Mahuta. One is largest rātā tree in New Zealand, at 39 metres tall.

Greater Wellington Regional Council carried out a 1080 dropping programme in 2013 to reduce pest species.

A trailbiker was seriously injured in the park in July 2017. A dirt-biker was rescued from the forest in February 2021.

Between December 2017 and August 2018, a 1.7 kilometre zig-zag track that is part of the Cannon Point Walkway was closed to the public due to a disagreement between Upper Hutt City Council and a private landowner over land access.

In early 2021, Forest and Bird campaigned for Upper Hutt City Council to keep a 35-hectare block as a wildlife corridor and reserve, connecting Akatarawa Forest with Wainuiomata.

In July 2021, a further 1080 operation was carried out in 2021 to combat a resurgence in possum numbers.
