= Staglands Wildlife Reserve =

Nature reserve in New Zealand

- Staglands Wildlife Reserve Cafe
- Interactive map of Staglands Wildlife Reserve
- 40°59′15″S 175°07′24″E
- Date opened: 1972
- Location: 2362 Akatarawa Road, Upper Hutt, Wellington Region, New Zealand
- Website: www.staglands.co.nz

Staglands Wildlife Reserve is a wildlife park located in the Akatarawa Valley, 20 km north of Upper Hutt in New Zealand. It was established in 1972 by English immigrant John Simister. Besides native birds, including rare waterfowl such as whio and pāteke, the park maintains a variety of farm animals, including rare breeds such as kunekune. Along with Michael Willis from Christchurch's Willowbank Wildlife Reserve, Simister has been credited with saving the kunekune from extinction.

== Gallery ==
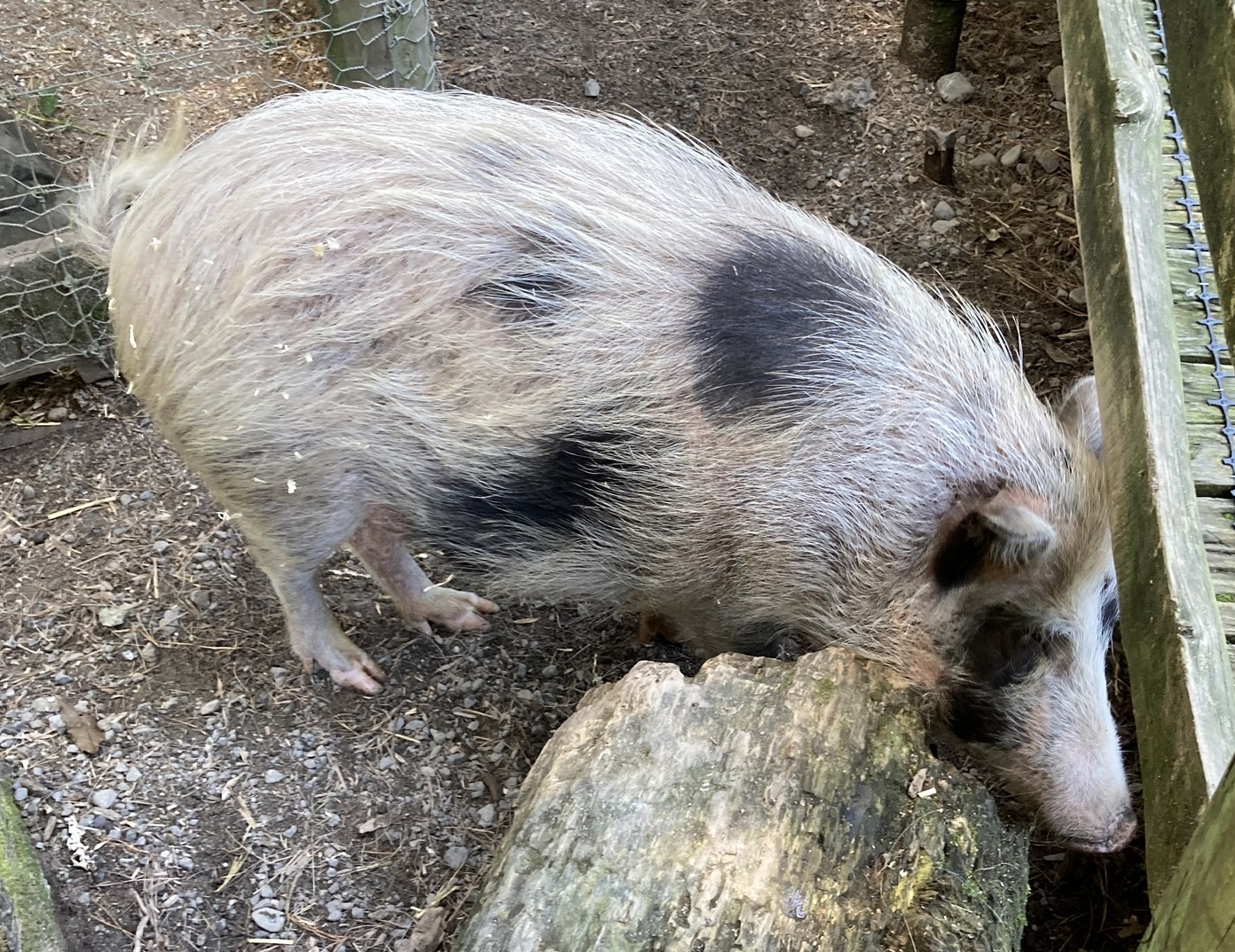
Auckland Island pig

Kea

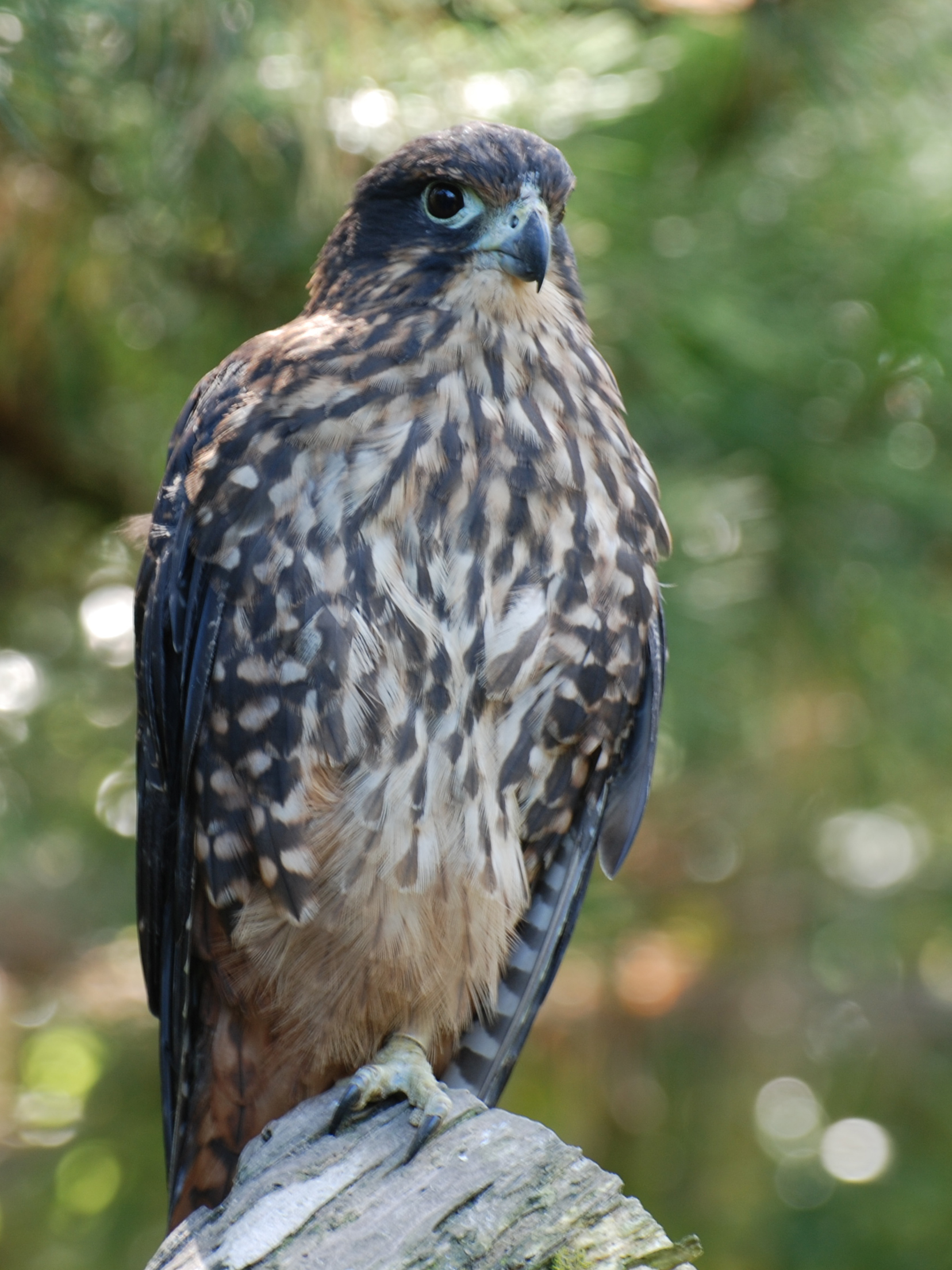
New Zealand falcon
