= Cannon Point Walkway =

Hiking trail in New Zealand

Coordinates: 41°05′17.88″S 175°03′51.84″E

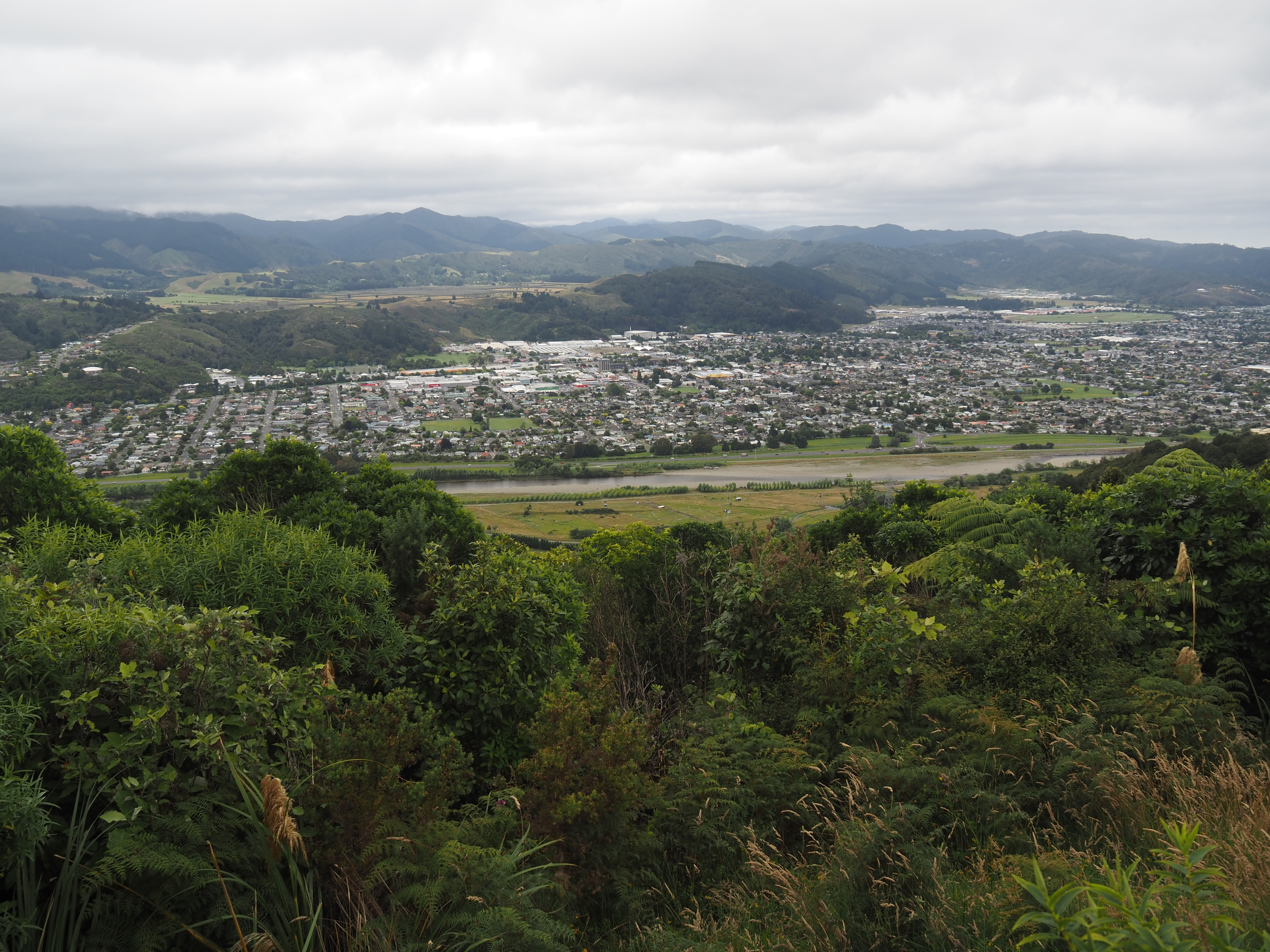
- Hutt Valley from Cannon Point trig
- Length: 7.7 km (4.8 mi)
- Location: Akatarawa Forest, New Zealand
- Trailheads: Bridge Road, Birchville, Tulsa Reserve, Tōtara Park
- Use: Nature walk
- Elevation change: 304 m (997 ft)
- Highest point: 341 m (1,119 ft)
- Lowest point: 65 m (213 ft)
- Difficulty: Moderate
- Season: Year round
- Maintainer: Greater Wellington Regional Council

The Cannon Point Walkway is a hiking trail in the Akatarawa Forest on the western side of the Hutt Valley in the North Island of New Zealand. The walkway is a loop of 7.7 kilometres (4.8 mi) in length, ascending to the Cannon Point trig at 341 metres (1,119 ft), and with a total elevation gain of 304 metres (997 ft). The portion of the track through the Akatarawa Forest Park is maintained by the Greater Wellington Regional Council.

The name of the hill and the walkway comes from the reports of a large tree that fell near the top of the hill. The fallen tree was said to look like a cannon when viewed from below. The area was part of Valley View Station, and the steep zig-zag track to the summit was originally cut by the farm owners for access on foot and horseback.

The road ends are at Bridge Road, Birchville and Tulsa Reserve in Tōtara Park. The route from Bridge Road follows the path of a former water supply pipeline upstream along Clarke's Creek to the historic Birchville Dam. From the dam there is a steep ascent to the ridgeline and then along to the Cannon Point trig at 341 metres (1,119 ft) elevation. From the trig there are panoramic views of the Hutt Valley. The loop is completed by a walk along the banks of the Hutt River between the two road ends.

On Sunday 9 October 1932, a "mystery" railway excursion to Upper Hutt attracted 800 people, many of whom took the opportunity to complete a hike of around 10 miles (16 km) from the Akatarawa picnic grounds to the lookout at Cannon Point.

A 1.7-kilometre-long (1.1 mi) zig-zag portion of the track from Tulsa Park up to the Cannon Point trig crosses private land, and was closed by the landowner in December 2017 after a dispute between the landowner and the Upper Hutt City Council. Access was restored in August 2018.

A new bridge at the Birchville end of the track was opened in October 2022.

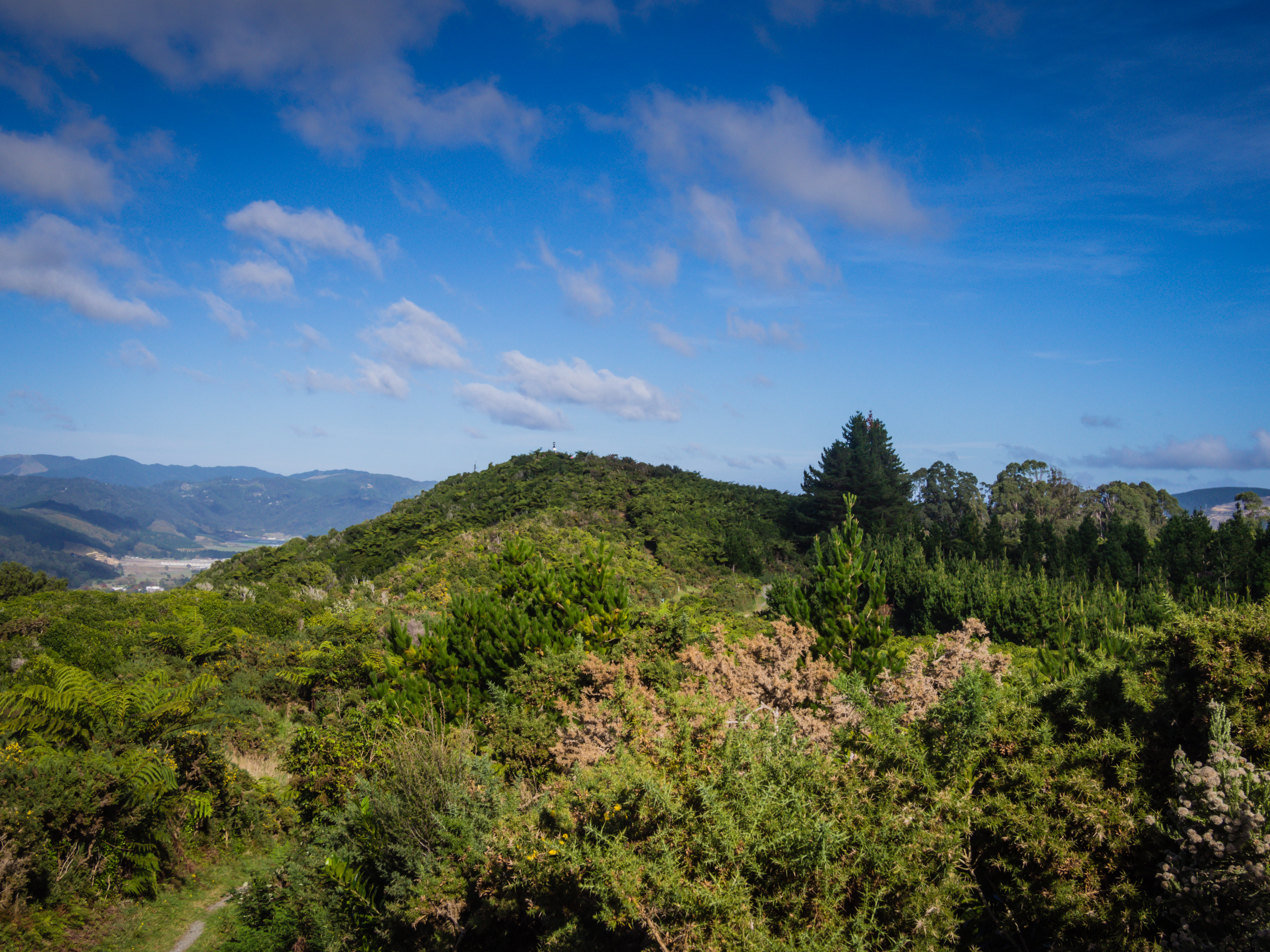
View of Cannon Point trig from walkway
