= Kunekune =

Breed of pig

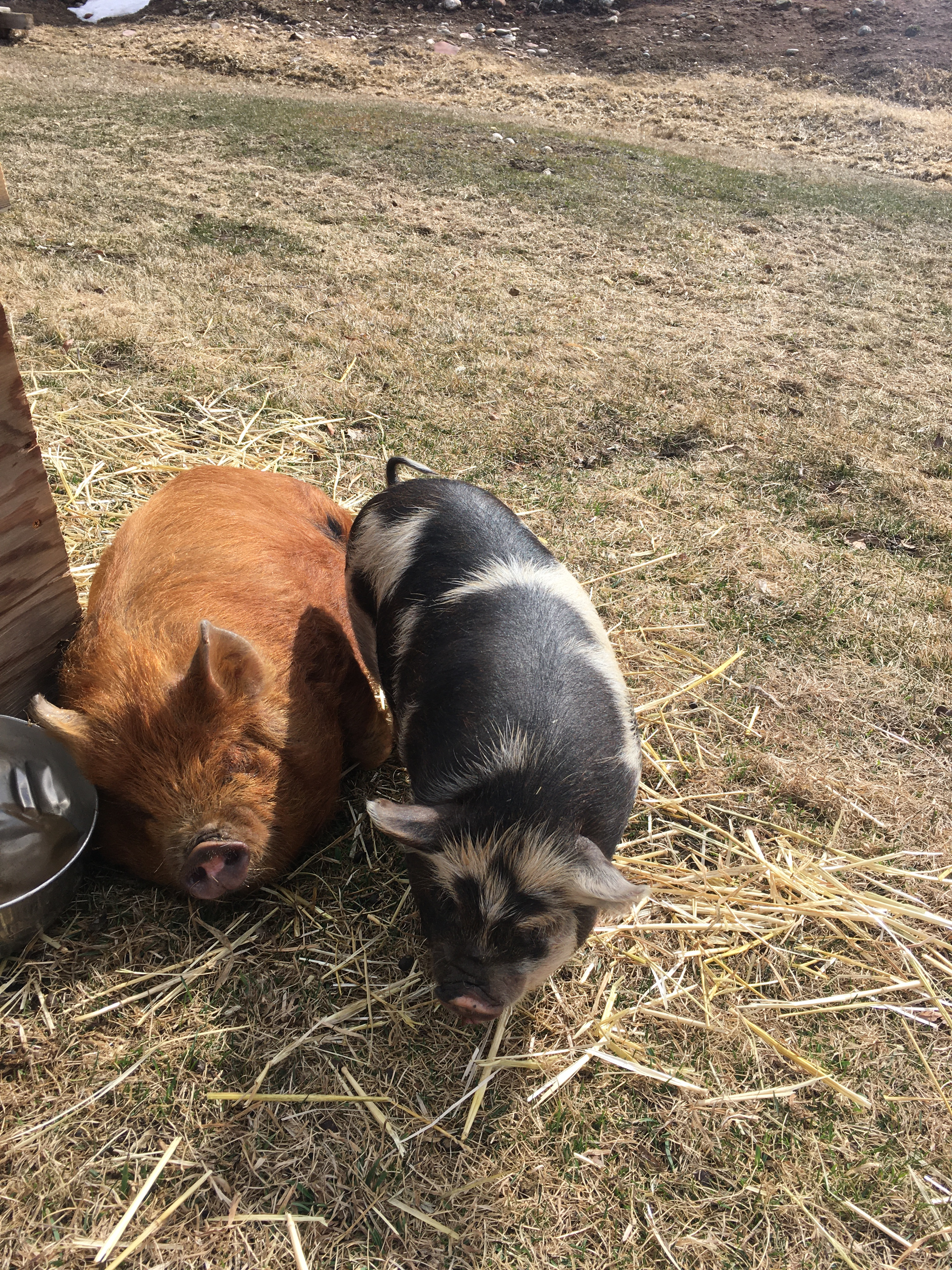
- Male (left), female (right), Kunekune pigs
- Conservation status: Rare
- Country of origin: New Zealand

Traits

The kunekune (Māori pronunciation: [kʉnɛkʉnɛ]) is a small breed of domestic pig from New Zealand. Kunekune are hairy with a rotund build, and may bear wattles hanging from their lower jaws. Their colour ranges from black and white, to ginger, cream, gold-tip, black, brown, and tricoloured. They have a docile, friendly nature.

== History ==
The breed is believed to have descended from an Asian domestic breed introduced to New Zealand in the early 19th century by whalers or traders. They differ markedly from the feral pig of European origin known in New Zealand as a "Captain Cooker". The native Māori people of New Zealand adopted Kunekune; kunekune is a Māori word meaning 'fat and round'.

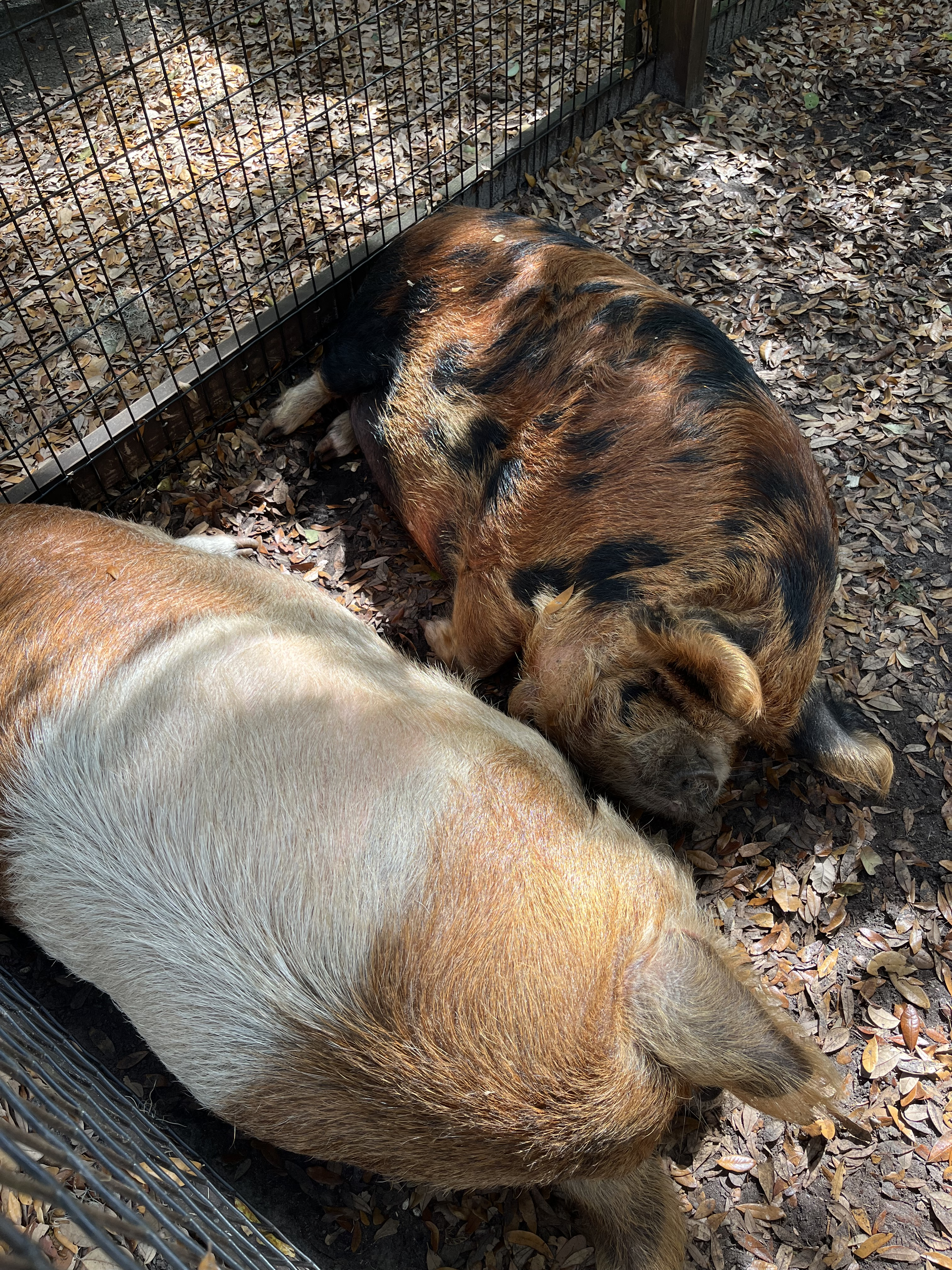
2 Kunekune pigs sleeping

By the 1980s, only an estimated 50 purebred Kunekune remained. Michael Willis and John Simister, wildlife park owners, started a breeding recovery programme, which encouraged other recovery efforts. As of 2010, the breed no longer faces extinction, with breed societies in both New Zealand and the United Kingdom. In 1993, two were imported into the United States from the UK.

== Behaviour ==
In 2017, a report of Science Daily said the Kunekune has remarkable social learning with "astonishingly good memory".

== Appearance ==
The Kunekune is covered in hair which can be long or short, and straight or curly. Hair colours include black, brown, ginger, gold, cream, and spotted combinations. It has a medium to short, slightly upturned snout, often black, and either semilopped or pricked ears. It has a short, round body with short legs and may have two wattles (called piri piri) under its chin. The Kunekune stands about 60 cm (24 in) tall. An adult Kunekune male can weigh between 90 and 136 kg (198 and 300 lb), with females typically weighing between 54 and 90 kg (119 and 198 lb).

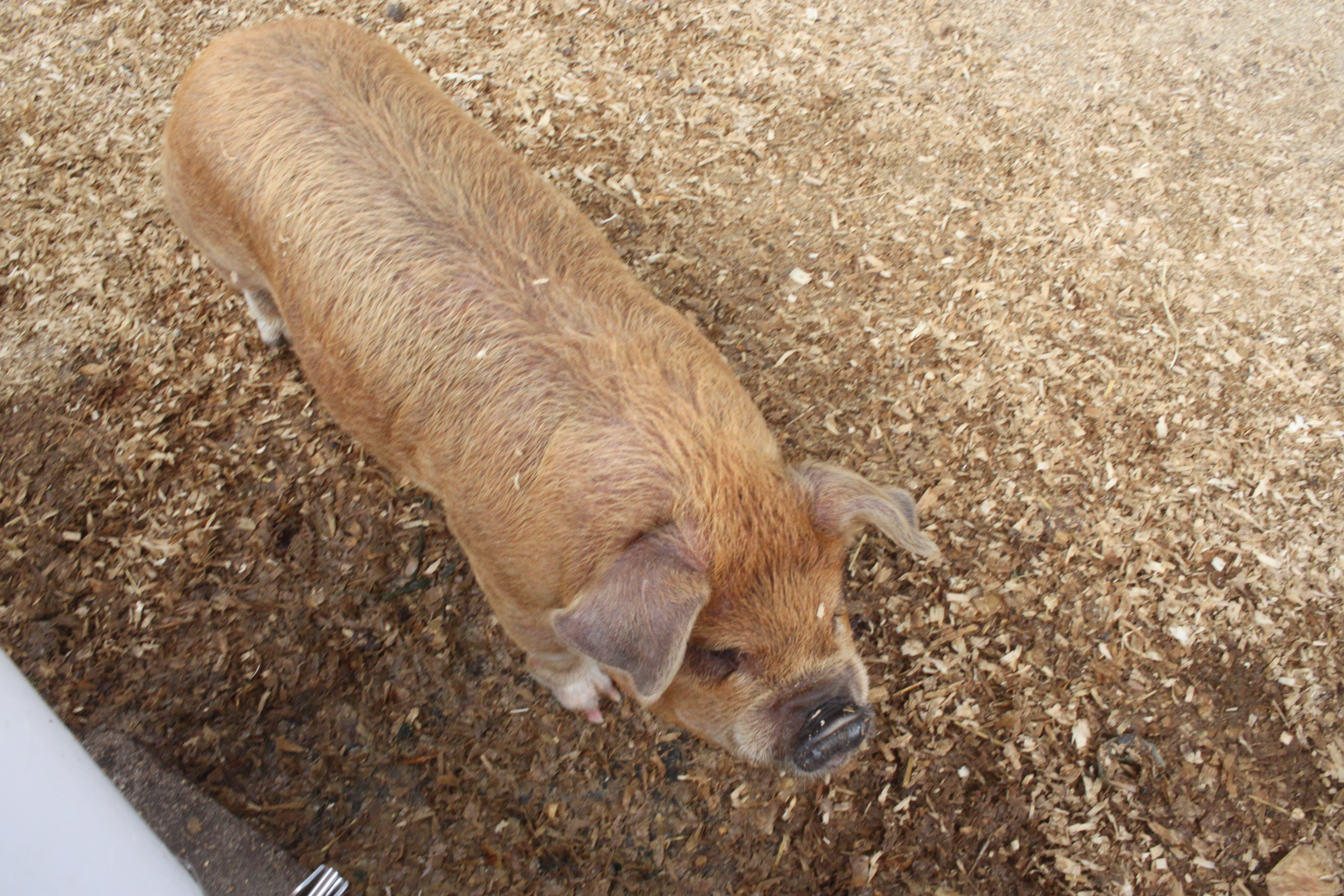
Ginger Kunekune pig with short hair

== As pets ==
Kunekune can be kept as pets in New Zealand and are a recognised breed of miniature pig.

Kunekune cannot be imported into Australia, as Australia does not allow the import of live pigs for biosecurity reasons. However, breeders have created an alternative Australian breed: the Australian miniature pig.
