= Cloustonville =

- Suburb
- Cloustonville (New Zealand)
- Coordinates: 41.0060°S 175.1254°E
- Country: New Zealand
- Island: North Island
- City: Upper Hutt

Population (2006)
  - Total: 348

Cloustonville is a small settlement in the Akatarawa Valley of New Zealand's North Island, north of Upper Hutt in the foothills of the Tararua Range. The 2006 New Zealand census recorded Cloustonville's population as 348, a rise of 24 people since the 2001 census. A sawmill once operated in Cloustonville and it was served by a bush tramway.

The Cloustonville Area Unit was replaced by the Akatarawa statistical area in the 2018 census.
