= Price's Bush Tramway =

Coordinates: 41.040718°S 175.070717°E

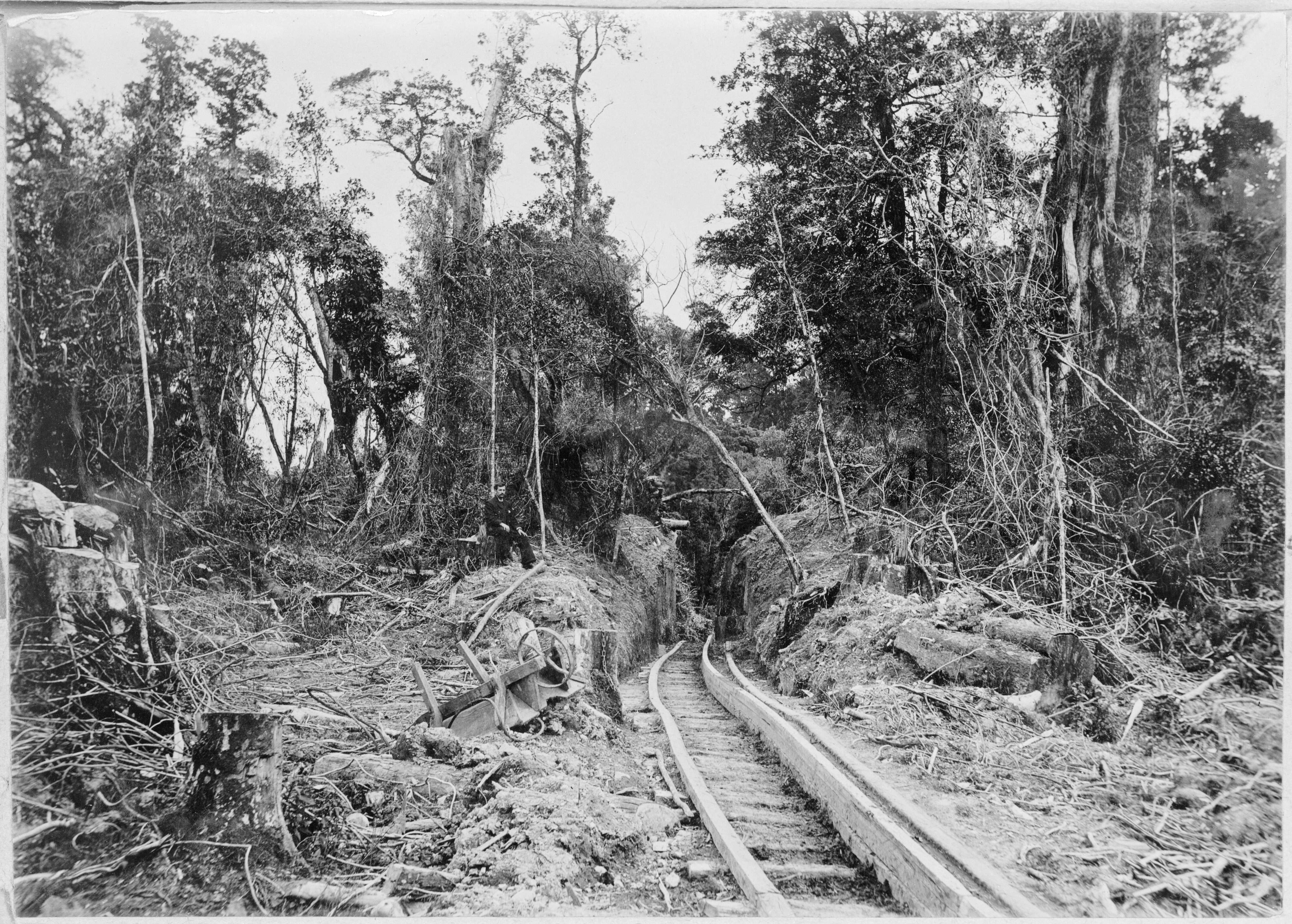
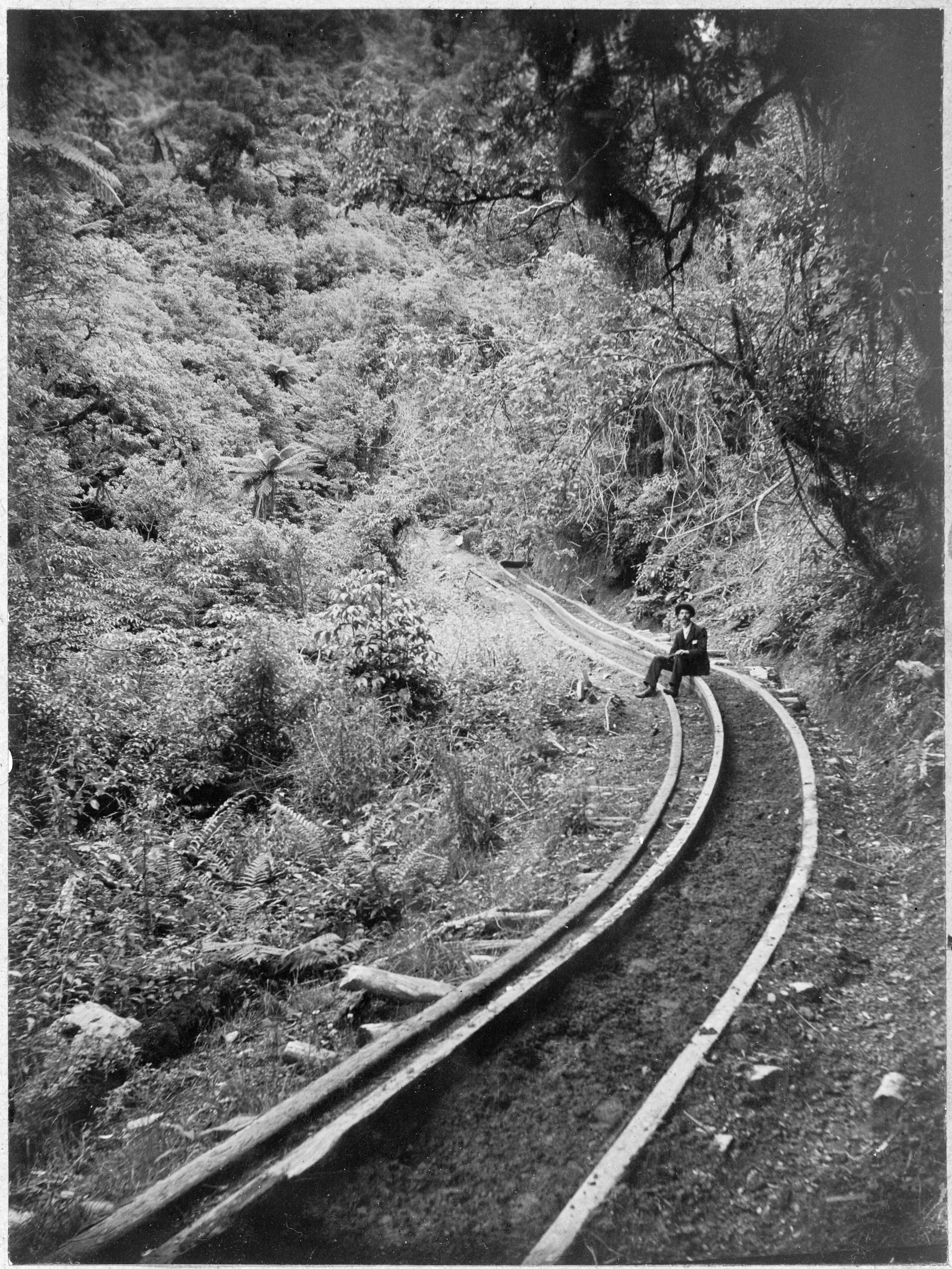
- Bush tramway with a wooden Fell rail, Price's Bush at Akatarawa, circa 1903 Wooden rails of the bush railway in Price's Bush at Akatarawa, circa 1903

Technical
- Track gauge: 3 1/2 or 4 ft 1,067 or 1,219 mm

Price's Bush Tramway was a bush tramway built around 1903 near Akatarawa in the Tararua Range of New Zealand's North Island. It was built with a raised Fell third rail for braking the loaded trucks, as used by the Rimutaka Incline.

== History ==
Price's Bush was an area owned and milled by Thomas Price (1838–1906), who owned milling operations in Lower Hutt and Petone. It lay in the upper reaches of the Hutt Valley to Waikanae on the Kāpiti Coast in a rugged hill country.

The tramway had wooden rails with a track gauge of 3 1/2 or 4 feet (1,067 or 1,219 mm) equal to that of the main line or Wellington tram respectively. Between the two rails, on which the wheels ran, there was a raised wooden rail. This was used for braking the loaden trucks downhill, as known from the Fell mountain railway system on the Rimutaka Incline.

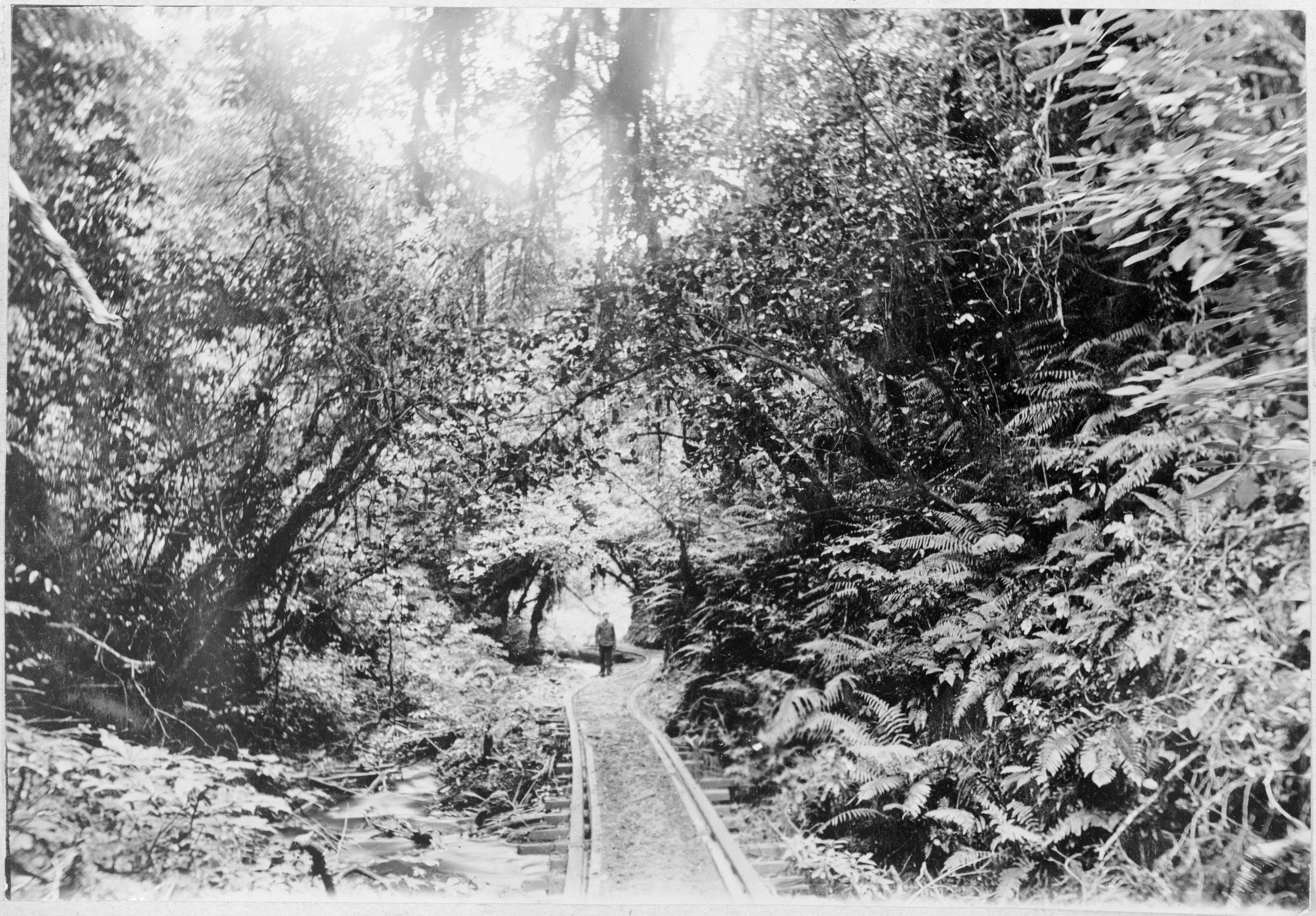
Bush tramway showing wooden rails in Price's Bush at Akatarawa, 1903

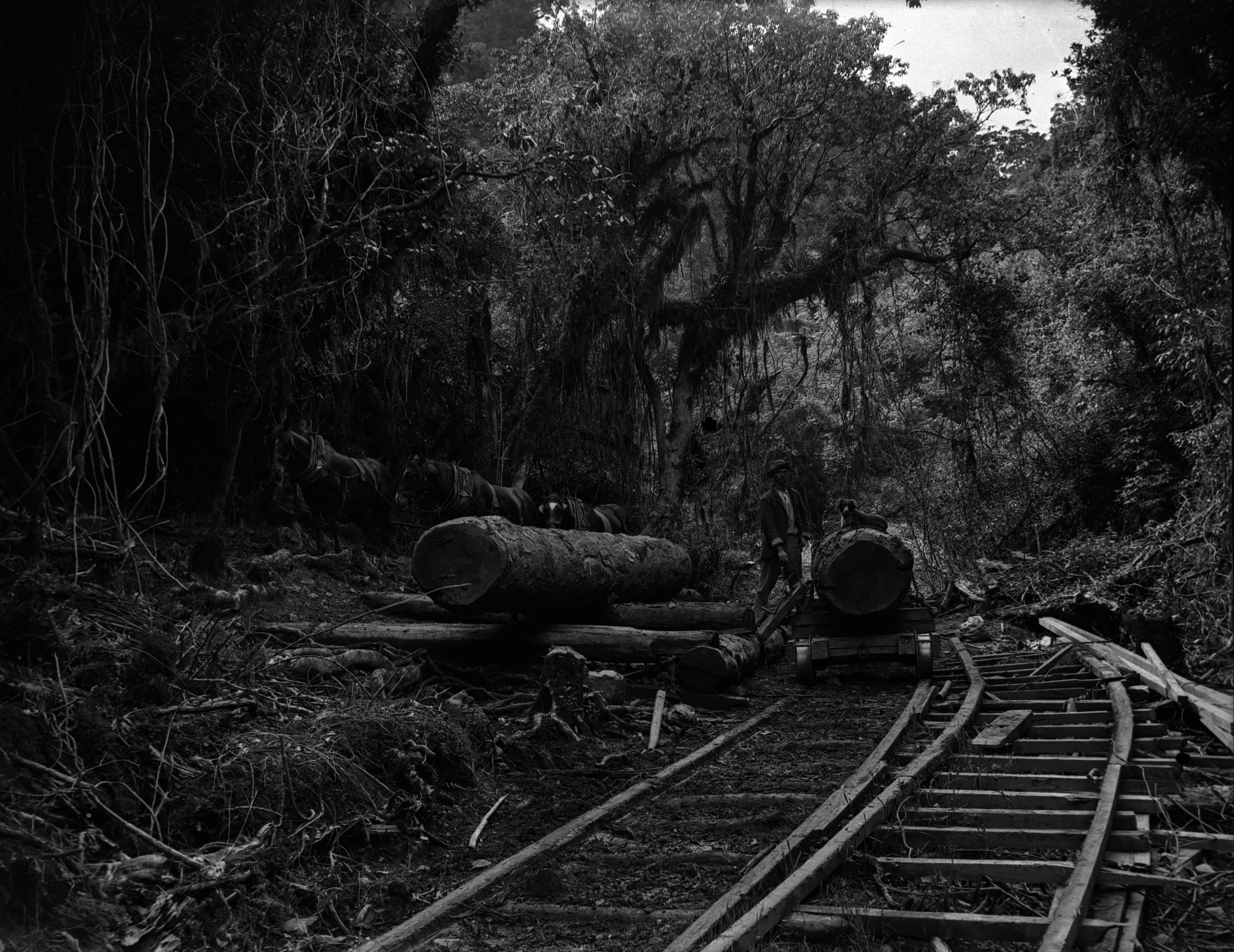
Transporting logs with horses in the Akatarawa Bush, Hutt Valley, 1912–1916

== Additional literature ==
- Tony Walzl: Akatarawa and Pakuratahi Forests History.
