= Wayne Guppy =

New Zealand politician (born 1954)

Wayne Guppy JP
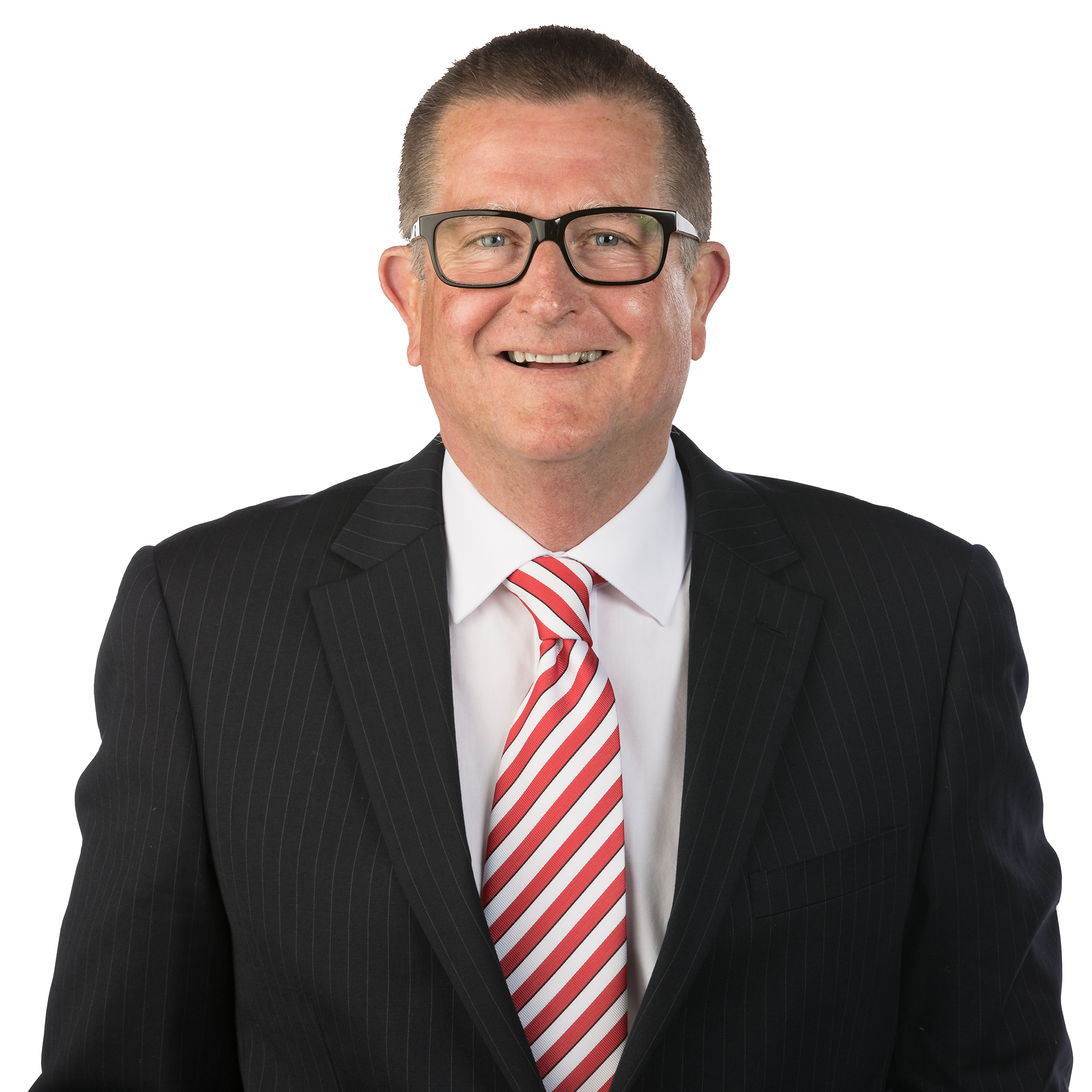
- Guppy in 2016

11th Mayor of Upper Hutt
- In office October 2001 – 17 October 2025
- Preceded by: Rex Kirton
- Succeeded by: Peri Zee

Personal details
- Born: Wayne Noel Guppy; 31 August 1954 (age 71) Upper Hutt, New Zealand
- Spouse: Sue Guppy
- Profession: Pharmacist

Wayne Noel Guppy JP (born 31 August 1954) is a New Zealand local-body politician. He was the Mayor of Upper Hutt between 2001 and 2025.

== Early life ==
Guppy was born in Upper Hutt on 31 August 1954, the son of Colin Guppy, a police officer, and Joy Guppy. He was educated at St. Patrick's College, Silverstream, and obtained a Doctor of Pharmacy from the University of Nebraska Medical Center.

In 1987, Guppy was a lecturer in clinical pharmacy at Hutt Hospital, and group chairman of the pharmacy practice department at Upper Hutt's Central Institute of Technology, while his wife, Sue, ran Guppy's Dispensary in Upper Hutt.

== Personal life ==
Guppy is married to Sue and they have two daughters. They live in the Upper Hutt suburb of Heretaunga. Guppy is currently the president of the Upper Hutt Rugby Football Club. He is a justice of the peace.

== Mayor of Upper Hutt ==
Guppy was first elected to the Upper Hutt City Council in 1998, and was the chair of the Consents Committee for that three-year term. At the next local body election in 2001, he was elected Mayor of Upper Hutt with a majority of around 6,000 votes and was mayor until 2025 where he lost to Peri Zee. In the 2007 local election, he was returned unopposed. Guppy and Chris Hipkins launched a petition in 2009 opposing the proposed merger of the Upper Hutt and Lower Hutt police districts.

=== 2025 Wellington – LIVE Controversy ===
Guppy ran for a ninth term as mayor in the 2025 local elections, where he lost the position to his main opponent Peri Zee. Many speculated that his association with local social media brand Wellington – LIVE had contributed to his loss, after the owner of Wellington – LIVE Graham Bloxham faced public backlash for a series of abusive emails sent to Zee shortly before the election on 1 September, with media outlet The Spinoff clear-copied into the email chain. The Spinoff quoted one email in an article published on 10 September:

I understood you were a reactive “victim type person”. That to me is a shit stirrer, whisperer and dirty under handed player.

“in my opinion” you’re in experienced shows out, flip flopping on issues, and have a “weird woke – aggressive style”, and to be frank the people that are driving you and your narritive will fuck Upper Hutt.

Please DO NOT continue to wind me, or people around me up. Failing this or a ramp up of your bullshit will see a wind up at my end too.

Both Guppy and Bloxham denied any involvement with one another however evidence pointed to Wellington – LIVE running a social media campaign on Guppy's behalf.

=== Amalgamation ===
In 2009, Guppy stated his opposition to the amalgamation of Wellington region councils to form a super-city.

=== Water infrastructure controversies ===
In 2023, Guppy publicly criticised Wellington Water, an asset management company jointly owned by most councils in the Wellington Region. The company manages the water infrastructure in Upper Hutt on behalf of the city council. Wellington Water reported that 52% of the drinking water supplied to the city was being lost through leaks. An Upper Hutt councillor claimed that the state of the water network was the result of decades of under-investment, and that the city was currently only replacing 1.5 km (0.93 mi) of water mains each year. Guppy disputed the claims and said that he had "no confidence" in Wellington Water and its advice. Guppy has also strongly opposed the installation of water meters for all consumers, despite the evidence that they lead to significantly reduced demand. In a separate issue related to wastewater, Guppy disputed advice from Wellington Water about the potential need to invest $1 billion in a total replacement of the long sewage outfall pipe from the treatment plant at Seaview to Pencarrow Head, together with upgrades at the treatment plant.

Guppy diverted money from Three Waters funding to pay for floodlights for the rugby club which he is president of. He was accused of a "conflict of interest".

Political offices
Preceded by Rex Kirton	Mayor of Upper Hutt; 2001–2025	Succeeded by Peri Zee
