= Akatarawa Valley =

Rural locality in Wellington Region, New Zealand

Akatarawa
- Rural locality
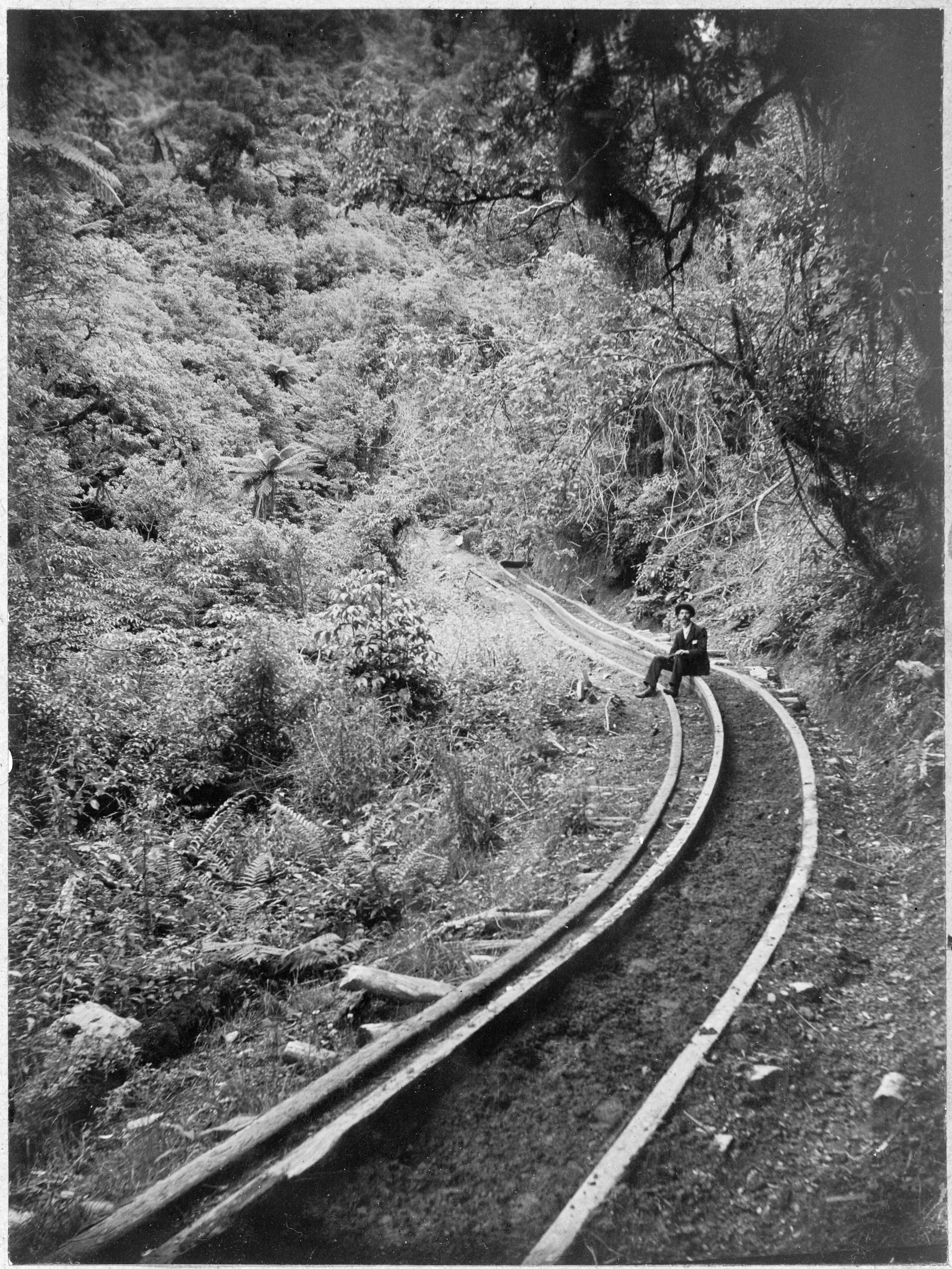
- Price's Bush Tramway, 1903
- Interactive map of Akatarawa
- Coordinates: 41.011597°S 175.170107°E
- Country: New Zealand
- Region: Wellington Region
- Territorial authority: Upper Hutt
- Electorates: Kapiti; Remutaka; Ikaroa-Rāwhiti (Māori); Te Tai Hauāuru (Māori)

Government
  - Territorial Authority: Upper Hutt City Council
  - Regional council: Greater Wellington Regional Council
  - Mayor of Upper Hutt: Peri Zee
  - Kapiti MP/Remutaka MP: Tim Costley/Chris Hipkins
  - Ikaroa-Rāwhiti MP/Te Tai Hauāuru MP: Cushla Tangaere-Manuel/Debbie Ngarewa-Packer

Area
  - Total: 334.15 km^{2} (129.02 sq mi)

Population (June 2025)
  - Total: 790
  - Density: 2.4/km^{2} (6.1/sq mi)

The Akatarawa Valley is a valley in the Tararua Range of New Zealand's North Island. It provides a link from the upper reaches of the Hutt Valley to Waikanae on the Kāpiti Coast through rugged hill country. The valley is lowly populated and contains the localities of Reikorangi and Cloustonville. At the Hutt Valley end, the Akatarawa Valley is rugged and the Akatarawa River flows through it. The terrain is less difficult at the Kapiti end, where the Waikanae River flows through part of the valley on its route from its headwaters in the Tararuas to the Tasman Sea, and is met in the valley by tributaries such as the Ngatiawa River and the Reikorangi Stream.

Many residents are craftspeople or gardeners, and some gardens are open for public viewing. Also located in the valley is a former Salvation Army youth and family camp that has been upgraded and now operated by the Wellesley Group, and Staglands Wildlife Reserve & Cafe, a conservation project established in 1972. It supports many native and rare birds, insects, and animals in conjunction with the New Zealand Department of Conservation.

An early proposal for the North Island Main Trunk Railway's route out of Wellington featured a line deviating from the Hutt Valley Line portion of the Wairarapa Line and running through the Akatarawa Valley to the west coast; see Haywards–Plimmerton Line. This proposal was considered in the 1870s but abandoned when the Wellington and Manawatu Railway Company chose a route directly out of Wellington via Johnsonville and Porirua. A railway through the Akatarawa Valley has not been seriously considered since this stage, though Price's Bush Tramway and other industrial tramways were built to serve private logging interests. The tramways and mills they served are now closed and little evidence remains of their existence.

== Demographics ==
Akatarawa statistical area covers 334.15 km^{2} (129.02 sq mi) and includes the part of Moonshine Valley within Upper Hutt. It had an estimated population of 790 as of June 2025, with a population density of 2.4 people per km^{2}.

Historical population
| Year | Pop. | ±% p.a. |
|---|---|---|
| 2006 | 555 | — |
| 2013 | 606 | +1.26% |
| 2018 | 648 | +1.35% |
| 2023 | 762 | +3.29% |

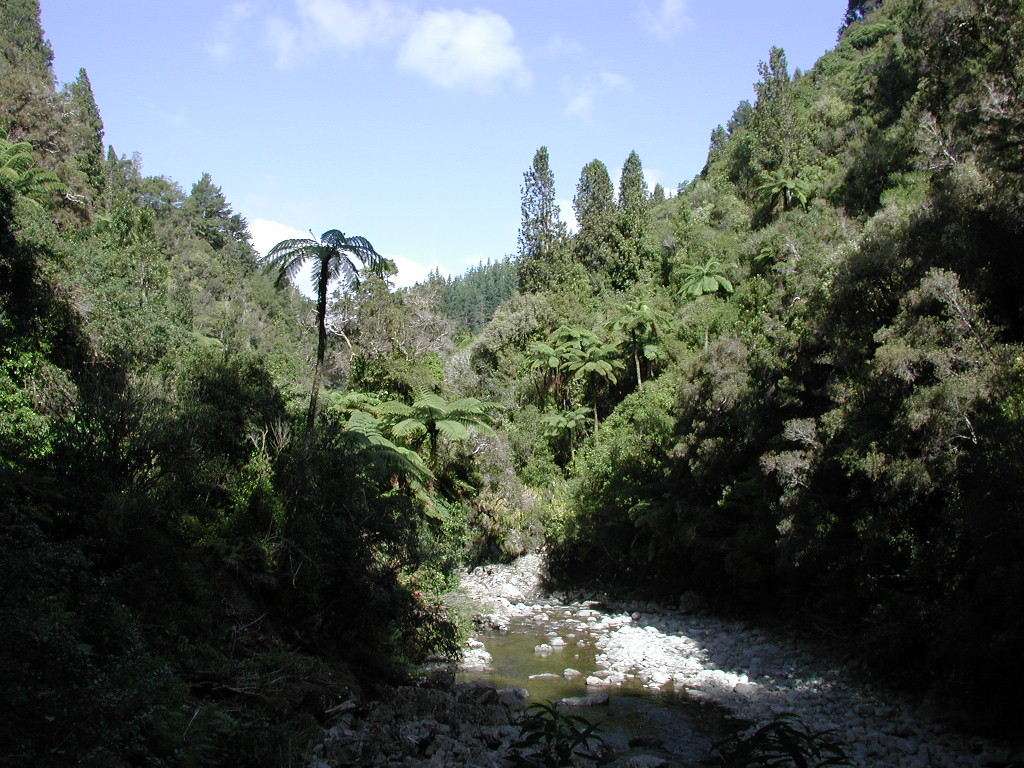
Karapoti Gorge

Akatarawa had a population of 762 in the 2023 New Zealand census, an increase of 114 people (17.6%) since the 2018 census, and an increase of 156 people (25.7%) since the 2013 census. There were 390 males, 369 females, and 6 people of other genders in 261 dwellings. 3.1% of people identified as LGBTIQ+. The median age was 41.7 years (compared with 38.1 years nationally). There were 132 people (17.3%) aged under 15 years, 126 (16.5%) aged 15 to 29, 396 (52.0%) aged 30 to 64, and 108 (14.2%) aged 65 or older.

People could identify as more than one ethnicity. The results were 94.9% European (Pākehā); 12.2% Māori; 2.0% Pasifika; 2.4% Asian; 0.4% Middle Eastern, Latin American and African New Zealanders (MELAA); and 3.1% other, which includes people giving their ethnicity as "New Zealander". English was spoken by 99.2%, Māori by 2.8%, Samoan by 0.4%, and other languages by 9.1%. No language could be spoken by 1.2% (e.g. too young to talk). New Zealand Sign Language was known by 1.6%. The percentage of people born overseas was 23.6, compared with 28.8% nationally.

Religious affiliations were 26.0% Christian, 0.4% Islam, 1.2% New Age, and 1.2% other religions. People who answered that they had no religion were 60.2%, and 10.2% of people did not answer the census question.

Of those at least 15 years old, 165 (26.2%) people had a bachelor's or higher degree, 363 (57.6%) had a post-high school certificate or diploma, and 102 (16.2%) people exclusively held high school qualifications. The median income was $49,300, compared with $41,500 nationally. 123 people (19.5%) earned over $100,000 compared to 12.1% nationally. The employment status of those at least 15 was 378 (60.0%) full-time, 93 (14.8%) part-time, and 6 (1.0%) unemployed.

== See also ==
- Akatarawa Saddle
