= Mayor of Upper Hutt =

Mayor of Upper Hutt City
- Coat of arms of Upper Hutt

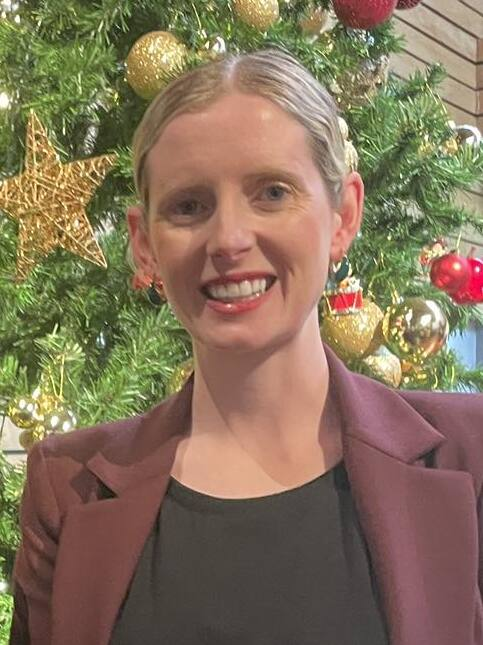
- Incumbent; Peri Zee since 2025
- Style: Her Worship
- Term length: Three years
- Inaugural holder: Percy Kinsman
- Formation: 1966
- Deputy: Corey White
- Salary: $137,871
- Website: Official website

The mayor of Upper Hutt is the head of the municipal government of Upper Hutt, New Zealand, and presides over the Upper Hutt City Council. The mayor is directly elected using a first-past-the-post voting system. The Upper Hutt Town Board had seven chairmen, with the role regarded as the predecessor role of mayor. The Upper Hutt Borough Council was proclaimed in 1926, and with that, the role of mayor was introduced. In 1966, Upper Hutt became a city council. The current mayor, Peri Zee, was first elected in 2025 and is the twelfth since the role was created in 1926.

== History ==
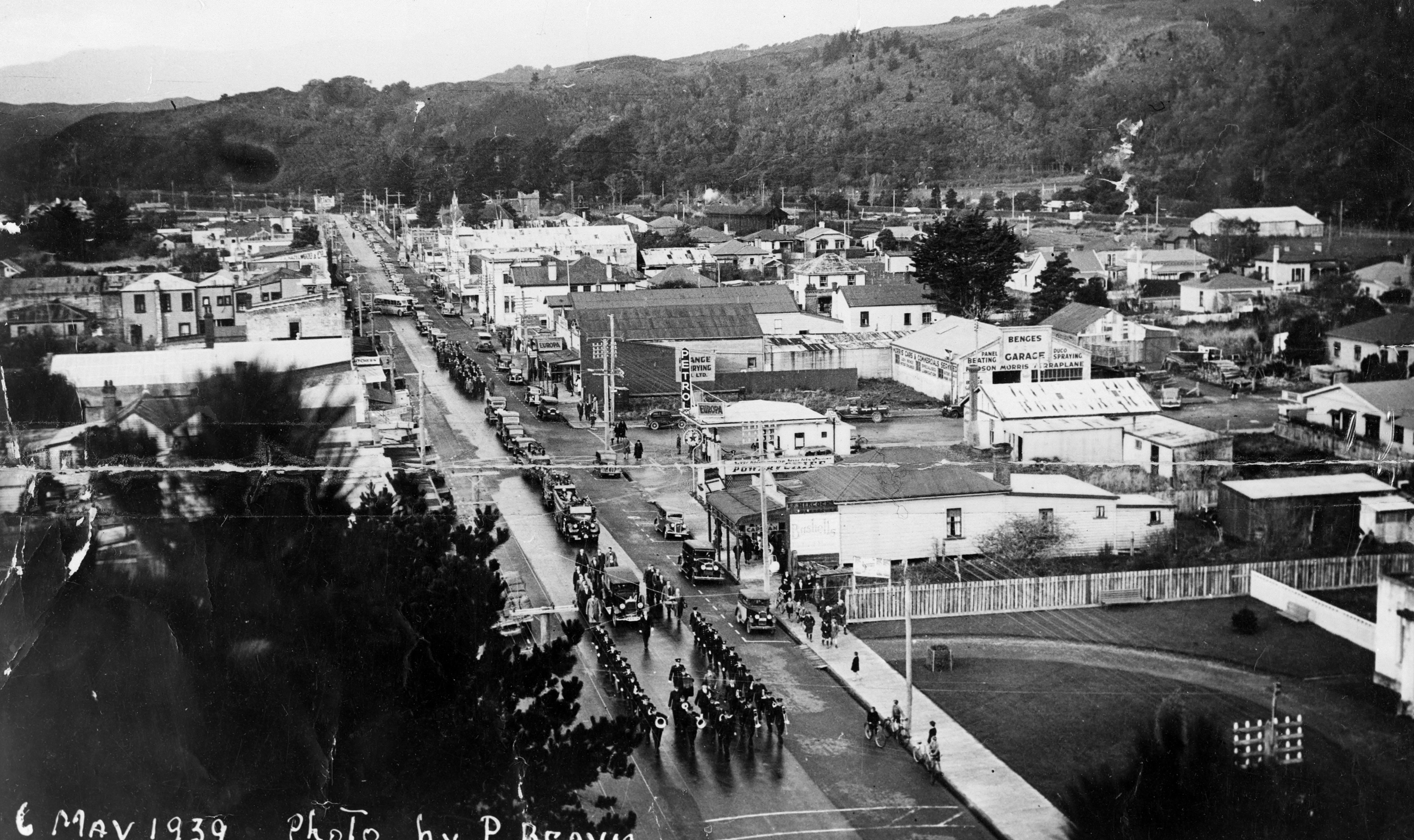
Funeral procession for Mayor Peter Robertson along Main Street in 1939

Local government in Upper Hutt commenced with the formation of a Roads Board, which was subsequently incorporated into the Hutt County Council when that body was established in 1876. The road board evolved into a dependent county town board within the County Council's jurisdiction. After a change in local government legislation, the Upper Hutt Town Board was proclaimed in 1908. In 1965, Upper Hutt qualified as a city, and this status was officially conferred in the following year, with Upper Hutt becoming a city council. In 1973, the Hutt County Council, Rimutaka, and parts of Heretaunga Ridings were amalgamated with Upper Hutt, which thus became the second largest council by area (after Dunedin City Council). Further amalgamation happened in 1989, when Heretaunga/Pinehaven District Community Council was incorporated into Upper Hutt.

The seventh and last chairman of the town board, Angus McCurdy, was elected as the first mayor of the Upper Hutt Borough Council, which was formed in 1926. Peter Robertson was chairman during the years of World War I, and mayor from 1927 to 1931, and again in 1938 until his death in 1939. He died from injuries received in a car crash, colliding with the car of the son of Councillor James Blewman. The resulting by-election was won by Blewman, who beat John Purvis by a majority of 193 votes.

Doris Nicholson was mayor from 1971 to 1977. She was the first woman to hold the mayoralty. She was succeeded by Rex Kirton, who was mayor for 24 years until 2001 and by the time of his retirement from the role, he was New Zealand's longest-serving mayor at that time. He was succeeded by one-term councillor Wayne Guppy, who was elected with a 6,000 vote majority and who held the mayoralty until 2025. In 2025, Peri Zee defeated Guppy, becoming the second female mayor of Upper Hutt.

Unusual for a city in New Zealand, none of the chairmen or mayors of Upper Hutt has been a Member of Parliament.

Until 2004, First Past the Post (FPP) was the electoral system used for New Zealand local elections (with few historic exceptions) including in Upper Hutt. The option of using the Single transferable vote voting system was introduced in 2004, but Upper Hutt continues to use FPP.

== Chairmen and mayors ==
=== Upper Hutt Town Board Chairmen ===
The Upper Hutt Town Board had eight chairmen between 1908 and 1926.

	Name	Term
a	George Isaac Benge	1908–1910
b	Job Harrison	1910–1912
c	R. Herbert Webb	1912–1914
d	Peter Robertson	1914–1918
e	George Campbell	1918–1920
f	William Greig	1920–1924
g	Angus McCurdy	1924–1926

=== Upper Hutt Borough Council ===
The Upper Hutt Borough Council had seven mayors between 1926 and 1966.

	Name	Term
1	Angus McCurdy	1926–1927
2	Peter Robertson	1927–1931
(1)	Angus McCurdy	1931–1938
(2)	Peter Robertson	1938–1939
3	James Blewman	1939–1947
4	Ed Nicolaus	1947–1950
5	George Williams	1950–1953
6	Dick Slacke	1953–1959
7	Percy Kinsman	1959–1966

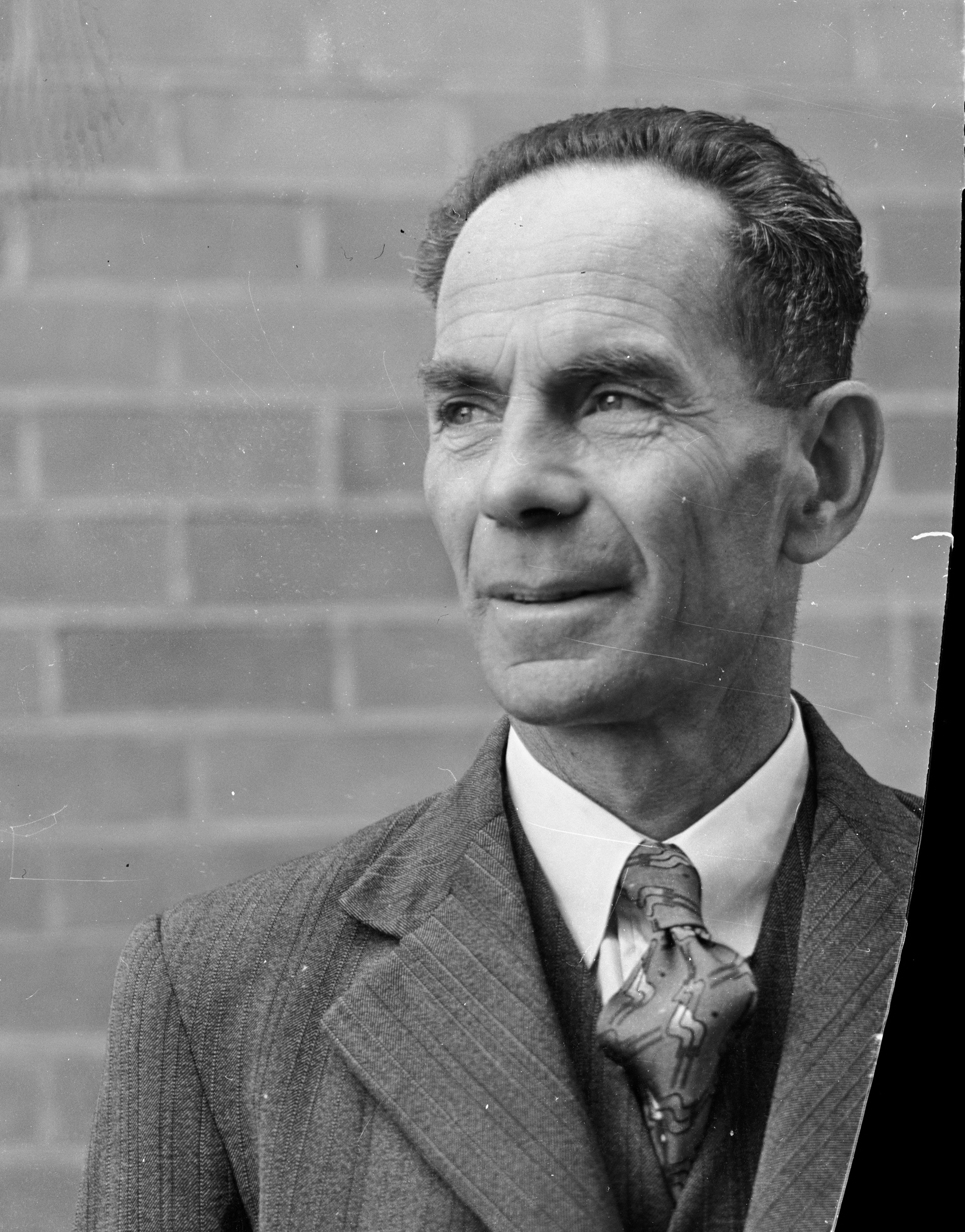
Mayor George Williams in 1950

=== Upper Hutt City Council ===
The Upper Hutt City Council has had an additional five mayors since its formation in 1966. The last mayor of the borough council was also the first mayor of the city council.

	Name	Term
(7)	Percy Kinsman	1966–1968
8	George Thomas	1968–1970
9	Doris Nicholson	1970–1977
10	Rex Kirton	1977–2001
11	Wayne Guppy	2001–2025
12	Peri Zee	2025–present

=== List of deputy mayors ===
As of 2025, three deputy mayors have also become mayors. George Williams became deputy mayor in 1947 to Ed Nicolaus until 1950, where Williams succeeded Nicolaus as mayor. Doris Nicholson served as deputy mayor from the years 1965 to 1970, becoming mayor after the death of mayor George Thomas, where she served from 1970 to 1977. James Blewman was elected mayor from deputy mayor after the death of his mayor Peter Robertson.

==== Upper Hutt Borough Council ====
The Upper Hutt Borough Council had 16 deputy mayors between 1926 and 1966.

	Name	Term	Mayor
1	William Greig	1926–1931	McCurdy
1	William Greig	1926–1931	Robertson
2	James Blewman	1931–1933	McCurdy
3	F.P. Keys	1933–1938	McCurdy
(2)	James Blewman	1938–1939	Robertson
4	C.A. Rendale	1939–1944	Blewman
5	K.S. Geange	1944–1947	Blewman
6	George Williams	1947–1950	Nicolaus
7	R.R. Sainsbury	1950	Nicolaus
8	John 'Scotty' Purvis	1950–1953	Williams
9	George Chapman	1953–1955	Slacke
(3)	F.P. Keys	1955	Slacke
10	J.B. Buchanan	1955–1957	Slacke
11	W.C. Smith	1957–1959	Slacke
12	Cyril Gibbs	1959–1960	Kinsman
13	R.T. Craig	1960–1961	Kinsman
14	J.R. Scott	1961–1962	Kinsman
15	Bill Downs	1962–1965	Kinsman
16	Doris Nicholson	1965–1966	Kinsman

==== Upper Hutt City Council ====
The Upper Hutt City Council has had an additional 11 deputy mayors since its formation in 1966. The last deputy mayor of the borough council was also the first deputy mayor of the city council.

	Name	Term	Mayor
(16)	Doris Nicholson	1966–1970	Kinsman
(16)	Doris Nicholson	1966–1970	Thomas
17	Lionel Jones	1970–1974	Nicholson
18	Stuart Macaskill	1974–1980	Nicholson Kirton
19	Doug Ormrod	1980–1992	Kirton
20	Hilda Billington	1992–1995	Kirton
21	Patricia Christianson	1995–1998	Kirton
22	Nicola Meek	1998–2001	Kirton
23	Shirley Harris	2001–2007	Guppy
24	Peter McCardle	2007–2013	Guppy
25	John Gwilliam	2013–2019	Guppy
26	Hellen Swales	2019–2025	Guppy
27	Corey White	2025–present	Zee
