= Upper Hutt City Council =

Territorial authority of New Zealand

Upper Hutt City Council Te Kaunihera o Te Awa Kairangi ki Uta

Type
- Type: City council of Upper Hutt
- Term limits: None

Leadership
- Mayor: Peri Zee
- Deputy Mayor: Corey White
- Chief Executive: Geoff Swainson

Structure
- Seats: 11 (Note: One mayor, 10 councillors)
- Political groups: Independent (11)
- Length of term: 3 years

Elections
- Voting system: FPP
- Last election: 11 October 2025
- Next election: 2028

Meeting place
- Upper Hutt Civic Centre, 838–842 Fergusson Drive

Website
- www.upperhutt.govt.nz

The Upper Hutt City Council (Māori: Te Kaunihera o Te Awa Kairangi ki Uta) is the territorial authority for the city of Upper Hutt, New Zealand, and its surrounding areas. It serves as the city's local government alongside Greater Wellington Regional Council as its regional council.

A borough council for the area had initially been formed in 1926, which went on to be promoted to a city council in 1966. Following the 1989 reforms to local government, this city council was dissolved and the present council established.

The council is made up of a mayor elected and 10 councillors elected at-large. They are elected using a first past the post system in triennial elections, with the most recent election being held in 2025.

The current mayor is Peri Zee.

== History ==
Upper Hutt was originally administered by the Hutt County Council, which was constituted in 1877. The Upper Hutt Town Board was proclaimed on 24 April 1908, consisting of 7 elected commissioners. In 1926, the town board was replaced by a borough council. Angus McCurdy, a former town clerk and town board commissioner, was elected as the first mayor of Upper Hutt Borough Council.

Following the Second World War, the population of Upper Hutt underwent a major boom and in late 1965 the Government Statistician informed the borough council that they had reached the population prerequisite to gain city status. On 28 May 1966, Upper Hutt was proclaimed to be a city by Governor-general Sir Bernard Fergusson.

Later in 1966, the city council applied to the New Zealand Geographic Board to change the name of the city to Trentham, but withdrew their application following an opinion poll indicating that residents were in favour of retaining the name Upper Hutt for the city. A name change had also been considered by the then borough council in 1940 to distinguish itself from Hutt City Council, and in the 2000s there was another short-lived campaign to change the city's name to Trentham for the same reason.

On 1 April 1973, the Rimutaka Riding of Hutt County was added to the city. When the Hutt County Council was abolished on 1 November 1988, the city took over administration of the Heretaunga/Pinehaven ward, which was incorporated into the city with the local government reforms on 1 November 1989 when the Heretaunga/Pinehaven Community Council was abolished.

In November 2023, the council voted by six to five to introduce a Māori ward for the 2025 and 2028 elections. However, following a change in legislation regarding Māori wards, the council voted in August 2024 to rescind this decision. It thus avoided a requirement to hold a referendum on retaining the ward alongside the 2025 election.

== Composition ==
The elected mayor and councillors provide governance for the city by setting the strategic direction and making decisions on policies, plans and budgets for the council, representing the city's interests, ensuring accountability and transparency, and employing the Chief Executive.

The Chief Executive is in charge of the providing advice to the council and implementing their decisions, administration of the council and employing all other council staff to achieve its strategic priorities.

=== Current councillors ===
The present council was elected in the 2025 local elections, in which Peri Zee unseated incumbent mayor of 24 years Wayne Guppy, who had been seeking a ninth term in office. Zee is the second female mayor for Upper Hutt, following Doris Nicholson who had been mayor from 1970-1977. Newly elected councillor Gurpreet Dhillon is the first Upper Hutt councillor to be of South Asian and Indian origin.

Upper Hutt City Council, 2025–2028
Position	Name	Affiliation
Mayor	Peri Zee	None
Deputy mayor	Corey White	Independent
Councillor	Angela McLeod	None
Councillor	Bill Hammond	Independent
Councillor	Daniel Welch	Backing the Future of Upper Hutt
Councillor	Dave Wheeler	None
Councillor	Emma Holderness	Independent
Councillor	Gurpreet Dhillon	None
Councillor	Hellen Swales	The voice you deserve
Councillor	Matt Carey	Independent
Councillor	Tracey Ultra	Independent

== Civic symbols ==
=== Coat of arms ===
Upper Hutt City was granted a coat of arms by the Royal College of Arms in 1978.

Coat of arms of Upper Hutt
Crest On a wreath of the colours in front of a rock a New Zealand falcon (Falco novaeseelandiae) standing on its nest all proper. Escutcheon Argent a fess wavy azure between in chief two New Zealand pigeons (Hemiphaga novaeseelandiae) respectant and in base a tōtara tree (Podocarpus totara) couped proper. Motto Nihil altius pulchriusue ("Nothing higher nor more beautiful") Symbolism The wavy blue bar in the centre of the shield ("fess wavy azure") represents the Hutt River. The kārearea and kererū represent early bird life in the Upper Hutt Valley, while the tōtara represents the valley's original vegetation.

=== Badge ===
The College of Arms also granted the council a badge, consisting of a gold chain encircling a New Zealand fantail, tail erect and expanded, perched on a twig. The council uses the badge in less formal contexts than the coat of arms.

=== Flag ===
Flag of Upper Hutt

With the consent of the New Zealand Herald Extraordinary, the council adopted a flag in 1982. The flag consists of the shield of the city's coat of arms over a gold cross and a maroon field (the city's colours).

== Notable council members ==
- Harry Kent – Olympic cyclist, elected to council in the 1977 local elections and served for 9 years.
- Peter McCardle – Member of Parliament from 1990 to 1999, councillor from 2001 to 2013
- Gregor W. Yeates – soil zoologist and ecologist, councillor from 1973 to 1977

== See also ==
- Territorial authorities bordering Upper Hutt City Council:
  - Hutt City Council
  - Porirua City Council
  - Kāpiti Coast District Council
  - South Wairarapa District Council
- Greater Wellington Regional Council – the regional council covering Upper Hutt
