= Hull's Creek =

River in New Zealand

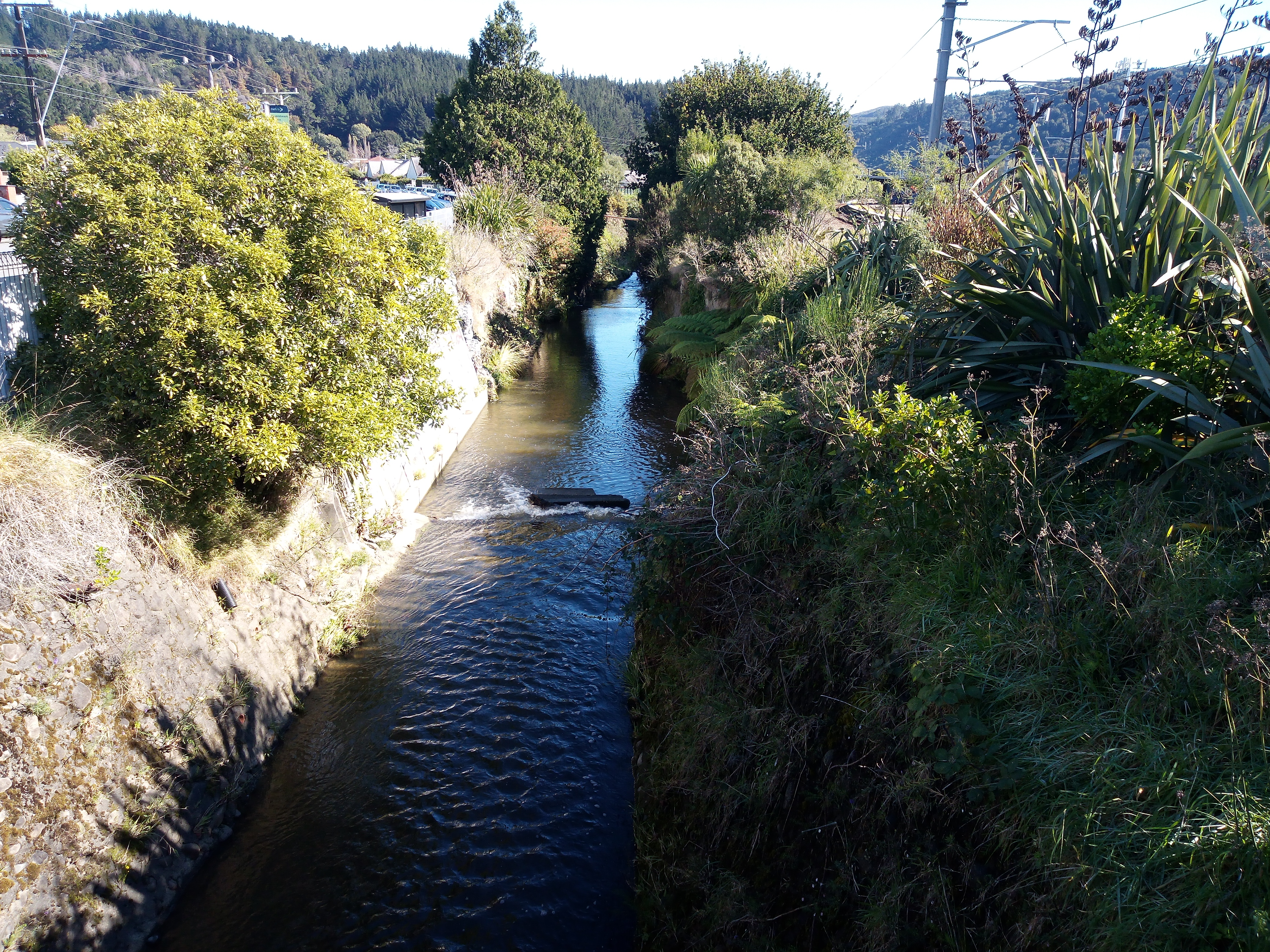
- Hull's Creek from the Silverstream station bridge
- Route of Hull's Creek
- Mouth of Hull's Creek Hull's Creek (North Island)

Location
- Country: New Zealand
- Island: North Island
- Region: Wellington
- District: Upper Hutt

Physical characteristics
- Source: Confluence of Pinehaven Stream and Heretaunga Drain
  - coordinates: 41.14734°S 175.01205°E
- Mouth: Te Awa Kairangi / Hutt River
  - coordinates: 41°08′54″S 174°59′38″E
- Length: 5.5 km (3.4 mi)
- Basin size: 1,658 ha (4,100 acres)

Basin features
- Progression: Hull's Creek → Te Awa Kairangi / Hutt River → Wellington Harbour → Cook Strait → Pacific Ocean
- Cities: Silverstream
- Tributaries
  - left: Tip Stream
- Bridges: Silverstream station bridge, Field Street bridge, Silverstream Bridge (Eastern Hutt Road), Hutt River Trail bridge

Hull's Creek is a small watercourse in Upper Hutt, in the North Island of New Zealand. The creek and its tributaries the western side of the Hutt Valley, including the suburbs of Silverstream, Pinehaven, Trentham and Wallaceville. It flows into the Hutt River just south of the Silverstream bridge.

== Geography ==
Hulls Creek flows through an area of low-lying hills, farmland and urban areas of Upper Hutt, including Silverstream. Much of the lower sections in urban areas have been straightened and concrete lined, or piped underground.

== Ecology ==
Fish species present in Hull's Creek include the New Zealand longfin eel, inanga, Banded kōkopu, Giant kōkopu, and three species of bully.

Since 2003 the Silverstream Care Group have worked to restore the ecology of the creek, removing invasive trees and weeds, planting native trees, and constructing a fish pass to allow native fish to access the creek's upper reaches.
