= List of historic places in Upper Hutt =

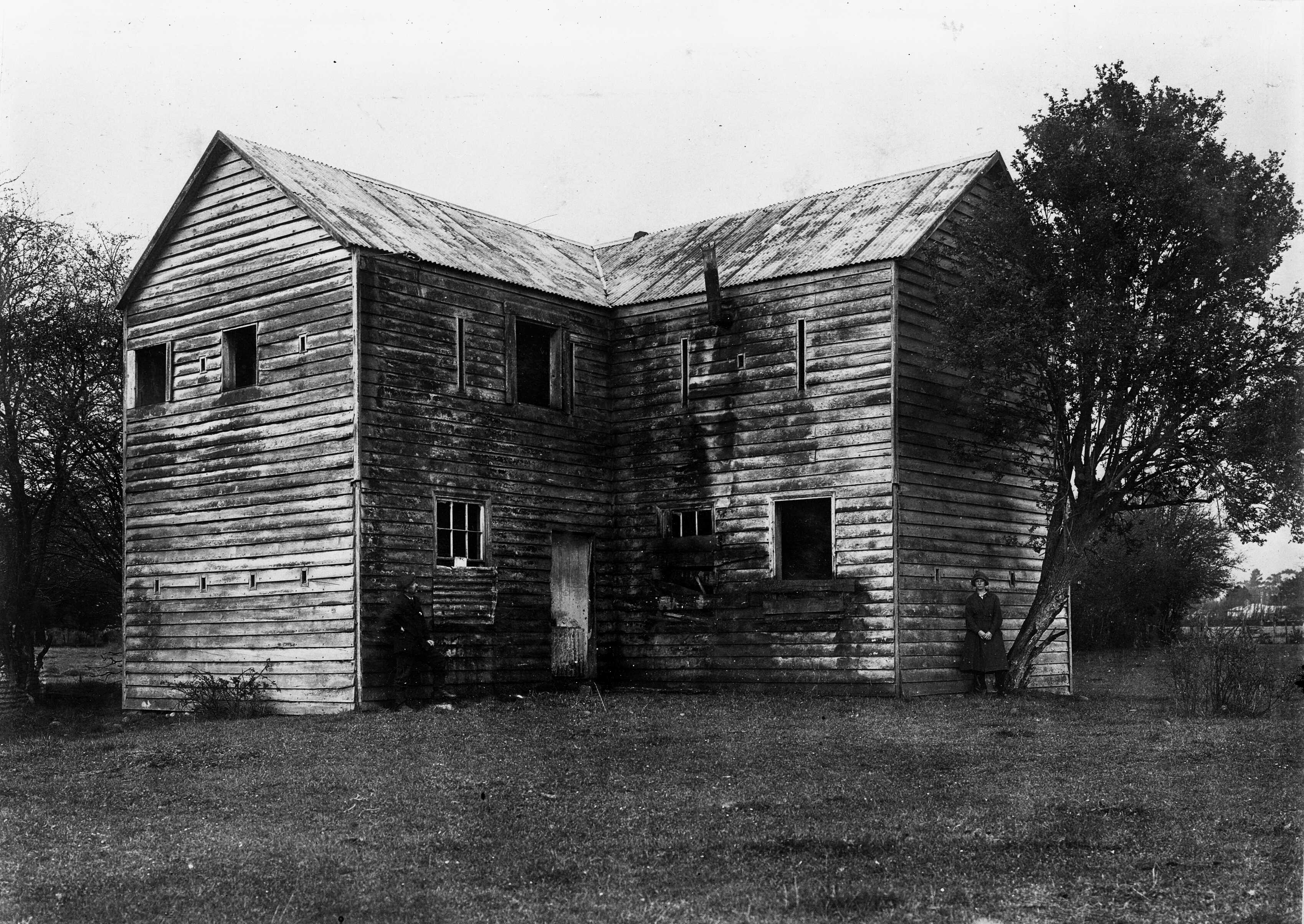
The Upper Hutt Blockhouse (Former), a Category 1 historic place in Upper Hutt

Upper Hutt is a city and territorial authority of New Zealand located within the Wellington Region, on the southern coast of the North Island. Initially inhabited by the Māori, it was acquired by British settlers as part of the 1839 Port Nicholson Purchase Deed. Settlers moved into the valley in the late 1840s, with a small town forming in the area by the 1850s. Initially a small farming community, it was connected to Wellington by the Wairarapa Line in the mid-1870s. Incorporated as a city in 1966, it now functions as a bedroom community of Wellington.

Heritage New Zealand classification of sites on the New Zealand Heritage List / Rārangi Kōrero, in accordance with the Heritage New Zealand Pouhere Taonga Act 2014, distinguishes between Category 1 ("places of special or outstanding historical or cultural significance") and Category 2 ("places of historic or cultural significance"). Sites important to Māori communities are given special classifications, although none of these sites are located within Upper Hutt. Locales containing a number of related significant places are listed as historic areas. Twelve historic sites within Upper Hutt are included on the Heritage List, including four Category 1 sites, seven Category 2 sites, and one historic area. The historic area, the Remutaka Incline Rail Trail, crosses into part of neighbouring South Wairarapa District.

== Sites ==
List of historic places in Upper Hutt
| Name | Classification | Location | Constructed | Registered | List number | Notes | Image | Ref. |
|---|---|---|---|---|---|---|---|---|
| Upper Hutt Blockhouse (former) | Category 1 | Blockhouse Lane, Trentham | 1860 | 1986 | 207 | Two-storey blockhouse constructed in 1860 in response to settler fears of Māori attacks. It was initially occupied by a local battalion of the Wellington Militia, but never saw military action, and variously served as a police office, courthouse, jail, private residence, and scouting centre. It is one of the last remaining defensive structures in New Zealand. | The Upper Hutt Blockhouse, an L-shaped black two-storey building | |
| St John's Church (Anglican) | Category 2 | Moonshine Road and Fergusson Drive, Trentham | 1863 | 1983 | 1330 | Consecrated by Bishop Charles Abraham in 1863, it is one of the oldest Anglican churches in the Wellington region. Frederick de Jersey Clere expanded the church structure significantly in 1884 and 1914, adding a chancel and sanctuary. His son made further expansions in 1955. | A small church with a graveyard | |
| House | Category 2 | 1 Chatsworth Road, Silverstream | 1939–1940 | 1985 | 4146 | An Arts and Crafts-style house designed by James Chapman-Taylor and built by his son Rex. The original owners sold the house in 1953, and a sunroom was added in 1964. | | |
| House | Category 2 | 24A Chatsworth Road, Silverstream | 1908 | 1985 | 4148 | One of the first Arts and Crafts-style house designed by James Chapman-Taylor in Silverstream. Features furniture built by Chapman-Taylor, including a corner brick fireplace. A two-storey brick addition was added in the 1930s. | | |
| Restormel | Category 2 | 53 Chatsworth Road, Silverstream | 1928 | 1985 | 4149 | An Arts and Crafts-style house designed by James Chapman-Taylor, and built alongside his son Rex. The house is primarily brick, with Crittall windows and a tile roof. Mostly one-storey, although it has two attic rooms. The interior features exposed timber beams. | | |
| Tweed House | Category 1 | 5 Brentwood Street, Trentham | 1930 | 1986 | 4152 | An Arts and Crafts-style house designed by James Chapman-Taylor and built from 1929 to 1930. It is a two-storey reinforced concrete house, although plaster and jarrah timber were also used heavily. It now serves as a bed and breakfast named Brentwood Manor. | A two-storey concrete house with a large yard | |
| Trentham Military Camp Clocktower Building (library) | Category 2 | Anzac Drive, Trentham | 1916 | 1985 | 4150 | One of the first structures built for the Trentham Military Camp. Formerly a rifle range, the area became a mobilisation camp during the First World War. Official records claim the clocktower building was erected in 1916 as an Anglican church, although it was likely used as a cinema. It was used by a sailmaker after the war, before conversion into a lecture hall and sleeping quarters after the war. It is now in use as a library. | | |
| Woodhill | Category 1 | 71 Chatsworth Road, Silverstream | 1933 | 1986 | 4153 | An Arts and Crafts-style house designed by James Chapman-Taylor and constructed from 1932 to 1933. It is fashioned from reinforced concrete finished with plaster, topped by a tile roof. | | |
| Golder's House | Category 2 | 707 Fergusson Drive, Upper Hutt | 1876–1877 | 1991 | 2891 | A historic cottage constructed by road builder John Golder from 1876 to 1877. Various additions were added over the following decades as his family grew. The Upper Hutt City Council acquired the structure from the Golder family in 1985, before its conversion to a house museum two years later. The structure features various outbuildings, including a foodstore also listed as a historic place. | An old cottage with a red roof | |
| Wallaceville Animal Research Centre Veterinary Laboratory (former) | Category 1 | 70 Ward Street, Wallaceville | 1904 | 1985 | 3573 | A veterinary centre constructed for the Department of Agriculture by John Campbell, initially named Wallaceville Veterinary Laboratory. It served as the main veterinary research centre in New Zealand and as the headquarter of the Department of Agriculture's veterinary division. It is still in use as an animal health laboratory by AgResearch. | | |
| Golder's House Food Store | Category 2 | 707 Fergusson Drive, Upper Hutt | 1880 | 1991 | 5402 | A small timber foodstore outbuilding constructed adjacent to the Golder Cottage in the 1880s. It features a corrugated iron gable roof and an exterior meat safe. It is now owned and managed by the Golder's Homestead Museum Society. | | |
| Remutaka Incline Rail Trail | Historic area | Kaitoke, Upper Hutt to Cross Creek, South Wairarapa | 1870s | 2002 | 7511 | A 16 km (10 mi) rail trail, crossing between Upper Hutt and into the adjacent territorial authority of South Wairarapa. An extremely steep portion known as the Remutaka Incline was used by trains from 1878 to 1955, until it was abandoned in favor of the Remutaka Tunnel. Portions of the route are administered by the Wellington Regional Council and used as a logging road. | A long trail through a grassy hilly terrain | |
