= Silverstream =

Suburb of Upper Hutt City, New Zealand

Coordinates: 41°08′58″S 175°00′48″E

- Suburb
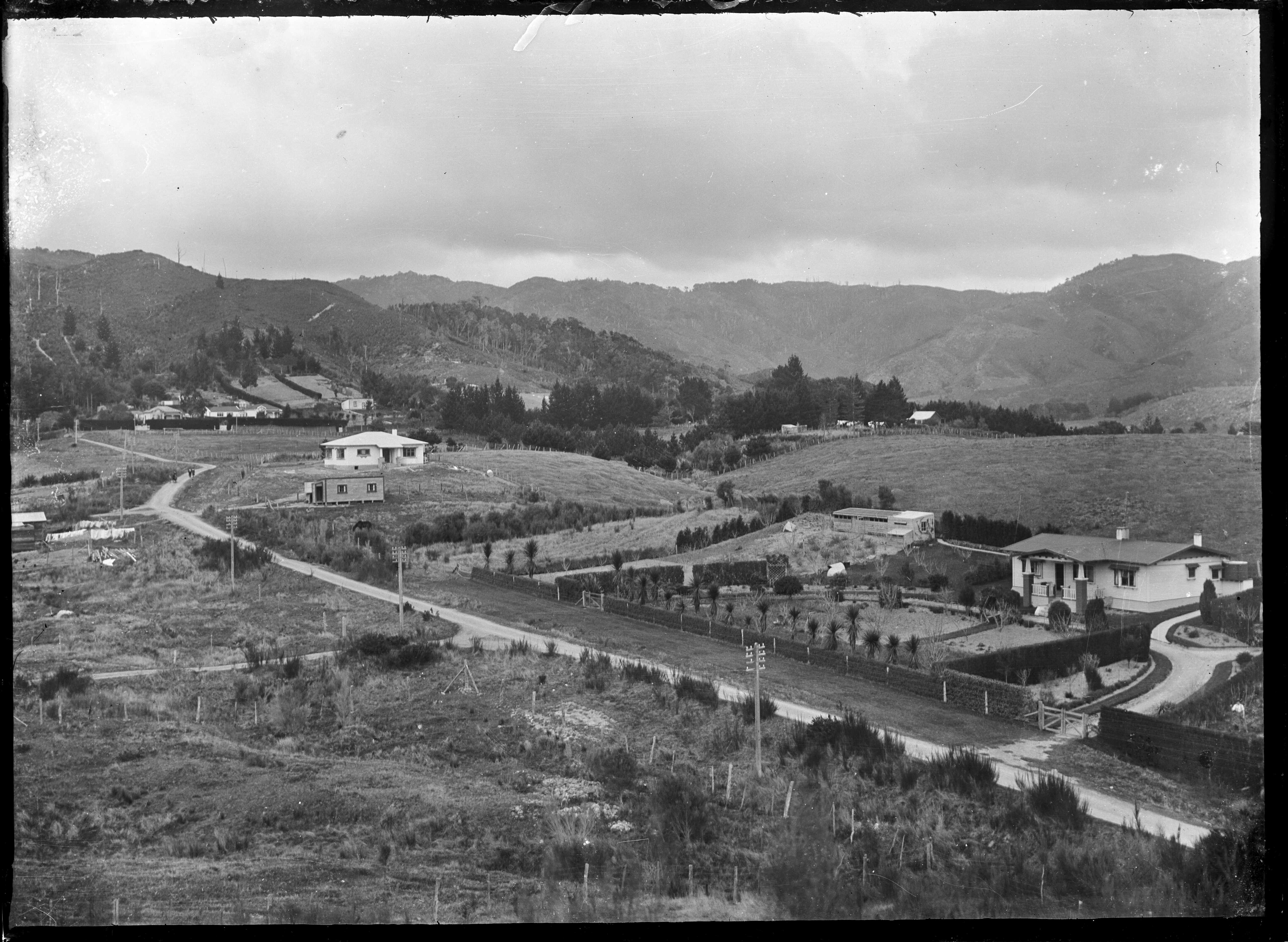
- Glocester Street in Silverstream in 1922
- Interactive map of Silverstream
- Country: New Zealand
- City: Upper Hutt
- Local authority: Upper Hutt City Council

Area
  - Land: 264 ha (650 acres)

Population (June 2025)
  - Total: 3,590
  - Density: 1,360/km^{2} (3,520/sq mi)
- Postcode: 5019

| | | Heretaunga |
| Haywards | Silverstream | Trentham |
| Stokes Valley | | Pinehaven |

Silverstream is a suburb of Upper Hutt in New Zealand, just under 7 km (4.3 mi) south-west of the Upper Hutt CBD. It is in the lower (southern) part of the North Island of New Zealand at the southern end of Upper Hutt, close to the Taitā Gorge, which separates Upper Hutt from Lower Hutt. The area is sited at the mouth of a small valley formed by the Wellington Region's tectonic activity and, in part, by Hull's Creek, which discharges into the Hutt River.

== Demographics ==
Silverstream statistical area covers 2.64 km^{2} (1.02 sq mi). It had an estimated population of 3,590 as of June 2025, with a population density of 1,360 people per km^{2}.

Historical population
| Year | Pop. | ±% p.a. |
|---|---|---|
| 2006 | 3,321 | — |
| 2013 | 3,264 | −0.25% |
| 2018 | 3,531 | +1.58% |
| 2023 | 3,516 | −0.09% |

Silverstream had a population of 3,516 in the 2023 New Zealand census, a decrease of 15 people (−0.4%) since the 2018 census, and an increase of 252 people (7.7%) since the 2013 census. There were 1,761 males, 1,737 females, and 21 people of other genders in 1,257 dwellings. 3.8% of people identified as LGBTIQ+. The median age was 42.3 years (compared with 38.1 years nationally). There were 678 people (19.3%) aged under 15 years, 534 (15.2%) aged 15 to 29, 1,641 (46.7%) aged 30 to 64, and 663 (18.9%) aged 65 or older.

People could identify as more than one ethnicity. The results were 86.9% European (Pākehā); 10.9% Māori; 3.4% Pasifika; 9.3% Asian; 1.1% Middle Eastern, Latin American and African New Zealanders (MELAA); and 2.6% other, which includes people giving their ethnicity as "New Zealander". English was spoken by 97.8%, Māori by 2.0%, Samoan by 0.4%, and other languages by 11.9%. No language could be spoken by 1.8% (e.g. too young to talk). New Zealand Sign Language was known by 0.3%. The percentage of people born overseas was 22.8, compared with 28.8% nationally.

Religious affiliations were 38.5% Christian, 1.0% Hindu, 0.4% Islam, 0.2% Māori religious beliefs, 0.5% Buddhist, 0.3% New Age, and 1.5% other religions. People who answered that they had no religion were 51.9%, and 5.7% of people did not answer the census question.

Of those at least 15 years old, 1,005 (35.4%) people had a bachelor's or higher degree, 1,407 (49.6%) had a post-high school certificate or diploma, and 420 (14.8%) people exclusively held high school qualifications. The median income was $56,600, compared with $41,500 nationally. 693 people (24.4%) earned over $100,000 compared to 12.1% nationally. The employment status of those at least 15 was 1,578 (55.6%) full-time, 351 (12.4%) part-time, and 63 (2.2%) unemployed.

== Transport ==
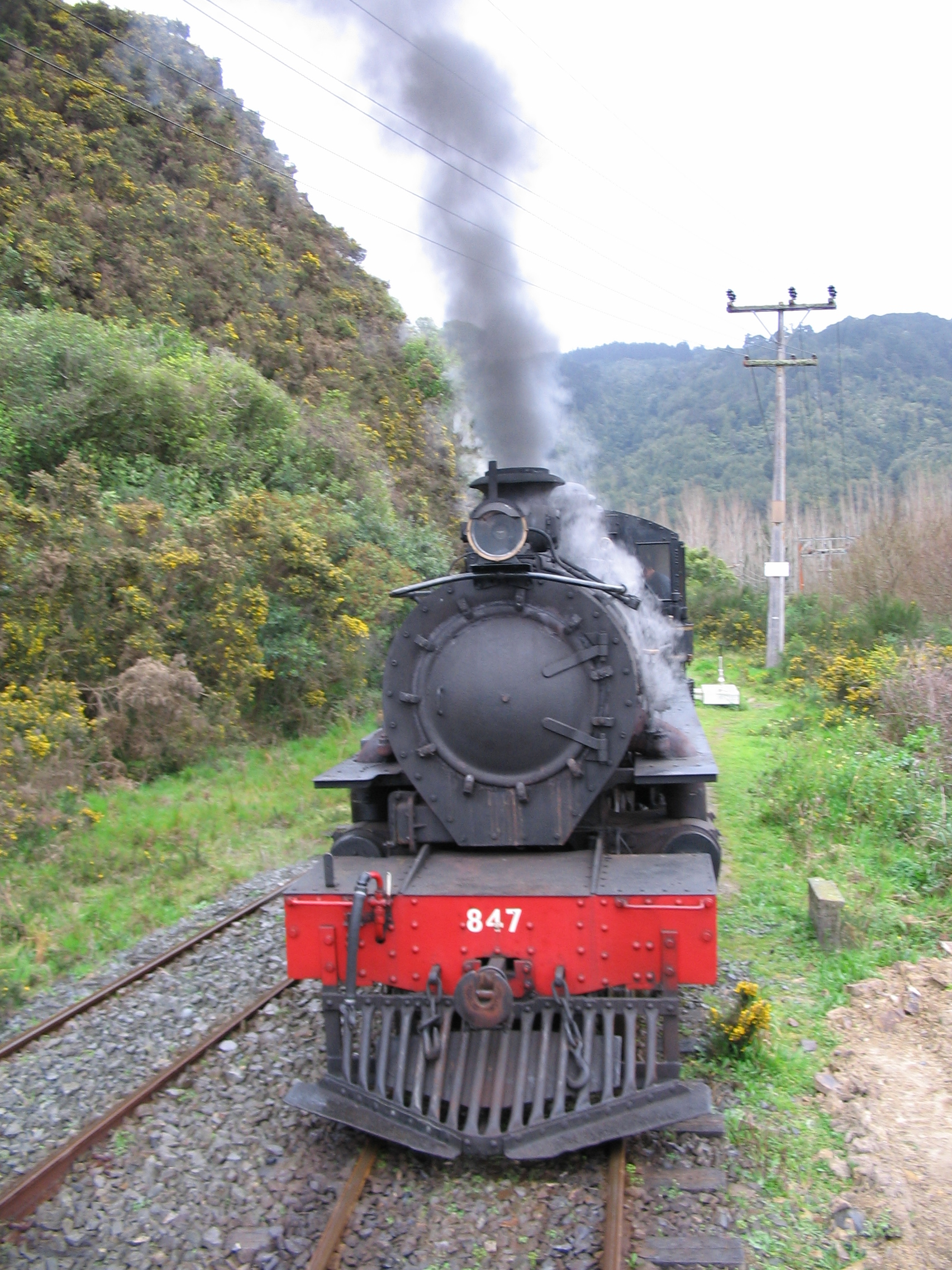
C 847 travelling on the Silver Stream Railway

Silverstream is on the Hutt Valley section of the Wairarapa railway line, operated by Metlink. The area has a station on this line; the Silverstream railway station. A deviation of the Wairarapa line was opened in 1954 original Wairarapa Line in Silverstream over the Hutt River. The original section of the line is now owned by the Silver Stream Railway.

== Education ==
=== Silverstream School ===
Silverstream School is a co-educational state primary school for Year 1 to 6 students, with a roll of 481 as of July 2026. It opened in 1924.

The school has 22 classes, with three separate school syndicates: Ako Iti (Years 1 and 2), Ako Whanake (Years 3 and 4) and Ako Nui (Years 5 and 6). It takes part in ICAS mathematics and English competitions and the Otago Problem Solving challenge, and has its own small choir and orchestra.

Between 2007 and 2010, the school underwent extensive renovations.

The school grounds are sometimes used for events, such as running races and meetings.

=== Saint Patrick's College Silverstream ===
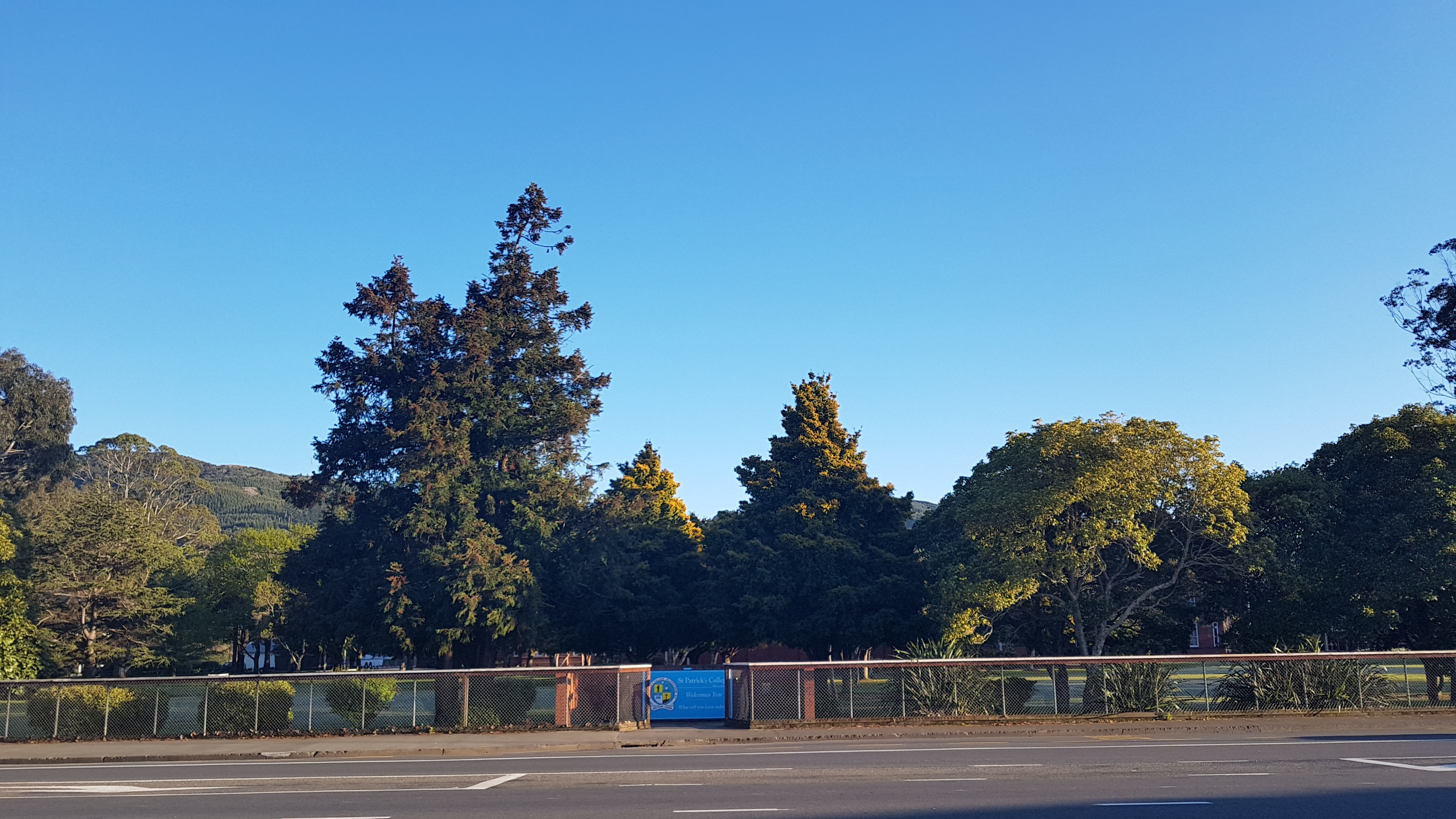
St. Patrick's College

St Patrick's College is a state-integrated Catholic secondary school for Year 9 to 13 boys, with a roll of 750 as of July 2026. It opened in 1931 with a move of the boarding section of St Patrick's College, Wellington.

=== Silverstream Christian School ===
Silverstream Christian School is a co-educational private Christian school, associated with Silverstream Reformed Church, for Year 1 to 13 students, with a roll of 29 as of July 2026.

=== Other education ===
Silverstream is zoned for Fergusson Intermediate and Upper Hutt College.

It also has a kindergarten for children aged 3 to 4.

== Notable people ==
- Beverly Morrison, known as "Beaver", a jazz singer educated at Silverstream School
- Hilary Barry, NZ TV and radio personality was educated at Silverstream School in the 70s.
- Cecily Pickerill, a New Zealand plastic surgeon.
