= 1976 Wellington storm =

Storm in New Zealand

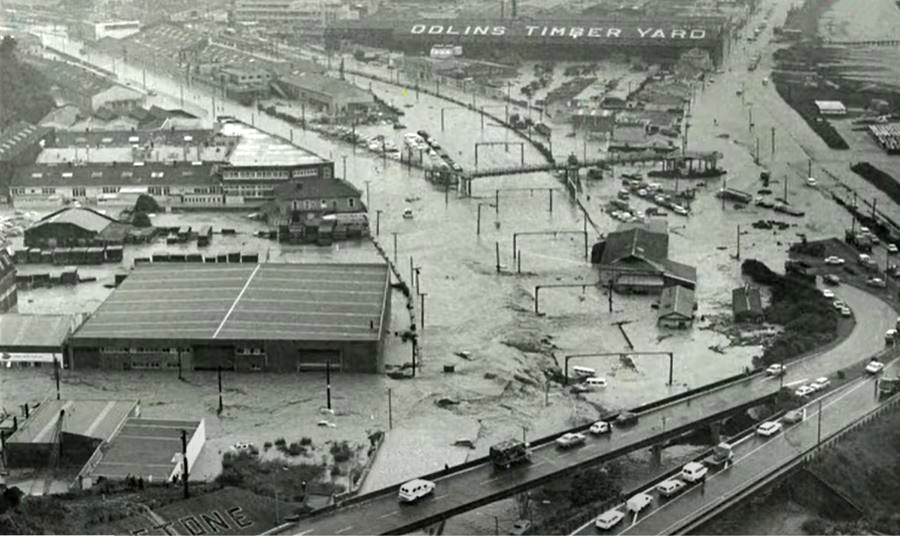
Flooding in Petone around the industrial area near Cornish Street, with the Petone offramp in the foreground.

The 1976 Wellington storm occurred between 20 and 23 December 1976 in the Wellington region of New Zealand. The storm brought extreme rainfall to Wellington city and the Hutt Valley, causing severe flooding, landslips, damage to homes, businesses and infrastructure and the death of one person.

The event was caused by two moist airstreams coming from the north and south, which converged over the Hutt Valley and produced extremely heavy rainfall, mostly in a short period between midnight on 19 December through to the afternoon of 20 December. Heavy rain began falling in the Hutt Valley at about 4 am on 20 December, from Pinehaven to Karori, and continued until about 2 pm in Pinehaven and 4 pm in Wellington city. The rainfall return period was the worst in 50 years, and in some parts of the affected 300 km^{2} (120 sq mi) area was the heaviest in 100 or possibly 500 years. Culverts and watercourses did not have the capacity to handle the volume of rainwater, and slips and mudflows brought debris into stormwater drains which blocked them and further reduced capacity. Hundreds of slips occurred over an area stretching from Haywards through to Belmont, Newlands, Ngaio, Wilton, Karori and Mākara, with the worst-affected areas being Pinehaven and Stokes Valley. The event caused damage estimated at between $19 million and $30 million.

== Wellington ==
In Wellington city, 30 cm (12 in) of water covered Lambton Quay. Ngauranga Gorge and Ngaio Gorge roads were closed due to heavy flooding around Kaiwharawhara and the bottom of the Ngauranga Gorge road, and trains were cancelled due to flooding on the lines. Water one metre (3 ft 3 in) deep covered a 1.6-kilometre-long (1-mile) section of the Hutt Road. The extensive flooding cut Wellington off from the Hutt Valley and the rest of the North Island. Thousands of commuters were stranded in the city, so Mayor Michael Fowler made the town hall available as a refuge for those with nowhere to stay.

Blocked culverts caused flood damage in Karori, Ngaio, Khandallah and Johnsonville. There were numerous slips and mudflows. A three-year-old boy was killed at Crofton Downs when he was buried under a slip that crashed into the building he was in.

There was no Civil Defence declaration of a state of emergency in Wellington, because the mayor believed that emergency services were coping with the situation. Wellington Free Ambulance and the Medical Association both criticised Civil Defence, citing a lack of communication and organisation. Twenty army trucks drove from Linton Camp to assist in the affected area: one convoy of 10 trucks went to Trentham and the other to Wellington. They transported displaced people and moved vehicles thrown around or stranded by the floods. New Zealand Police sent 50 police officers from other towns to provide patrols to guard damaged business premises and houses.

== Hutt Valley ==
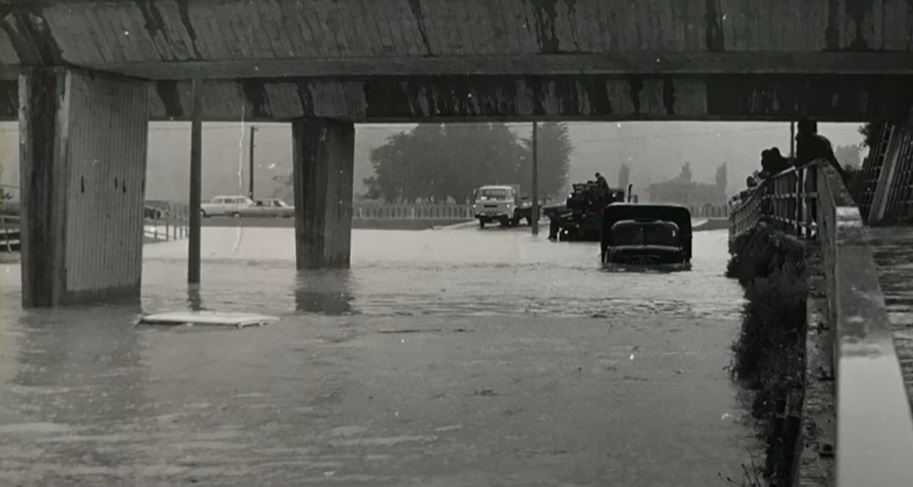
Flooding at the rail underpass, Field Street, Silverstream.

The Hutt River burst its banks at 11 am on 20 December. A Civil Defence state of emergency was declared in Lower Hutt for 24 hours from 3:00 pm on 20 December, and 43 families were evacuated. A second state of emergency was declared in Pinehaven in Upper Hutt at 4:30 pm from 22 December until 12 pm on 23 December. Numerous slips at Pinehaven blocked drains and stream channels and led to flooding and severe damage to some properties. A similar situation developed at Stokes Valley. At 10:30 am on 20 December, the petrol station at the entrance to Stokes Valley was flooded to within 15 centimetres (6 in) of the top of the petrol pumps. Pinehaven and Stokes Valley were declared disaster zones.

Numerous houses in the Hutt Valley were damaged by flooding or mud. Twenty-two families were evacuated from Pinehaven, and at Ngahere Street in Stokes Valley three houses were destroyed when they slipped down a hill. Five residents of Stokes Valley were evacuated by a helicopter from the United States Coast Guard icebreaker Burton Island which happened to be in port at the time. Crew from the ship also helped dig out houses in Stokes Valley after the weather subsided. About 100 people evacuated from their homes were given accommodation at the Epuni Boys Home.

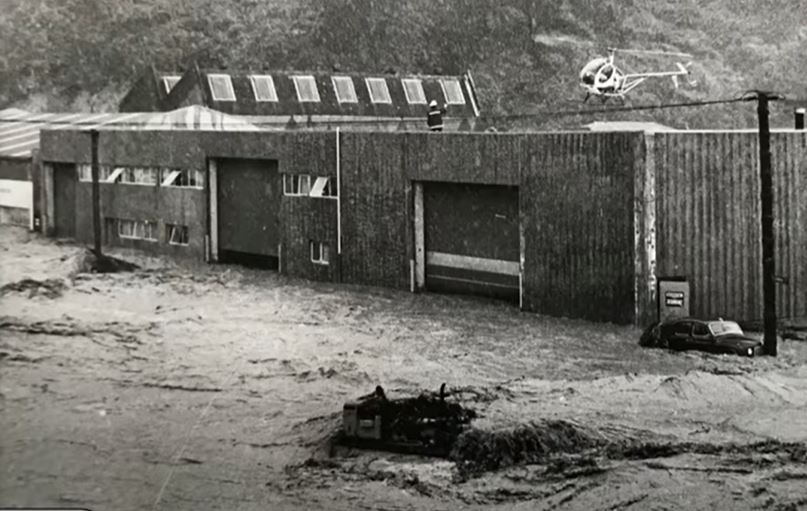
Helicopter rescuing people from a building in Cornish Street, Petone.

Debris from slips blocked the stormwater system in Belmont, which led to flooding. Three houses In Charles Street suffered a metre of flooding, and the road was covered in 30 centimetres (1 ft) of mud and silt. Gully erosion caused a slip that destroyed a house.

Some power poles were swept away in slips and several substations were flooded, but apart from a six-hour power cut in Belmont, there was only minor disruption to the domestic power supply.

At Petone, there was flooding up to 1.5 metres (5 ft) deep in the industrial area around Cornish Street, at the west end of the foreshore near the Korokoro Stream. Workers had to be rescued from rooftops by helicopter. More than 40 people were rescued from one factory roof. Also in Petone, $50,000 worth of medicines were damaged when flood waters broke into the premises of pharmaceutical company Parke-Davis. Hundreds of prescription pills were washed into streets nearby. Parke-Davis staff and the police searched the area and collected four rubbish sacks full of medicines.

== Porirua ==
There was flooding up to 1.5 metres (5 ft) deep around the Linden Park area, which caused damage to several factories there. Other areas in Porirua city and Tawa borough experienced minor flooding.

== Impact ==
Some of the cost of damage was covered by the Earthquake and War Damage Commission, and some was covered by private insurance, but many people faced bills for uninsurable damage or for insurance excesses. A public Flood Relief Fund raised money, and the Government contributed funds as well.

A Wellington Regional Water Board report produced six weeks after the event estimated damage to property and services at $19 million. The report recommended investigations into ways to improve the capacity and flow of waterways in the region. It also recommended that in any new urban development, watercourses should be located in public reserves where they are easier to maintain, rather than located on private properties.

Sources give various reports of the cost of the event. The Insurance Council of New Zealand states that claims paid by the insurance industry cost $6.2 million, the equivalent of $50 million in 2023 if adjusted for inflation. The Earthquake and War Damage Commission estimated that insurance claims resulting from the storm totalled $30 million. Civil Defence states that damage was estimated at about $85 million, and insurance claims totalled over $40 million.

== Gallery ==
Examples of damage caused by the floods and slips

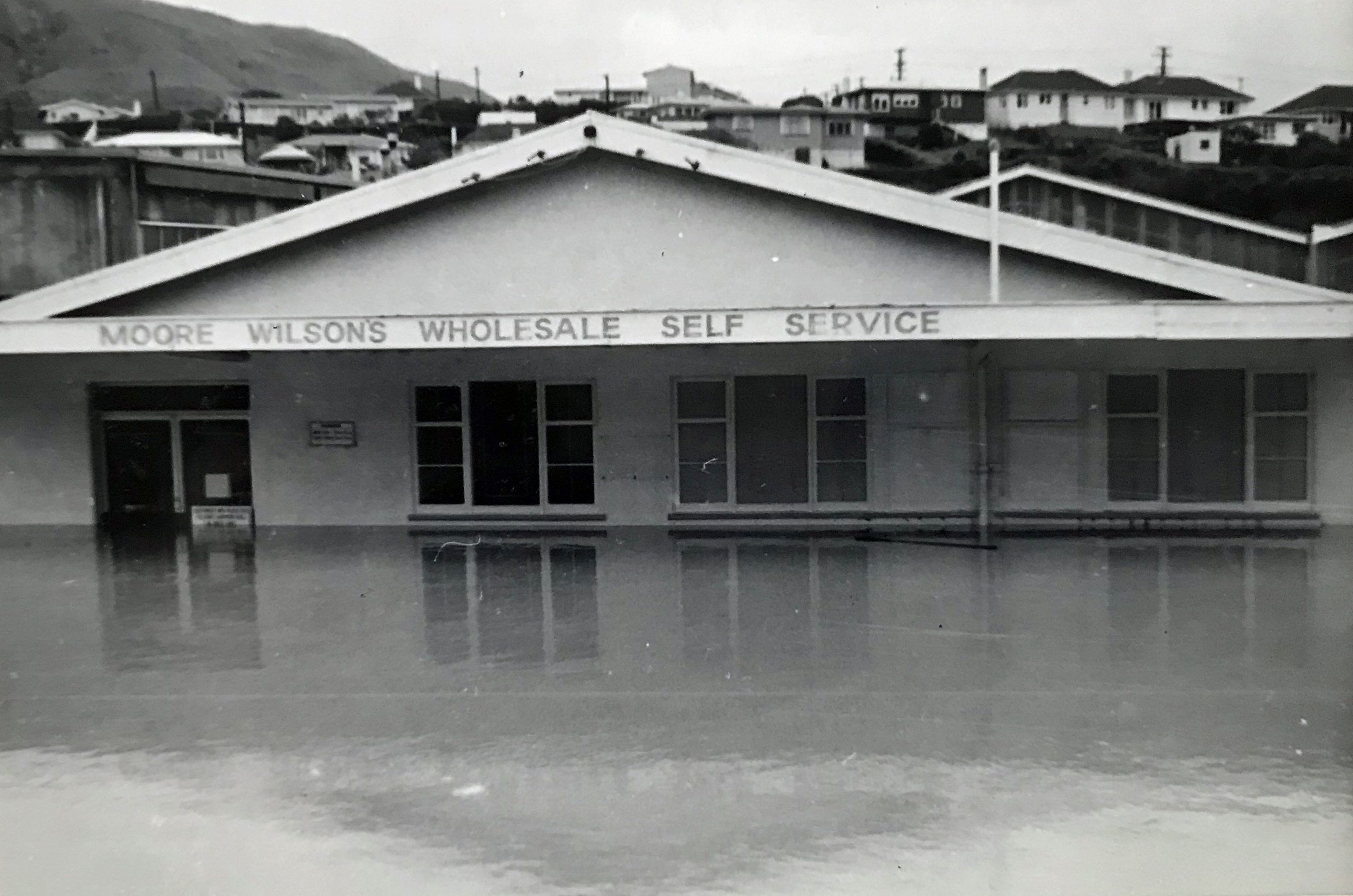
Flooding at Moore Wilsons, Porirua.

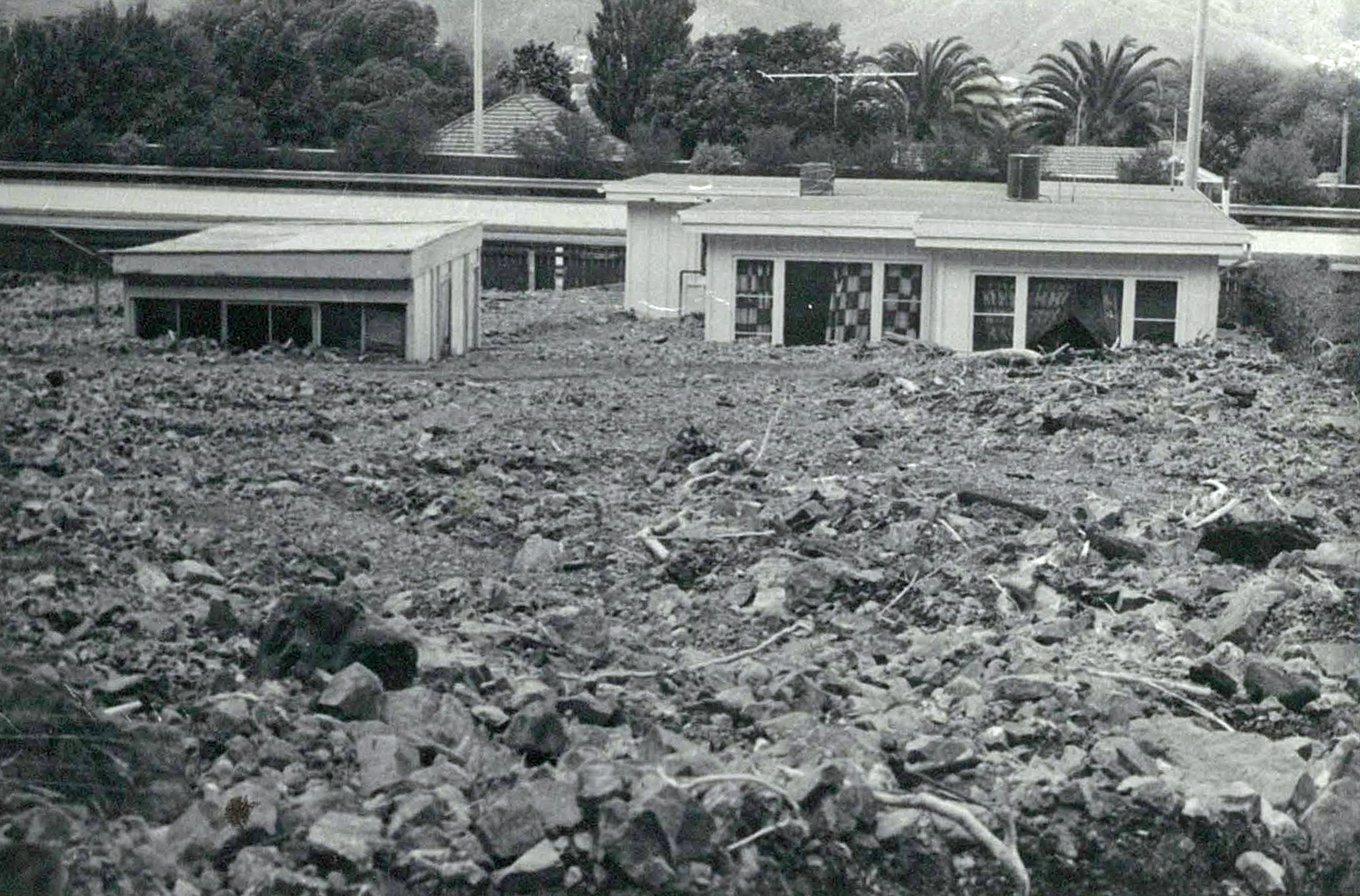
Major Drive, Lower Hutt

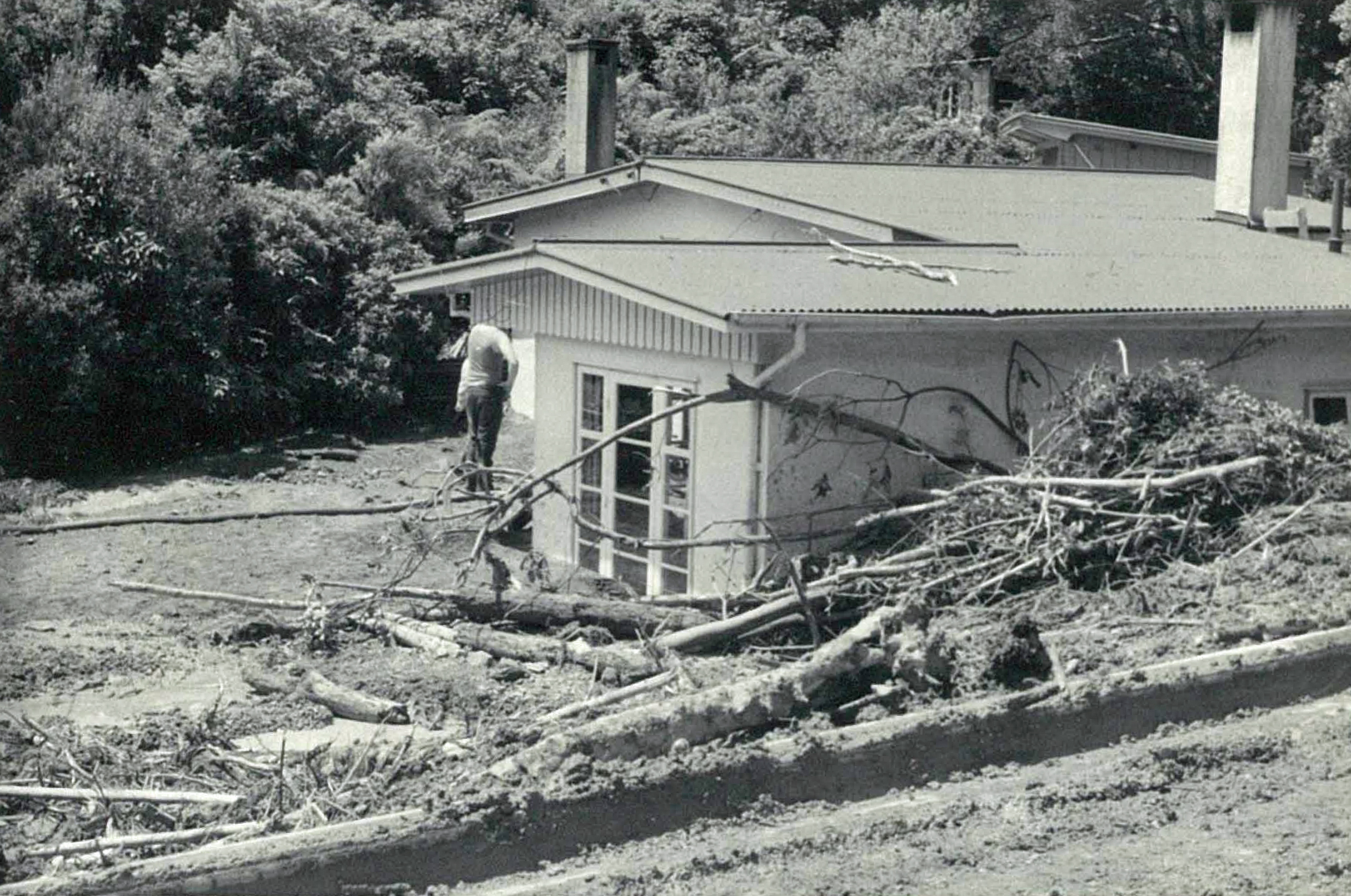
Elmslie Road, Pinehaven

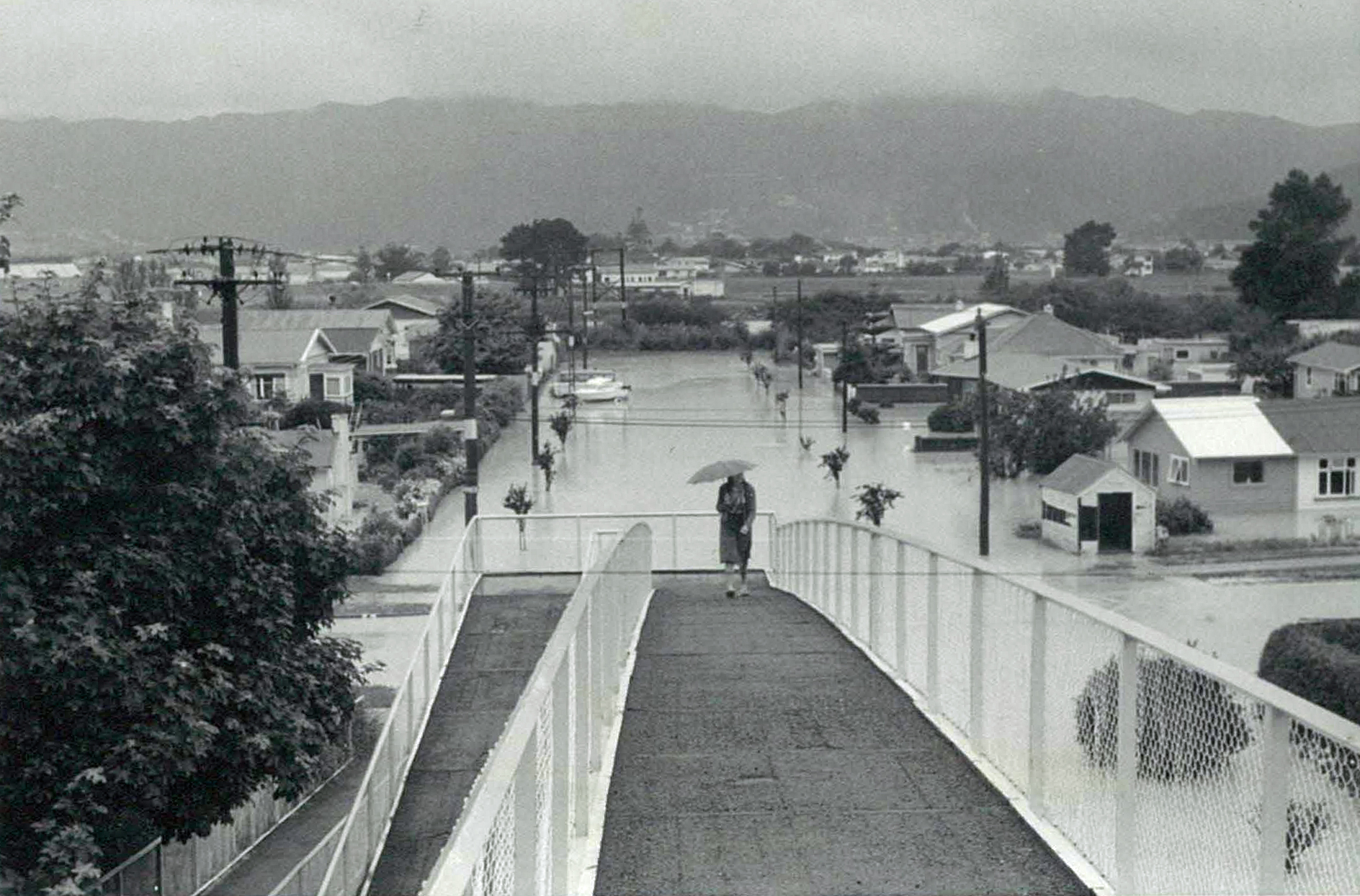
Owen Street, Belmont

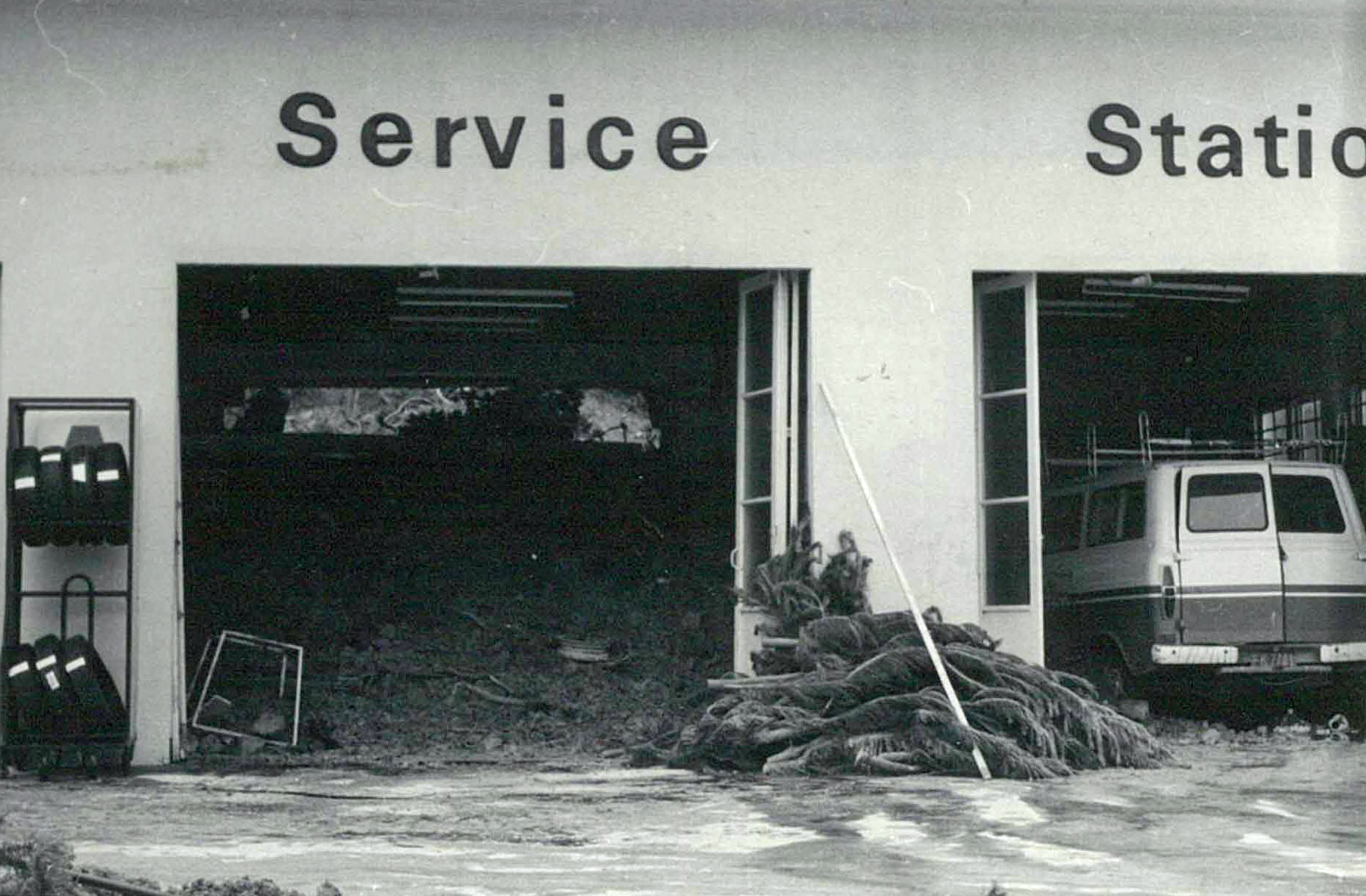
Garage, Eastern Hutt Road. Back wall pushed in by slip.
