= Hopkirk =

Hopkirk is a surname. Notable people with the surname include:

- Cyril Hopkirk, New Zealand veterinary scientist
- Paddy Hopkirk, rally driver
- Peter Hopkirk, British journalist
- Thomas Hopkirk, Scottish botanist and lithographer

== Fictional characters ==
- Marty Hopkirk, a main character of Randall and Hopkirk (Deceased)
