= Heretaunga College =

Location
- Ward Street; Wallaceville; Upper Hutt 5018; New Zealand; 41.129°S 175.055°E

Information
- Type: State co-educational High School
- Motto: Kia Hiwa Ra
- Established: 1954
- Ministry of Education Institution no.: 251
- Principal: John Murdoch
- Years offered: Years 9–13
- Enrolment: 865 (July 2026)
- Socio-economic decile: 6N
- Website: heretaunga.school.nz

Heretaunga College is a state coeducational secondary school located in Upper Hutt, New Zealand. The school has approximately 865 students from Years 9 to 13 (ages 12 to 18).

The college grounds are a large area with primary access via Ward Street (which runs North-West to South-East) and secondary access via Blockhouse Lane and Fortune Lane. The adjacent Blockhouse is a 1860s relic of the New Zealand Wars (although it never saw action), which is currently managed by Heritage New Zealand. The adjacent Fortune Lane was one of the first residential areas in Upper Hutt, but no original buildings remain.

A long-running proposal to merge Heretaunga College with nearby Upper Hutt College and their feeder schools Fergusson Intermediate and Maidstone Intermediate which had led to a moratorium on buildings maintenance collapsed in 2007. The only nearby secondary schools not included in the proposals were St. Patrick's College, Silverstream and Hutt International Boys' School.

== Classes ==
Heretaunga offers a broad range of classes and subjects throughout all year levels. Facilities include a new art suite and technical block along with three specialist computer labs. The College also has an English Language Centre, and there is a comprehensive English as a second language programme available.

== Demographics ==
At the February 2014 Education Review Office (ERO) review, Heretaunga College had 762 students enrolled, including 39 international students. 48 percent of students were male and 52 percent were female. 67 percent of students identified as European (Pākehā), 20 percent identified as Māori, 6 percent as Asian, 5 percent as Pasifika and 2 percent as another ethnicity.

As of 2026, Heretaunga College has an Equity Index of 471, placing it amongst schools whose students have above average socioeconomic barriers to achievement (roughly equivalent to decile 4 under the former socio-economic decile system).

== Notable alumni ==
- John Banks – politician, former MP (1981–99, 2011–14) and Mayor of Auckland City (2001–04, 2007–10), radio host (also attended Avondale College)
- Neil Berkett (businessperson) – chair of the UK Guardian Media Group
- Mary Fisher (attended 2006–2010) – para-swimmer, Paralympic gold medallist (2012, 2016)
- Cory Jane (attended c. 1996–2000) – All Black (2008–)
- Sydney Josland (science teacher c. 1961–72) – bacteriologist at the Wallaceville Animal Research Centre (1929–54) and chief bacteriologist at the National Health Institute, Department of Health (1954–60)
- Dave Rennie (attended c. 1977–81) – professional rugby coach
- Jon Stevens – singer
