= Upper Hutt College =

School in Upper Hutt, New Zealand

Location
- Moonshine Road; Trentham; Upper Hutt 5018; New Zealand; 41.1274°S 175.0405°E

Information
- Type: State co-educational secondary (year 9–13)
- Motto: Be worthy
- Established: 1962
- Ministry of Education Institution no.: 250
- Principal: Judith Taylor
- Enrolment: 1,128 (July 2026)
- Socio-economic decile: 6N

Upper Hutt College is a state co-educational secondary school located in Trentham in the city of Upper Hutt, New Zealand. It opened in 1962 as the city's second state secondary school, supplementing Heretaunga College in Wallaceville. As of July 2026, the school has a roll of 1,128 students from years 9 to 13 (ages 12 to 18).

== Houses ==
The students are divided into four houses, each which are named after a famous New Zealander as voted by the student body in 2004. Each house also has their own colour which is used at school events (e.g, Athletics Day) so each student can represent their house.

- Blake (Sir Peter Blake, red)
- Hillary (Sir Edmund Hillary, yellow/gold)
- Jackson (Sir Peter Jackson, green)
- Te Kanawa (Dame Kiri Te Kanawa, blue)

== Fire ==
On the evening of 1 September 2019, a fire was started in one of the classrooms in the technology block, and quickly got out of control. A number of firefighters and units spent hours getting it under control. Nobody was harmed during the fire.

The school ended up being closed for a number of weeks, due to safety concerns raising from the fire. Asbestos was discovered in the damaged building and had to be removed safely. The main power cable that brought power into the school was under the building that was destroyed, work had to be carried out to make sure there was no damage to cables. The junior school was broken up, and spread out to two different sites so that teaching and learning could be carried on.

Two people were arrested for arson.

== Principals ==
Since its foundation in 1962, Upper Hutt College has had six principals. The following is a complete list:

	Name	Term
1	Allan Hunter	1962–1969
2	Malcolm Ross	1969–1978
3	David Scott	1979–1995
4	Peter Lee	1995–2004
5	David Olivier	2005–2008
6	Judith Taylor	2009–present

== Notable alumni ==
- Ray Ahipene-Mercer – Wellington City councillor
- Rebecca Kitteridge – Director of Security for the Security Intelligence Service (SIS)
- Sika Manu – Professional rugby league footballer
