= Neil Berkett =

New Zealand businessperson

- Occupation: Businessperson
- Employer: Guardian Media Group

Neil Berkett is a New Zealand-born England-based businessperson.

Berkett is currently the chairperson of Guardian Media Group, having succeeded Amelia Fawcett in 2013. He joined the board in 2009.

Berkett is active in NZEdge.com, an organisation that connects expat New Zealanders.

He attended Heretaunga College and the Victoria University of Wellington.
