= Golder Cottage =

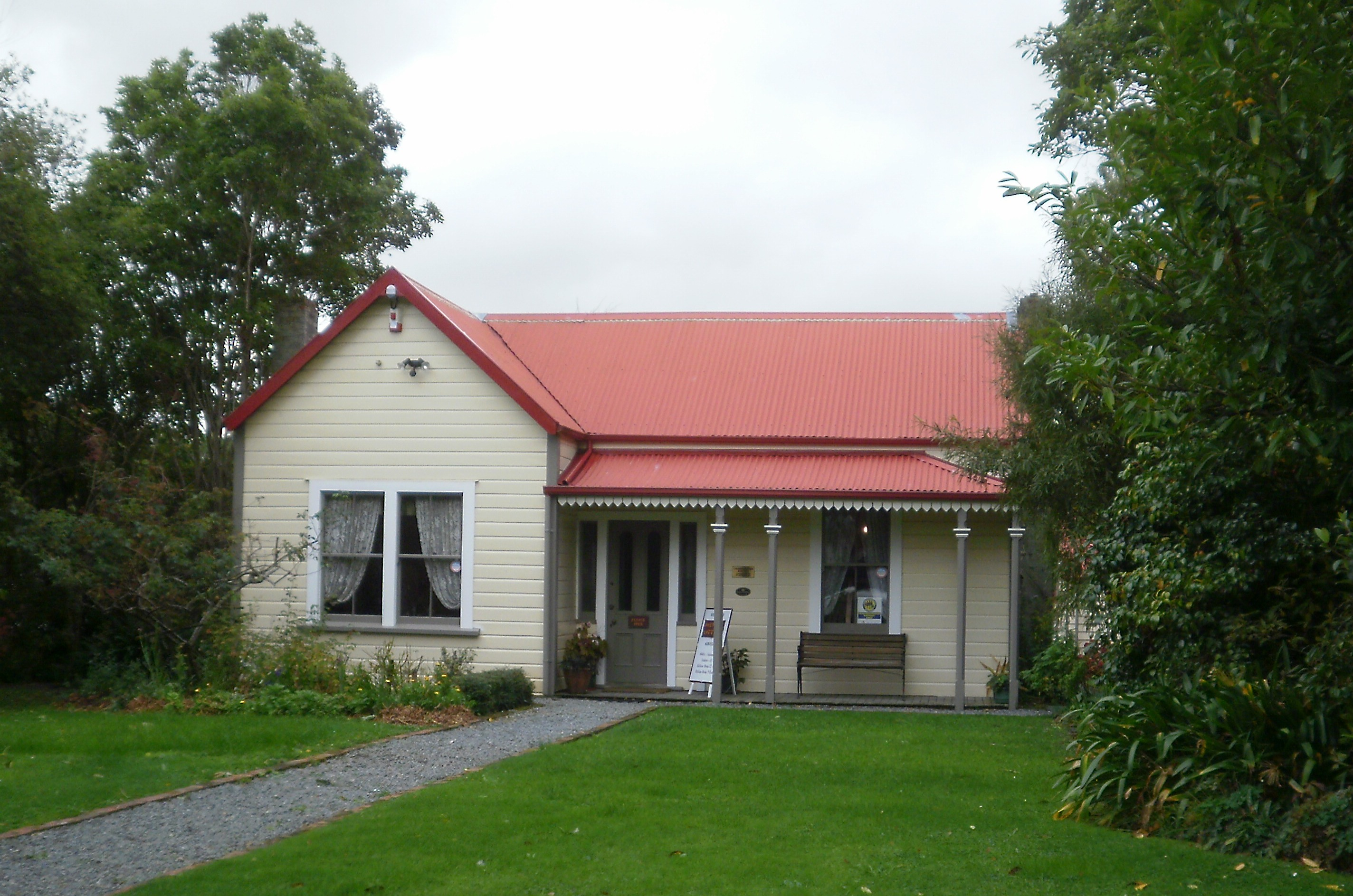
- Interactive map of the Golder Cottage area

General information
- Type: House
- Architectural style: Victorian
- Location: Upper Hutt, New Zealand
- Coordinates: 41°7′31.85″S 175°3′22.54″E
- Completed: 1876

Heritage New Zealand – Category 2
- Designated: 1991
- Reference no.: 2891

Golder Cottage is one of the oldest surviving colonial houses in Upper Hutt, New Zealand. The house is used as a museum of colonial domestic life.

John Golder, a road builder in Wellington, built the cottage in 1876–77. Around the same time he married Jane Martin and together they raised 12 children in the house. The cottage remained in the family for over 100 years until the Upper Hutt City Council bought the property. The Golder's Homestead Museum Society have since renovated the building and now manage the property.

== See also ==
- List of historic places in Upper Hutt
