= Thomas Rawlings Mould =

Thomas Rawlings Mould CB
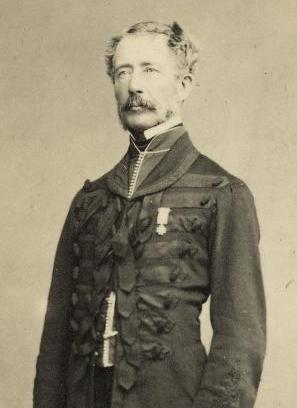
- Thomas Rawlings Mould, c. 1866
- Born: 31 May 1805; Portsea, Hampshire
- Died: 13 June 1886 (aged 81); Queen's Road, Bayswater, London
- Relatives: William Temple (son-in-law)
- Military career
- Allegiance: United Kingdom
- Branch: Board of Ordnance; British Army
- Years of service: 1826–1867
- Rank: Major General
- Service number: 606
- Unit: Corps of Royal Engineers
- Commands: CRE, New Zealand, 1856–66; Auckland Regiment of New Zealand Militia, 1860– CRE, Portsmouth, 1866–67
- Campaigns: New Zealand Wars; Taranaki, 1860–61; Mahoetahi, 1860
- Awards: Companion of the Order of the Bath, 1862; New Zealand War Medal; Good Service Pension
- Other work: Inspector of Public Works, New Zealand, 1857– Justice of the Peace, New Zealand, 1860–

Major General Thomas Rawlings Mould CB (31 May 1805–13 June 1886) was an English military engineer of the Corps of Royal Engineers and Colonel of the Auckland Regiment of New Zealand Militia.

Mould was commissioned as a second lieutenant in the Royal Engineers in 1826. He served on the Ordnance Survey of Ireland from November 1827 to 17 August 1835, in the West Indies from 7 May 1836 to 30 September 1839, and designed covered slips at Chatham Dockyard in the 1840s. He went to New Zealand in 1855. He designed the Upper Hutt blockhouse, built in 1860 to protect European settlers during the Wellington Wars, and planned the same type of structure at Blockhouse Bay in Auckland. He also did work in connection with Albert Barracks in Auckland.

== Publications ==
- Mould, Thomas Rawlings (1862). "IV. On the Engineer Operations carried on in New Zealand during the War in 1860-61. Extracted from Reports and Journals sent by Col. Mould, C.B., Commanding Royal Engineer in New Zealand, to the Deputy Adjutant General, Royal Engineers" (PDF). Papers on Subjects Connected with the Duties of the Corps of Royal Engineers. 11 New Series. Woolwich: 95–110.
- Mould, Thomas Rawlings (1869). "III. Sketch of Military Proceedings in New Zealand, from the Termination of the Waitara Campaign, in March, 1861" (PDF). Papers on Subjects Connected with the Duties of the Corps of Royal Engineers. 17 New Series. Woolwich: 12–42.
