= St John's Church, Trentham =

St John's Anglican Church
- St John the Evangelist Church
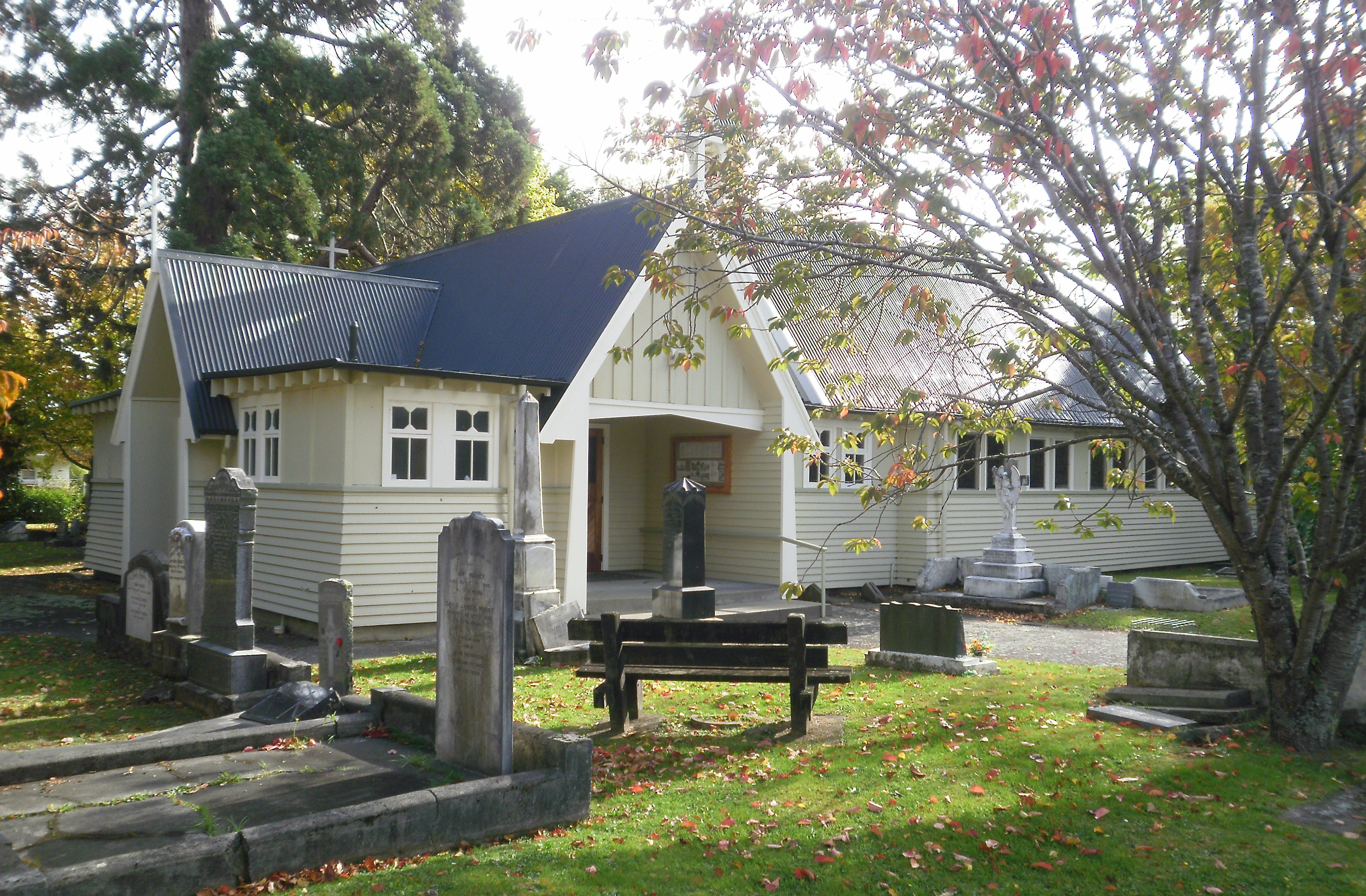
- St John's Anglican Church
- St John's Anglican Church
- 41°07′49″S 175°02′39″E
- Address: 563 Fergusson Drive, Trentham, Upper Hutt
- Country: New Zealand
- Denomination: Anglican
- Website: stjohnstrentham.org.nz

History
- Status: Church
- Dedication: John the Evangelist
- Consecrated: 1865

Architecture
- Architects: Rev'd Frederic Thatcher (1861); Frederick de Jersey Clere (1884)
- Architectural type: Church
- Style: Gothic Revival
- Years built: 1861–1863

Specifications
- Materials: Timber

Administration
- Province: Anglican Church in Aotearoa, New Zealand and Polynesia
- Diocese: Wellington
- Parish: Trentham

Clergy
- Vicar(s): Rev. Jessica Falconer & Rev. Simon Falconer

Heritage New Zealand – Category 2
- Official name: St John's Church (Anglican)
- Designated: 6 June 1983
- Reference no.: 1330

St John's Church is a heritage-listed Anglican church located at 563 Fergusson Drive, Trentham, Upper Hutt, New Zealand. The church is one of the oldest surviving Anglican churches in the Wellington region. Heritage New Zealand classified it a Category 2 historic building on 6 June 1983.

== Early years ==
The area presently known as Trentham was originally a 100-acre (40 ha) farm belonging to Richard Barton, who had come to New Zealand from his former position as Superintendent to the Duke of Sutherland's estates in Staffordshire, England, then known as Trentham Hall. In the 1840s the Bartons settled in Upper Hutt, and their house and estate were named Trentham.

The Barton's donated the funds for the land on which St John's church now stands and gave significant support to the construction, including that of a vicarage in 1894.

The actual construction of the Church itself was overseen by Rev Frederic Thatcher, who was a noted church architect of the time. The first Vicar was Rev John E. Herring, who visited on 27 December 1861 and performed his first baptism as Vicar on 30 March 1862. Rev Herring's tenure was quite short, and he was succeeded by Rev Amos Knell on 27 September 1863.

Richard Barton was interred in the grounds of St John's Church, and there are also memorials to him in the form of brass plaques within the Church building.

== Consecration ==
The construction of St John's was started in 1861 and finished in 1863, with it being consecrated two years later in 1865.

The Rev Thomas Abraham served as a Deacon in charge of the parish from August 1865 to April 1868. By this time, the original central portion of the present church building was completed, but it was not until 17 December 1865 that Bishop Abraham consecrated the building and its church-acre.

Originally only the nave of the church existed, but considerable development occurred in the Upper Hutt area, with an increase in settlement encouraged by the railway line, completed through to Upper Hutt in 1876. In 1884 architect Frederick de Jersey Clere was commissioned to add on a chancel and sanctuary to the church building, and a Vestry added in 1914. However, it proved difficult to retain clergy in the area, and for several periods in the latter part of the nineteenth century. In January 1903, Rev Cecil J Smith arrived at Trentham, and proceeded to re-invigorate the parish and the local area.

== Recent years ==
During the 1950s, growth at St John's was so significant that two major events occurred; the first was the enlargement of the church building by extending the sides, completed in 1955, and the second was the completion of the present Parish hall in the 1960s.

The only other change to the building at St John's has been the completion of a foyer in the 1980s, and the more recent replacement of pinex ceilings with gib, completed during 2004.

== Churchyard ==
The churchyard was the earliest European cemetery in the district with people being buried there as soon as the land was consecrated in 1865. The earliest identifiable gravestone is that of Richard Barton, founding father of both church and district. A number of Upper Hutt's early settlers are buried there, altogether over a thousand people. Today it is closed except for ashes interment, but has always been a focus of interest and sometimes curiosity. The churchyard also contains the Commonwealth war graves of three New Zealand soldiers from World War I and two from World War II.

== See also ==
- List of historic places in Upper Hutt
