= Upper Hutt Blockhouse =

Coordinates: 41°7′45.23″S 175°3′6.27″E

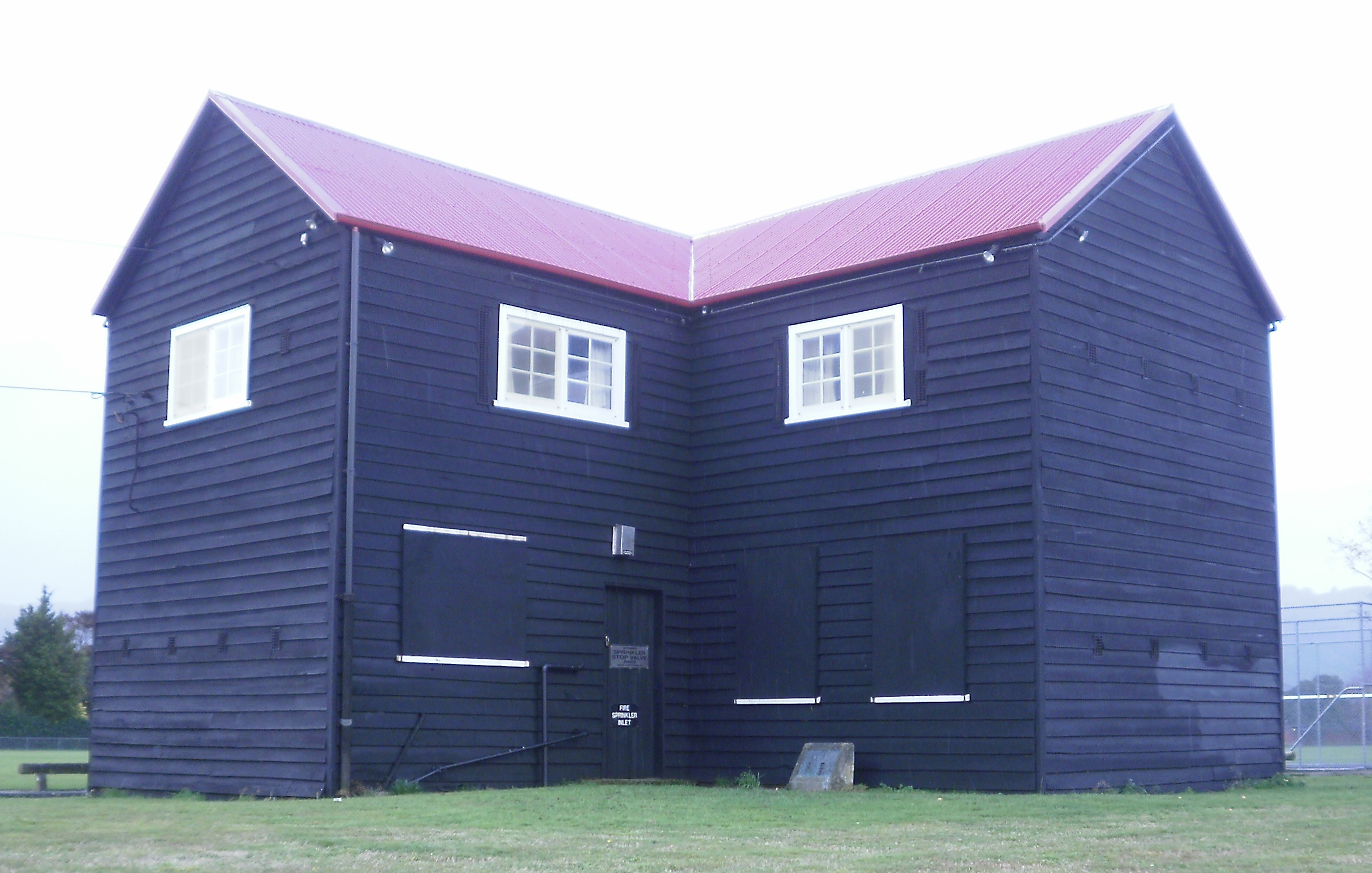
- Interactive map of the Upper Hutt Blockhouse area
- Former names: Upper Hutt Stockade or Government Stockade
- Alternative names: Wallaceville Blockhouse

General information
- Type: Blockhouse, fort
- Location: Blockhouse Lane, off McHardie Street, Upper Hutt, New Zealand
- Completed: 1860
- Renovated: 1927–28

Technical details
- Structural system: Timber framed, shingle infill
- Floor count: 2

Design and construction
- Architect: Col. Thomas Rawlings Mould
- Architecture firm: Royal Engineers
- Main contractor: W Taylor
- Designations: Category 1 Historic Place

The Upper Hutt Blockhouse also known as the Wallaceville Blockhouse is a 19th-century American-style military blockhouse situated in Upper Hutt, New Zealand. One of very few such blockhouses built in New Zealand, it is preserved as a Category I historic place. It was built in late 1860 as part of a larger stockade and was one of two blockhouses and stockades built in the Hutt Valley that year. It was occupied by the Hutt Battalion of the Wellington Militia from December 1860 to May 1861 without coming under hostile attack.

Originally built in a paddock at the end of Fortune Lane, that was later described as the "old Government Stockade" reserve; the blockhouse can now be found at the end of Blockhouse Lane, off McHardie Street, adjacent to the sports fields within the grounds of Heretaunga College.

== Background ==
In 1860, Māori in the Ōtaki district were hostile, and there was also fear of raids from Wairarapa Māori, leading settlers to petition for construction of a refuge. The disputed land sale at Waitara in Taranaki also heightened fear of unrest.

In July 1860, after tenders had closed for constructing a Stockade and Blockhouse in Lower Hutt, Upper Hutt settlers formed a Volunteer Rifle Corps and petitioned the Wellington Militia for erection of a stockade in Upper Hutt, also.

== Construction ==
The blockhouse was designed by Col. Thomas Mould and built towards the end of 1860. On 18 August 1860, Major W. Rawson Trafford, commanding Wellington Militia and Volunteers, announced that plans for a Stockade and Blockhouse to be built at the Upper Hutt, on McHardy's Clearing were available from the Royal Engineers office in Lower Hutt and that tenders for either one, or both closed at Noon on 5 September 1860. The successful tenderer, Mr W. Taylor, had previously constructed the Lower Hutt Blockhouse and Stockade.

The frame of the two-story structure is made from timber and double-skinned with shingle infill, to protect it from rifle fire. Loopholes were also built into the blockhouse so defenders could return fire.

The building was at one corner of a stockade formed by a perimeter earthwork with parapet and trench. A well and magazine were within the stockade. The stockade earthworks have since been removed and the surrounding land levelled during the construction of Heretaunga College in 1954.

According to Best the blockhouse was never used as a refuge, but there are anecdotal reports of families retreating there one night in the late 1880s or early 1890s during an undefined emergency.

The blockhouse has been subject to some modifications over the years. Originally the blockhouse did not have windows. Two upper-level windows that were cut in the western end-wall before 1916 have been replaced by a single window, while on the inward facing walls, one upper-level window has been enlarged and another added since 1916. The windows cut in the lower level of the inward facing walls have instead been covered up.

Electric power, security lights, fire alarm and a sprinkler system are more recent additions, as are the metal gratings over the loopholes. The building has also been restored with a black stain applied to the wood and has red corrugated iron roof, a colour scheme similar to how the building would have looked in the 1860s.

== Use ==
The Hutt Battalion of the Wellington Militia occupied the blockhouse and stockade from December 1860 until May 1861, without hostilities, according to the memorial plaque. By October 1861, the Bishop of Wellington was asking to rent the stockade from the Colonial Government for "a Sunday School and place of Divine Worship". Instead between 1861 and 1880, it was given over to the Police, for use as a residence, station and circuit courthouse. After the Upper Hutt Police Constable's position was retrenched in 1880, the blockhouse was still used occasionally as a public building. In July 1884, the School Committee asked to lease the stockade reserve from the Commissioner of Crown Lands. In 1891, the Police opened a new station at the corner of Main Road and Station Street, leaving the Blockhouse disused for many years.

== Twentieth-century history ==
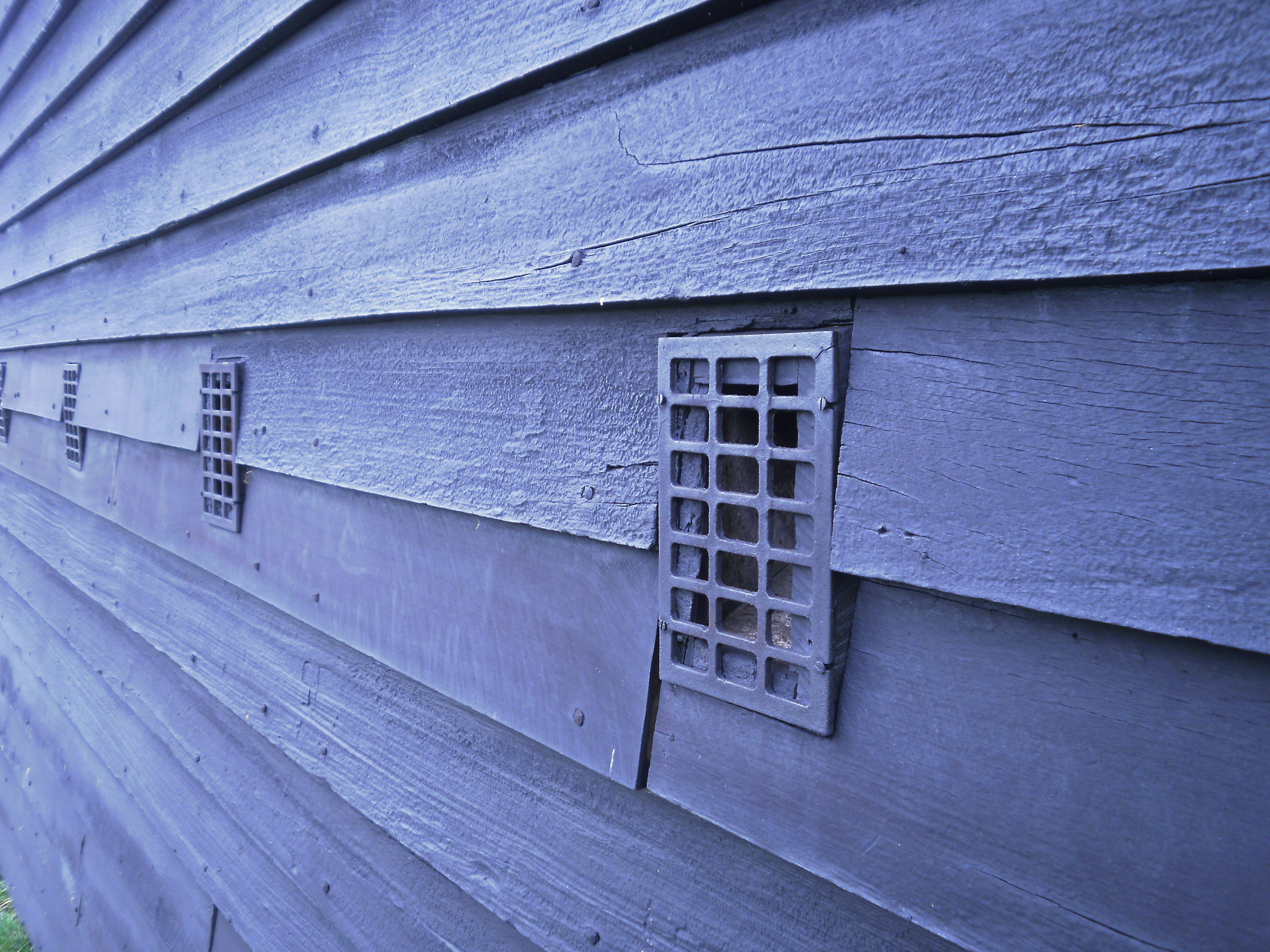
A close-up of a loophole, built so defenders could shoot from within.

Local people expressed interest in the conservation of the structure, and in 1916 the land was reserved under the Scenery Preservation Act 1908. This was one of the first instances of a historic building being accorded legal protection in New Zealand. In 1927–28 the building was significantly repaired and windows were added on the inner side of the L-shaped wall. A Committee to Restore the Blockhouse was formed during the 1950s and the building was restored about 1954. From 1953 to the late 1990s Boy Scouts and Girl Guides used the building. A service club also used the building as a meeting venue.

In 1980 the blockhouse and the neighbouring land was classified as an historic reserve under the Reserves Act 1977. Soon after that, the New Zealand Historic Places Trust (now Heritage New Zealand Pouhere Taonga) took over management of the building.

The building was further modified around 1989.

The building is open to visit by request at Upper Hutt Blockhouse booking enquiry.

== See also ==
- List of historic places in Upper Hutt
