= Wallaceville =

Suburb of Upper Hutt, New Zealand

- Suburb
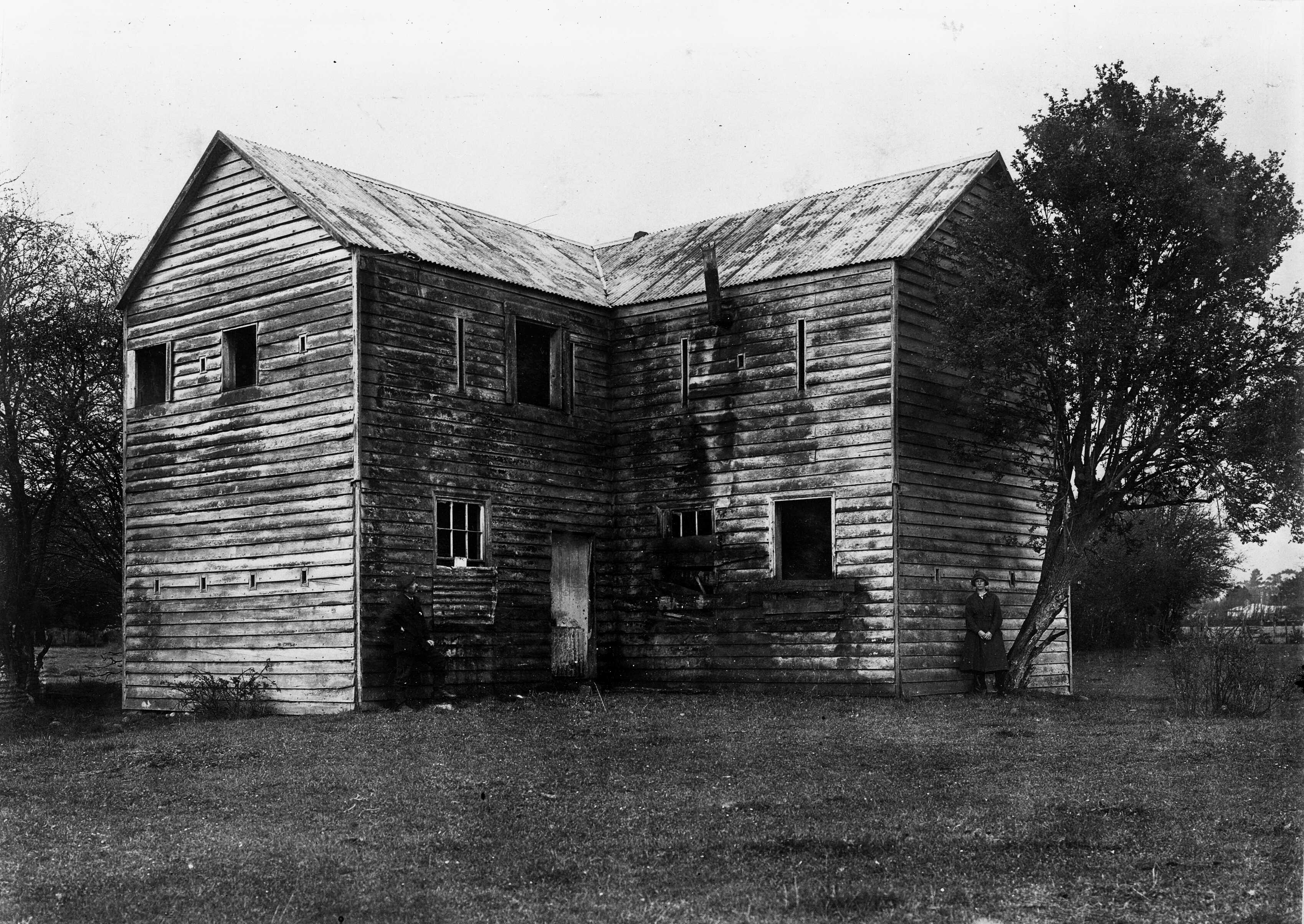
- Blockhouse in Wallaceville, 1919
- Interactive map of Wallaceville
- Coordinates: 41.130°S 175.058°E
- Country: New Zealand
- Region: Wellington Region
- Territorial authority: Upper Hutt
- Electorates: Remutaka; Ikaroa-Rāwhiti (Māori)

Government
  - Territorial Authority: Upper Hutt City Council
  - Regional council: Greater Wellington Regional Council
  - Mayor of Upper Hutt: Peri Zee
  - Remutaka MP: Chris Hipkins
  - Ikaroa-Rāwhiti MP: Cushla Tangaere-Manuel

Area
  - Total: 0.70 km^{2} (0.27 sq mi)

Population (June 2025)
  - Total: 2,490
  - Density: 3,600/km^{2} (9,200/sq mi)

Wallaceville is a suburb of Upper Hutt (located in the lower (southern) North Island of New Zealand). It is named after John Howard Wallace, an early New Zealand settler, council politician, businessman and author of one of the first published histories of New Zealand.

The suburb is home to the oldest surviving wooden blockhouse in New Zealand, and is served by Wallaceville Railway Station.

== History ==
The name of Wallaceville was first given to a township of 56 lots of about an acre each in the Mangaroa Valley that J. H. Wallace sold on 15 January 1868. Access to the township, as well as the rest of the Mungaroa and Whitemans Valley was by a road, later known as Wallaceville Road, that has been built between 1864 and 1867 by the Mungaroa Road Board, of which Wallace was also the chairman.

== Railway station ==
When the railway line reached Upper Hutt in 1876, Wallaceville railway station became a flag station where the line crossed the Wallaceville road (now Ward Street). While the township survived into the early 20th century, it was eventually abandoned and became farmland. However, the name survived and was given to the suburban area developing between the Upper Hutt town centre and the Wallaceville road.

== Demographics ==
Wallaceville statistical area covers 0.70 km^{2} (0.27 sq mi). It had an estimated population of 2,490 as of June 2025, with a population density of 3,557 people per km^{2}.

Historical population
Year	Pop.	±% p.a.
2006	2,226	—
2013	2,253	+0.17%
2018	2,388	+1.17%
2023	2,397	+0.08%

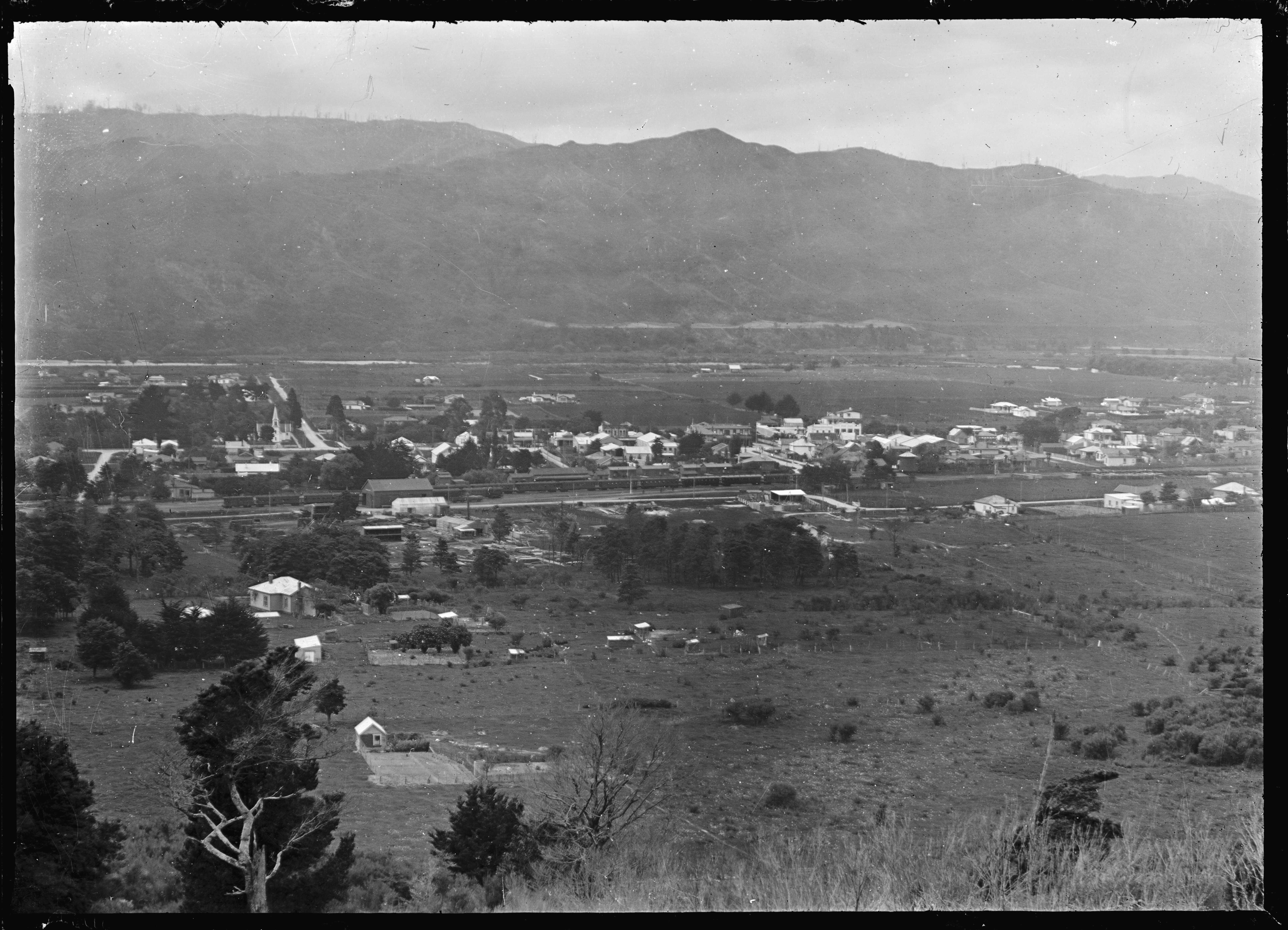
View of Upper Hutt from Wallaceville Hill, 1924. ATLIB 293874

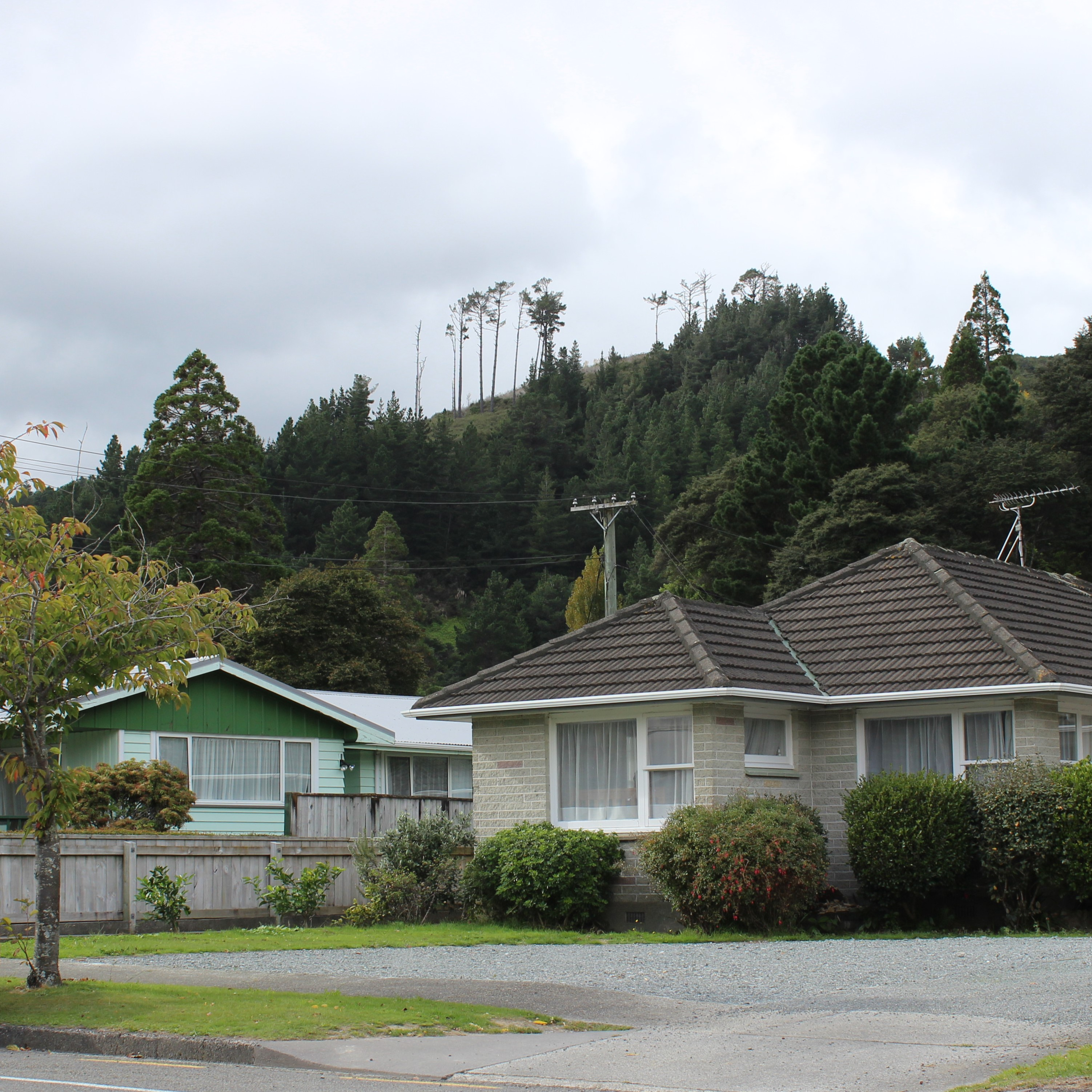
Lane Street, Wallaceville, Upper Hutt, Aotearoa New Zealand

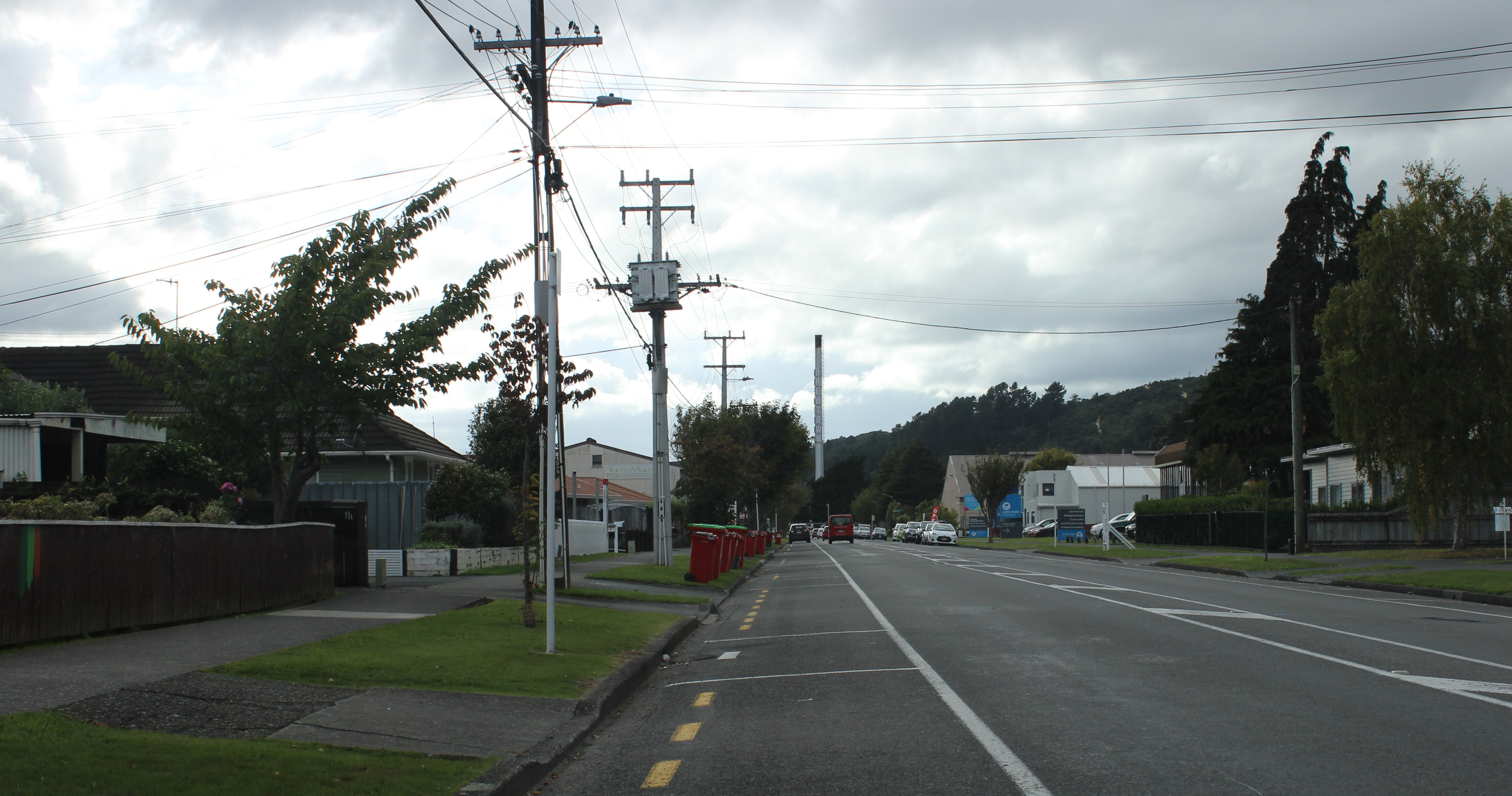
Lane Street, Wallaceville, Upper Hutt, Aotearoa New Zealand

Wallaceville had a population of 2,397 in the 2023 New Zealand census, an increase of 9 people (0.4%) since the 2018 census, and an increase of 144 people (6.4%) since the 2013 census. There were 1,140 males, 1,248 females, and 9 people of other genders in 1,017 dwellings. 5.1% of people identified as LGBTIQ+. The median age was 38.6 years (compared with 38.1 years nationally). There were 426 people (17.8%) aged under 15 years, 417 (17.4%) aged 15 to 29, 1,179 (49.2%) aged 30 to 64, and 375 (15.6%) aged 65 or older.

People could identify as more than one ethnicity. The results were 76.7% European (Pākehā); 16.8% Māori; 7.4% Pasifika; 13.9% Asian; 1.9% Middle Eastern, Latin American and African New Zealanders (MELAA); and 1.5% other, which includes people giving their ethnicity as "New Zealander". English was spoken by 96.9%, Māori by 3.1%, Samoan by 1.6%, and other languages by 13.3%. No language could be spoken by 2.1% (e.g. too young to talk). New Zealand Sign Language was known by 1.1%. The percentage of people born overseas was 23.2, compared with 28.8% nationally.

Religious affiliations were 34.2% Christian, 3.5% Hindu, 0.6% Islam, 0.5% Māori religious beliefs, 0.9% Buddhist, 0.6% New Age, 0.1% Jewish, and 1.5% other religions. People who answered that they had no religion were 52.1%, and 6.1% of people did not answer the census question.

Of those at least 15 years old, 441 (22.4%) people had a bachelor's or higher degree, 1,050 (53.3%) had a post-high school certificate or diploma, and 468 (23.7%) people exclusively held high school qualifications. The median income was $46,300, compared with $41,500 nationally. 231 people (11.7%) earned over $100,000 compared to 12.1% nationally. The employment status of those at least 15 was 1,107 (56.2%) full-time, 237 (12.0%) part-time, and 48 (2.4%) unemployed.

== Places ==
=== Quinn's Post ===
A public house that stood at the corner of what is now Fergusson Drive and Ward Street had a variety of names, including Highland Home, Railway Hotel, and Trentham Hotel before being named Quinn's Post by licensee Richard Quinn, as a tribute to the heroism of the ANZACs at Gallipoli, as recounted by his brother in a letter home from the front line. When a petrol station was built on the corner, and a tavern built next door, both retained the name Quinn's Post.

=== Wallaceville Animal Research Centre ===
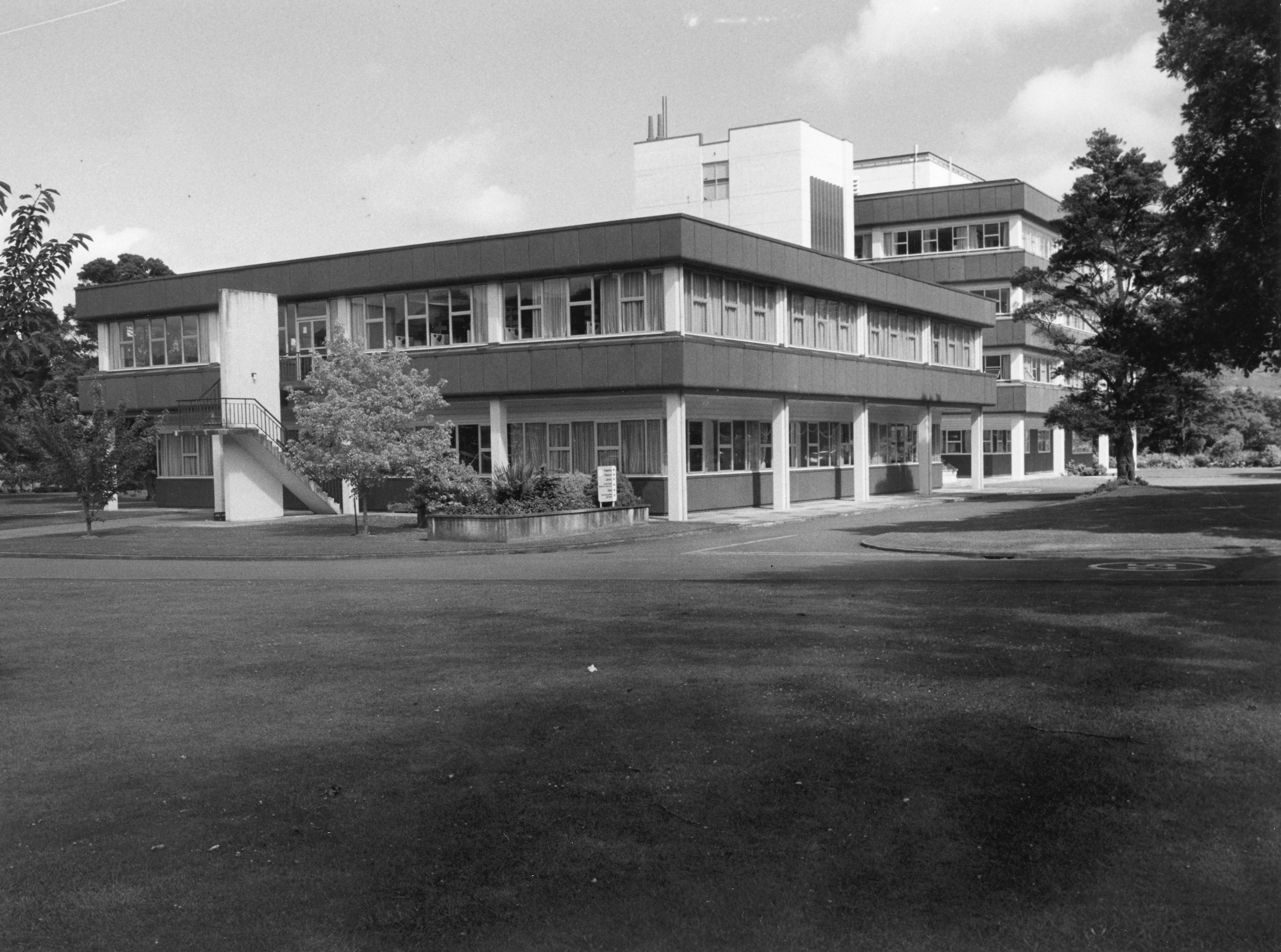
Wallaceville Research Institute, New Zealand (1982)

The Wallaceville Animal Research Centre was a Government-owned veterinary and animal research centre established at Ward Street, Upper Hutt, New Zealand. It represented over one hundred years of government-initiated agricultural research.

==== Establishment ====
In 1892 the New Zealand Government formed the Department of Agriculture. Part of the new department's work was to undertake research on livestock which could then be applied to help the farming community. Initial laboratory research was carried out in makeshift accommodation in Wellington. In 1904 the land at Wallaceville was acquired and a small research laboratory, known as the Wallaceville Laboratory, was opened in June 1905.

New Zealand's first, and at the time only, Government Veterinary Surgeon was John Gilruth. Born in Scotland, Gilruth had been recruited by the New Zealand Government to take charge of the Veterinary Division of the then recently formed Department of Agriculture. Having qualified as a Veterinary Surgeon at the age of 21 and aged only 23 at the time of his appointment, Gilruth had added several years to his age, apparently in case the recruiters disapproved of his youth.

The Wallaceville Veterinary Laboratory was established on a 100-acre (or 130-acre) block of land that was swampy and required clearing. The original, "1905 Laboratory" still exists as a Historic Place Category 1.

==== Development ====
It took some time for suitable laboratory buildings and staff accommodation to be constructed. However over the next 70 years the site and staff numbers continued to grow and by the late 1970s over 200 staff were employed at Wallaceville carrying out world-leading research and testing. AgResearch had until mid 2014 its National Centre for Biosecurity and Infectious Diseases at Wallaceville.

==== Closure ====
Although a small section was retained for the National Centre for Biosecurity, the main site closed in 2007; the majority of research functions being relocated. In 2014 the remainder of the site was sold to a private owner for property development. The campus buildings have been repurposed as a business park, while the farmland, which is known as Wallaceville Estate, is being turned into a residential subdivision with streets named after notable researchers at the Research Centre including Cyril Hopkirk and Dr Malcolm Buddle.

==== Notable employees ====
By 1907 over 85 acres had been cleared, 45 acres having been sown in permanent pasture, with hedging established and oats and other forage crops planted for animal feed. With some foresight, specimen Totara trees were left and Elms and Oaks were planted along the road frontage, most of which still remain over 100 years later.

- Ira Cunningham
- John Filmer
- Cyril Hopkirk
- Sydney Josland

== Education ==
Heretaunga College is a co-educational state secondary school for Year 9 to 13 students, with a roll of 865 as of July 2026. It was founded in 1954.

It includes Titiro Whakamua, a specialist unit for teen parents.

== Climate ==
Climate data for Wallaceville (1991–2020)
Month	Jan	Feb	Mar	Apr	May	Jun	Jul	Aug	Sep	Oct	Nov	Dec	Year
Mean daily maximum °C (°F)	22.0 (71.6)	22.4 (72.3)	20.7 (69.3)	18.0 (64.4)	15.7 (60.3)	13.2 (55.8)	12.7 (54.9)	13.4 (56.1)	14.8 (58.6)	16.2 (61.2)	17.8 (64.0)	20.2 (68.4)	17.3 (63.1)
Daily mean °C (°F)	17.2 (63.0)	17.4 (63.3)	15.6 (60.1)	13.1 (55.6)	11.1 (52.0)	8.8 (47.8)	8.2 (46.8)	8.9 (48.0)	10.5 (50.9)	11.9 (53.4)	13.4 (56.1)	15.8 (60.4)	12.7 (54.8)
Mean daily minimum °C (°F)	12.4 (54.3)	12.3 (54.1)	10.5 (50.9)	8.2 (46.8)	6.4 (43.5)	4.4 (39.9)	3.7 (38.7)	4.4 (39.9)	6.1 (43.0)	7.7 (45.9)	9.0 (48.2)	11.4 (52.5)	8.0 (46.5)
Average rainfall mm (inches)	78.2 (3.08)	65.2 (2.57)	84.7 (3.33)	74.7 (2.94)	97.6 (3.84)	132.9 (5.23)	134.0 (5.28)	127.3 (5.01)	112.3 (4.42)	144.0 (5.67)	113.9 (4.48)	111.9 (4.41)	1,276.7 (50.26)
Source: NIWA

== See also ==
- Upper Hutt Blockhouse
