= Pinehaven =

Suburb of Upper Hutt, New Zealand

- Suburb
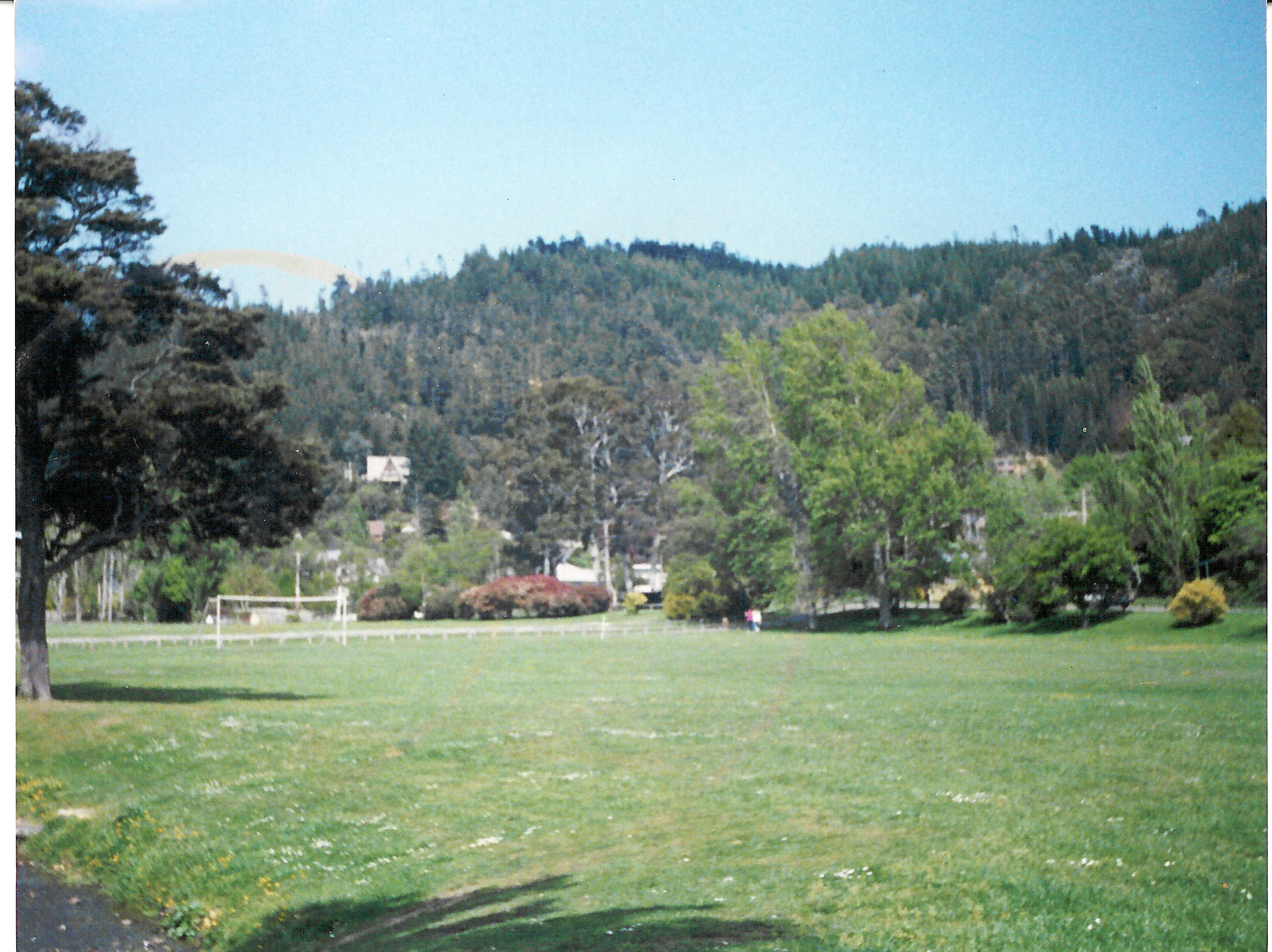
- Pinehaven Reserve taken c. 1980
- Interactive map of Pinehaven
- Coordinates: 41.160°S 175.014°E
- Country: New Zealand
- Region: Wellington Region
- Territorial authority: Upper Hutt
- Established: 1927
- Electorates: Remutaka; Ikaroa-Rāwhiti (Māori)

Government
  - Territorial Authority: Upper Hutt City Council
  - Regional council: Greater Wellington Regional Council
  - Mayor of Upper Hutt: Peri Zee
  - Remutaka MP: Chris Hipkins
  - Ikaroa-Rāwhiti MP: Cushla Tangaere-Manuel

Area
  - Total: 5.59 km^{2} (2.16 sq mi)

Population (June 2025)
  - Total: 1,950
  - Density: 349/km^{2} (903/sq mi)

Pinehaven is a suburb of Upper Hutt City in the lower North Island of New Zealand, established in 1927. It is at the southern end of the city, within the pine covered hills east of Silverstream.

Pinehaven is a valley centred on a large reserve and area of native bush. Clustered around the reserve are a number of community facilities.

== History ==
The hills of Pinehaven were first planted with their trademark pine trees in 1928 by Sir Francis Chichester and Mr G.D.M Goodwin. Most of the streets in Pinehaven are named after members of their families, Wyndham (Road) was Goodwin's son, Jocelyn (Crescent) his daughter and Elmslie (Road) his mother's maiden name. Of course, Chichester Drive is named after Sir Francis himself.

Originally Pinehaven was a community of small baches where residents of Wellington city escaped to for weekends and holidays. Pinehaven has a strong history of community togetherness and since the 1940s the residents' association, the Pinehaven Progressive Association, has actively fought for local issues and organised social functions.

During the December 1976 Wellington Storm, a state of emergency was declared at Pinehaven after slips blocked drains and streams, causing flooding and damage to properties.

== Demographics ==
Pinehaven statistical area covers 5.59 km^{2} (2.16 sq mi). It had an estimated population of 1,950 as of June 2025, with a population density of 349 people per km^{2}.

Historical population
Year	Pop.	±% p.a.
2006	1,848	—
2013	1,890	+0.32%
2018	1,983	+0.97%
2023	1,920	−0.64%

Pinehaven had a population of 1,920 in the 2023 New Zealand census, a decrease of 63 people (−3.2%) since the 2018 census, and an increase of 30 people (1.6%) since the 2013 census. There were 975 males, 924 females, and 21 people of other genders in 732 dwellings. 5.6% of people identified as LGBTIQ+. The median age was 40.2 years (compared with 38.1 years nationally). There were 390 people (20.3%) aged under 15 years, 309 (16.1%) aged 15 to 29, 972 (50.6%) aged 30 to 64, and 252 (13.1%) aged 65 or older.

People could identify as more than one ethnicity. The results were 90.5% European (Pākehā); 9.5% Māori; 3.8% Pasifika; 6.4% Asian; 1.2% Middle Eastern, Latin American and African New Zealanders (MELAA); and 3.8% other, which includes people giving their ethnicity as "New Zealander". English was spoken by 97.5%, Māori by 2.5%, Samoan by 0.5%, and other languages by 11.6%. No language could be spoken by 1.7% (e.g. too young to talk). New Zealand Sign Language was known by 0.8%. The percentage of people born overseas was 25.3, compared with 28.8% nationally.

Religious affiliations were 29.4% Christian, 1.4% Hindu, 0.2% Māori religious beliefs, 0.9% Buddhist, 0.5% New Age, and 2.3% other religions. People who answered that they had no religion were 57.7%, and 8.0% of people did not answer the census question.

Of those at least 15 years old, 570 (37.3%) people had a bachelor's or higher degree, 807 (52.7%) had a post-high school certificate or diploma, and 159 (10.4%) people exclusively held high school qualifications. The median income was $58,200, compared with $41,500 nationally. 339 people (22.2%) earned over $100,000 compared to 12.1% nationally. The employment status of those at least 15 was 873 (57.1%) full-time, 228 (14.9%) part-time, and 42 (2.7%) unemployed.

== Facilities ==
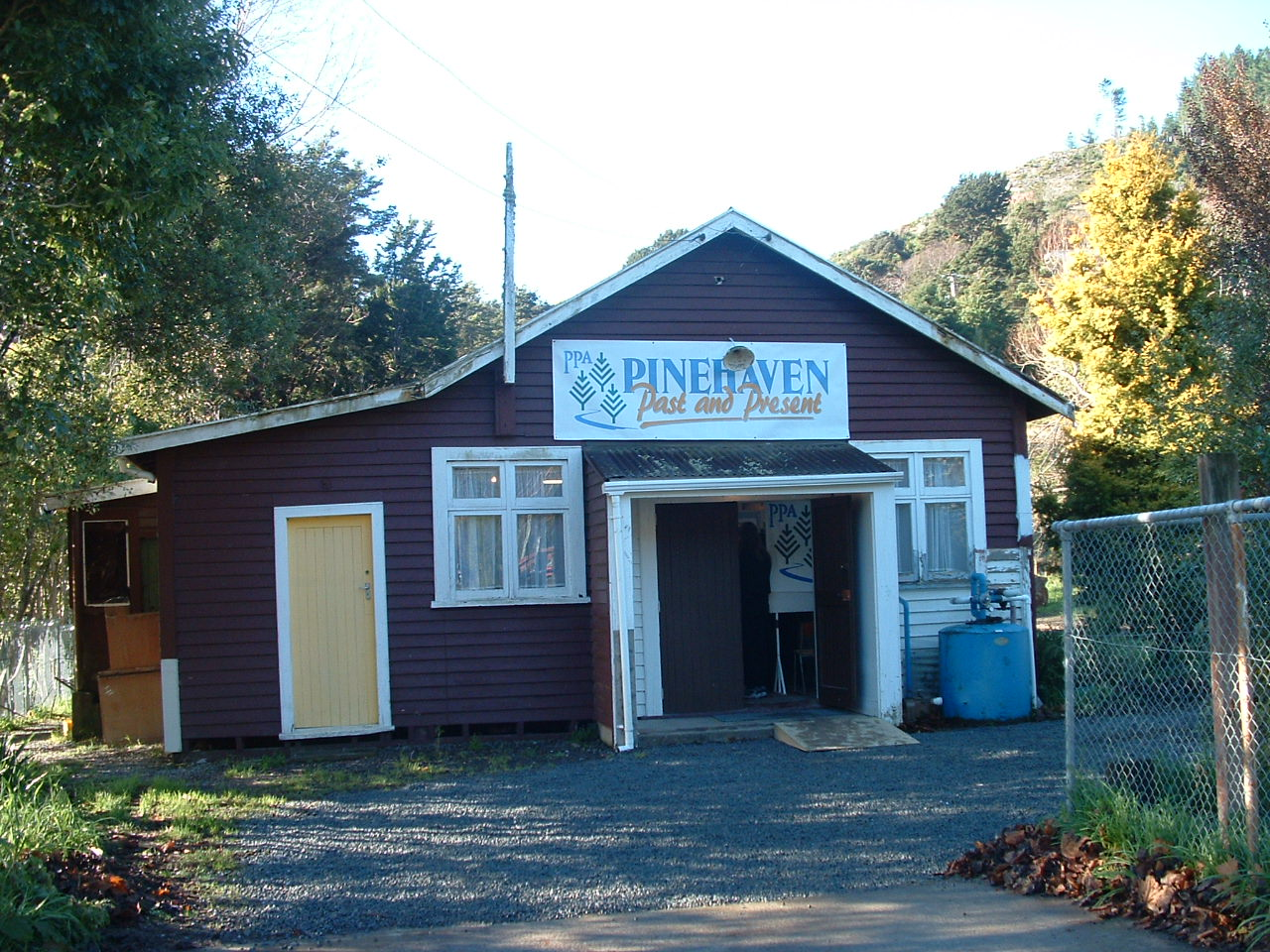
Pinehaven Community Hall in 2004

The Pinehaven Progressive Association Community Hall was built with recycled materials by Pinehaven locals during the 1940s. The land was gifted to the community in perpetuity by a local man, Mr Goodwin.

Pinehaven has a library, which started in 1954 with a small collection of books kept in a resident's home. This was moved to a small room at the side of the Community Hall and then, in the 1960s, a larger building was built for the library on the corner of Jocelyn Crescent and Pinehaven Road. This was run for many years by local resident, Mrs Druce.

A Scout Hall was built in 1972 and there are also two tennis courts next to the Pinehaven Reserve.

== Education ==
Pinehaven School is a co-educational state primary school for Year 1 to 6 students, with a roll of 183 as of July 2026. It opened in 1954.

Pinehaven Playcentre, opened in the 1970s, provides preschool education for 0 to 6-year-olds.
