= Cyril Hopkirk =

New Zealand animal science administrator

Cyril Spottiswoode Moy Hopkirk OBE ED (30 October 1894 – 25 September 1987) was a New Zealand animal science administrator and veterinary scientist. He was a world authority on bovine mastitis.

== Early career ==
Born at Hamua, north of Eketāhuna, in 1894, Hopkirk started his scientific career as a cadet in the laboratory of the Biology Department of Victoria University College and in 1912 became a laboratory assistant at the Wallaceville Animal Diagnostic and Research Laboratory.

During World War I, Hopkirk served with the New Zealand Mounted Rifles Brigade in Palestine, reaching the rank of corporal. When he returned from the war, he moved to Australia and attended Melbourne Veterinary School, graduating with a BVSc with first class honours in 1923. He was later awarded the degree of DVSc by the University of Melbourne for his work on bovine mastitis and other animal diseases.

From 1924 to 1945, Hopkirk served in the New Zealand Territorial Force, as an officer in the New Zealand Veterinary Corps. During World War II he was the assistant director of veterinary services for the Central Military District. In 1945 he was transferred to the Reserve of Officers, retiring in 1950. He rose to the rank of major.

Hopkirk became director of the Wallaceville Animal Research Centre in 1923 and would remain in this role until 1945. The bacteriologist Sydney Josland worked under the direction of Hopkirk at the Centre during this period.

== Later career ==
Upon his resignation from the Centre in 1945, Hopkirk worked internationally as a senior veterinarian in the United Nations Relief and Rehabilitation Administration. He was a leader of an FAO mission in Ethiopia and later served as veterinary officer for the New Zealand High Commission in London.

On his return to New Zealand, from 1959 until 1961, Hopkirk held a temporary lectureship at Lincoln College.

Hopkirk was president of the New Zealand Veterinary Association on three occasions and was honorary secretary for 12 years and a councillor.

He was a foundation member of the New Zealand Society of Animal Production and in 1967 was elected Fellow of the New Zealand Institute of Agricultural Science. In 1972, Hopkirk was elected an honorary member of the New Zealand Microbiological Society.

In the 1966 New Year Honours, Hopkirk was appointed an Officer of the Order of the British Empire for services in the field of veterinary science.

He died at Havelock North in 1987.

The Hopkirk Research Institute, which is part of Massey University in Palmerston North, is named after Hopkirk.
