= Trentham, New Zealand =

Suburb of Upper Hutt City, New Zealand

Trentham
- Suburb
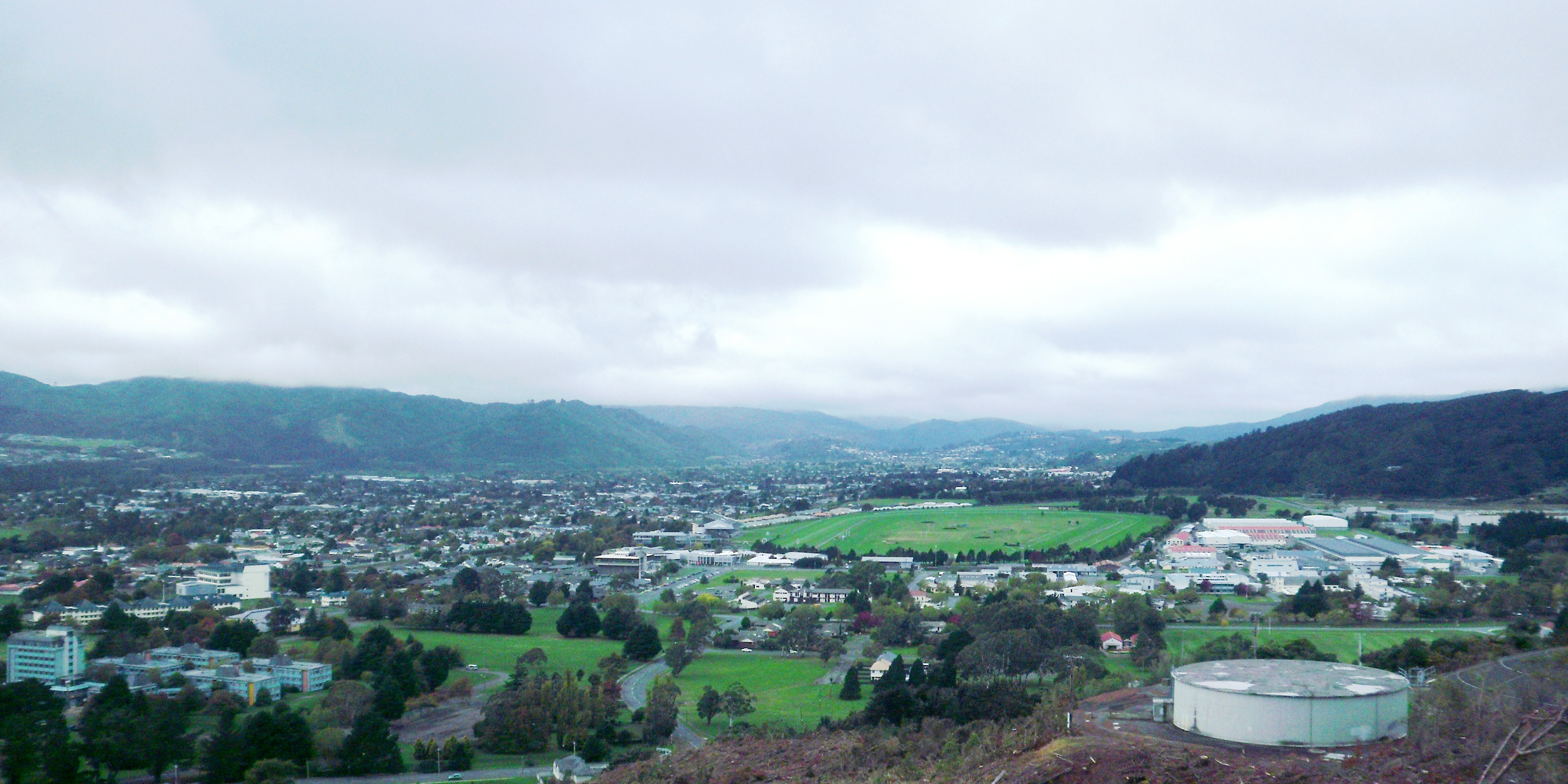
- View looking northeast from Silverstream, with Trentham Racecourse in the centre and Trentham Army Camp at right
- Interactive map of Trentham
- Coordinates: 41°08′07″S 175°02′25″E
- Country: New Zealand
- Region: Wellington Region
- Territorial authority: Upper Hutt
- Electorates: Remutaka; Ikaroa-Rāwhiti (Māori)

Government
  - Territorial Authority: Upper Hutt City Council
  - Regional council: Greater Wellington Regional Council
  - Mayor of Upper Hutt: Peri Zee
  - Remutaka MP: Chris Hipkins
  - Ikaroa-Rāwhiti MP: Cushla Tangaere-Manuel

Area
  - Total: 11.37 km^{2} (4.39 sq mi)

Population (June 2025)
  - Total: 11,730
  - Density: 1,032/km^{2} (2,672/sq mi)

Trentham (/ˈtrɛnθəm/) is the most populous suburb of Upper Hutt, a city in the Wellington region of New Zealand. The suburb is located in a widening of the Hutt Valley, five kilometres to the southwest of the Upper Hutt city centre.

The suburb includes the Trentham Racecourse, the base of the Wellington Racing Club, the site of Hutt International Boys' School, and the Trentham Railway Station.

The Trentham Military Camp was used extensively for training soldiers in preparation for World War I and World War II. It is still a base for the New Zealand Defence Force.

A General Motors-Holden assembly plant operated in Trentham between 1967 and 1990.

== History ==
The area was settled in the 1840s.

The name "Trentham" was initially given by Richard Barton, the first European Settler in the area, in honour of his former employer, the Duke of Sutherland. One of the Duke of Sutherland's subsidiary titles was Viscount Trentham, of Trentham in the County of Stafford.

The Barton family memory lives on in the area, with Barton Road, Barton Avenue and an area of native trees called Barton's Bush, which is within the reserve now known as Trentham Memorial Park. Richard Barton was interred in the grounds of St John's Church, and there are also memorials to him in the form of brass plaques within the Church building.

== Demographics ==
Trentham, comprising the statistical areas of Poets Block, Brentwood, Trentham North and Trentham South, covers 11.37 km^{2} (4.39 sq mi). It had an estimated population of 11,730 as of June 2025, with a population density of 807 people per km^{2}.

Historical population
Year	Pop.	±% p.a.
2006	8,265	—
2013	8,529	+0.45%
2018	9,603	+2.40%
2023	10,956	+2.67%

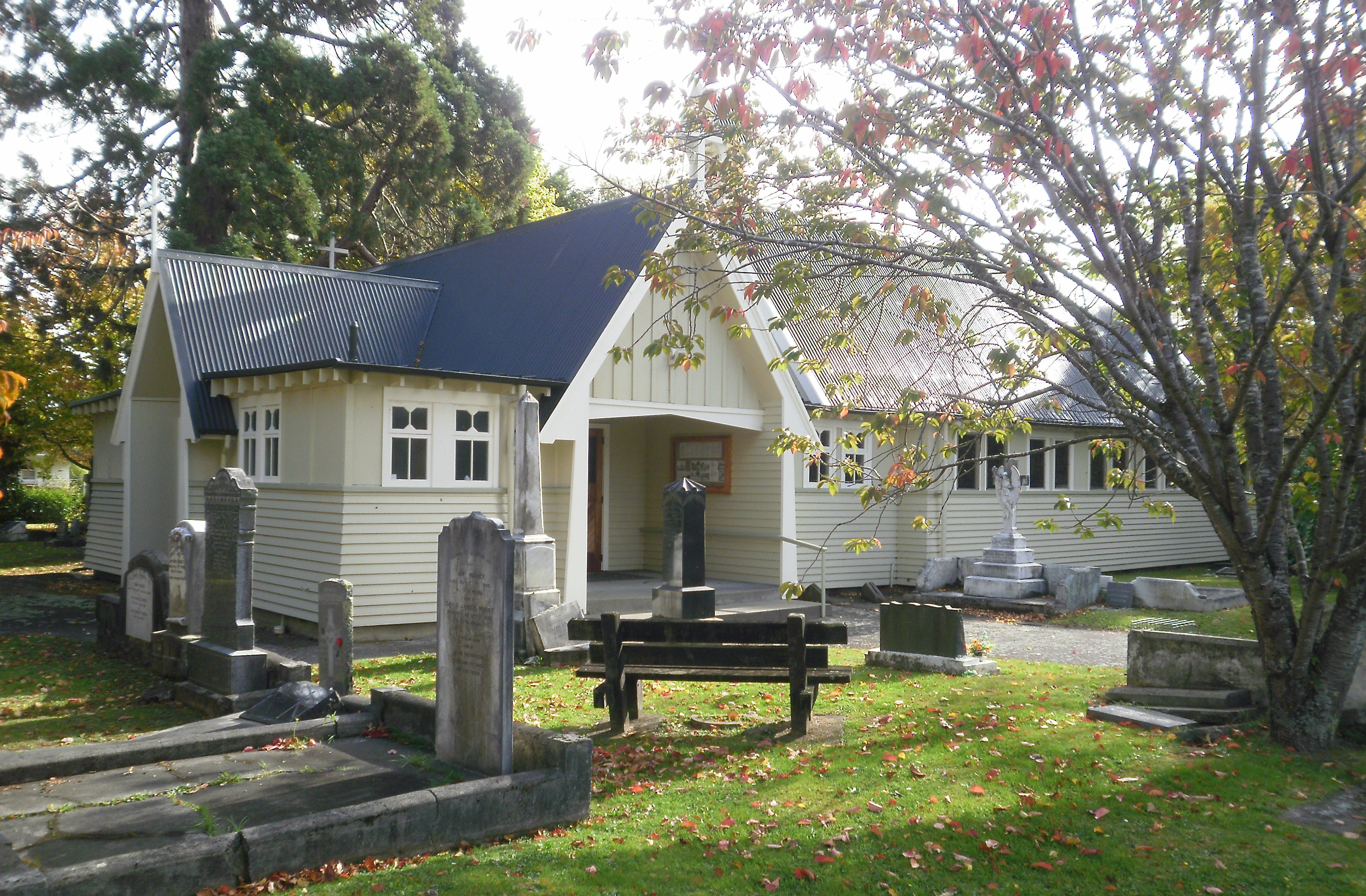
St Johns Church

Trentham had a population of 10,956 in the 2023 New Zealand census, an increase of 1,353 people (14.1%) since the 2018 census, and an increase of 2,427 people (28.5%) since the 2013 census. There were 5,544 males, 5,355 females, and 54 people of other genders in 4,059 dwellings. 3.5% of people identified as LGBTIQ+. The median age was 37.7 years (compared with 38.1 years nationally). There were 2,022 people (18.5%) aged under 15 years, 1,923 (17.6%) aged 15 to 29, 5,223 (47.7%) aged 30 to 64, and 1,788 (16.3%) aged 65 or older.

People could identify as more than one ethnicity. The results were 69.5% European (Pākehā); 18.8% Māori; 7.7% Pasifika; 17.9% Asian; 1.7% Middle Eastern, Latin American and African New Zealanders (MELAA); and 2.8% other, which includes people giving their ethnicity as "New Zealander". English was spoken by 95.5%, Māori by 4.1%, Samoan by 2.2%, and other languages by 16.2%. No language could be spoken by 2.7% (e.g. too young to talk). New Zealand Sign Language was known by 0.7%. The percentage of people born overseas was 26.3, compared with 28.8% nationally.

Religious affiliations were 34.5% Christian, 5.3% Hindu, 1.2% Islam, 1.2% Māori religious beliefs, 1.1% Buddhist, 0.6% New Age, 0.1% Jewish, and 3.2% other religions. People who answered that they had no religion were 46.9%, and 6.3% of people did not answer the census question.

Of those at least 15 years old, 2,079 (23.3%) people had a bachelor's or higher degree, 4,614 (51.6%) had a post-high school certificate or diploma, and 2,235 (25.0%) people exclusively held high school qualifications. The median income was $43,600, compared with $41,500 nationally. 1,230 people (13.8%) earned over $100,000 compared to 12.1% nationally. The employment status of those at least 15 was 4,725 (52.9%) full-time, 894 (10.0%) part-time, and 240 (2.7%) unemployed.

Individual statistical areas
Name	Area (km^{2})	Population	Density (per km^{2})	Dwellings	Median age	Median income
Poets Block	1.24	2,427	1,957	903	36.6 years	$46,000
Brentwood	0.98	2,409	2,458	852	35.9 years	$46,100
Trentham North	1.02	2,988	2,929	1,290	41.6 years	$38,500
Trentham South	8.12	3,132	386	1,017	36.6 years	$45,700
New Zealand					38.1 years	$41,500

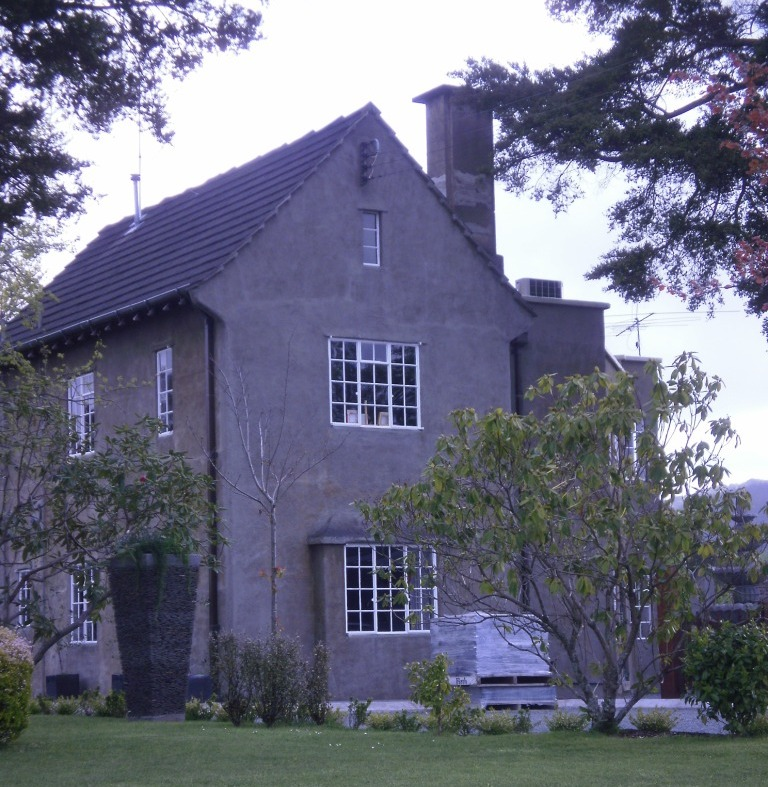
Brentwood manor, formerly Tweed House

== Education ==
Trentham School is a state primary school for Year 1 to 6 students, with a roll of 364. It opened in 1929.

Brentwood School, a state primary school for year 1 to 6 students, opened in 1955 to deal with the overflow from Trentham School. The school was closed in 2004 and merged with Trentham School.

Fergusson Intermediate is a state intermediate school for Year 7 to 8 students, with a roll of 331. It opened in 1966.

Upper Hutt College is a state secondary school for Year 9 to 15 students, with a roll of 1,128. It was founded in 1962.

Hutt International Boys' School is a state-integrated Christian secondary school for Year 7 to 13 students, with a roll of 653. It was founded in 1991.

All of these schools except Hutt International Boys' are co-educational. Rolls are as of July 2026,
