= Fergusson Intermediate =

Intermediate school in Upper Hutt, Wellington, New Zealand

Location
- Hikurangi Street, Trentham, Upper Hutt, New Zealand; 41.1280°S 175.0363°E

Information
- Type: State co-educational intermediate (Year 7-8)
- Motto: Latin: Dulcius ex Asperis (Sweeter because of Difficulty)
- Established: 1966
- Ministry of Education Institution no.: 2841
- Principal: Simon Kenny
- Enrolment: 331 (July 2026)
- Socio-economic decile: 6
- Website: fergusson.school.nz

Fergusson Intermediate is a state co-educational intermediate school in the city of Upper Hutt, situated in the Wellington region of New Zealand. The school's classes are mixed, which means that both Year 7s and Year 8s are included in one class. The school website displays the exhortation: 'AMPLIFY THE AWESOME'.

== History ==
Fergusson Intermediate was opened in 1966 by Sir Bernard Fergusson, then New Zealand's Governor General, and it is from his clan that the school's Latin motto originates.

== Syndicates ==
The school is divided into 4 syndicates.

Remutaka - Rooms 1, 2, 3 & 4

Whirinaki - Rooms 5, 6, 7 & 8

Te Awakairangi - Rooms 9, 10, 11 & 12

Pākuratahi - Arts & Technology

== Teachers ==
- Irene van Dyk; New Zealand netball international.
