= Parkdale, New Zealand =

Parkdale
- Suburb
- Interactive map of Parkdale
- Coordinates: 41.093°S 175.105°E
- Country: New Zealand
- Island: North Island
- City: Upper Hutt
- Established: 1970s
- Electorates: Remutaka; Ikaroa-Rāwhiti (Māori)

Government
  - Territorial Authority: Upper Hutt City Council
  - Regional council: Greater Wellington Regional Council
  - Mayor of Upper Hutt: Peri Zee
  - Remutaka MP: Chris Hipkins
  - Ikaroa-Rāwhiti MP: Cushla Tangaere-Manuel

Area
  - Total: 0.66 km^{2} (0.25 sq mi)

Population (2023 Census)
  - Total: 1,143
  - Density: 1,700/km^{2} (4,500/sq mi)

Parkdale is a mainly residential subdivision in the suburb of Birchville in Upper Hutt, New Zealand. It is located north of the Upper Hutt city centre on the northern side of Emerald Hill nestled between Birchville, Te Mārua, Timberlea and Brown Owl.

Although the developers originally pitched this housing development as a new suburb, this has not been accepted by the Upper Hutt City Council, which considers the subdivision to be part of the suburb of Birchville. Also, from as early as 1982, the New Zealand Geographic Board also clarified that Birchville, rather than Parkdale was the official locality name. Local residents rarely refer to it as a suburb of its own.

The major through street is Gemstone Drive, which runs roughly west–east from Akatarawa Road to the end of the subdivision at Topaz Street, which then connects with State Highway 2. Most other streets in the subdivision are cul-de-sacs and are named, alphabetically from Akatarawa Road, after gemstones (e.g. Amber Grove, Moonstone Grove).

This subdivision has a reputation for being a down-market suburb, because a number of own-your-own or cross-leased units erected early in the development (although this trend did not continue as the development progressed).

There is a Jehovah's Witnesses church at the eastern end of the subdivision.

== Demographics ==
Parkdale covers 0.66 km^{2} (0.25 sq mi). It is part of the Birchville-Brown Owl statistical area, and is also included in the demographics for Birchville.

Historical population
| Year | Pop. | ±% p.a. |
|---|---|---|
| 2006 | 1,158 | — |
| 2013 | 1,146 | −0.15% |
| 2018 | 1,110 | −0.64% |
| 2023 | 1,143 | +0.59% |

Parkdale had a population of 1,143 in the 2023 New Zealand census, an increase of 33 people (3.0%) since the 2018 census, and a decrease of 3 people (−0.3%) since the 2013 census. There were 555 males, 588 females, and 3 people of other genders in 435 dwellings. 3.7% of people identified as LGBTIQ+. There were 243 people (21.3%) aged under 15 years, 225 (19.7%) aged 15 to 29, 537 (47.0%) aged 30 to 64, and 150 (13.1%) aged 65 or older.

People could identify as more than one ethnicity. The results were 82.4% European (Pākehā); 19.9% Māori; 4.7% Pasifika; 7.3% Asian; 1.0% Middle Eastern, Latin American and African New Zealanders (MELAA); and 1.8% other, which includes people giving their ethnicity as "New Zealander". English was spoken by 97.1%, Māori by 3.7%, Samoan by 0.3%, and other languages by 9.4%. No language could be spoken by 2.1% (e.g. too young to talk). New Zealand Sign Language was known by 0.8%. The percentage of people born overseas was 19.4, compared with 28.8% nationally.

Religious affiliations were 27.3% Christian, 0.8% Hindu, 1.0% Māori religious beliefs, 0.5% Buddhist, 0.5% New Age, 0.5% Jewish, and 2.6% other religions. People who answered that they had no religion were 63.0%, and 5.0% of people did not answer the census question.

Of those at least 15 years old, 174 (19.3%) people had a bachelor's or higher degree, 519 (57.7%) had a post-high school certificate or diploma, and 216 (24.0%) people exclusively held high school qualifications. 99 people (11.0%) earned over $100,000 compared to 12.1% nationally. The employment status of those at least 15 was 507 (56.3%) full-time, 126 (14.0%) part-time, and 36 (4.0%) unemployed.
