= Clouston Park =

Suburb of Upper Hutt, New Zealand

- Suburb
- Interactive map of Clouston Park
- Coordinates: 41.1155°S 175.0848°E
- Country: New Zealand
- Region: Wellington Region
- Territorial authority: Upper Hutt
- Electorates: Remutaka; Ikaroa-Rāwhiti (Māori)

Government
  - Territorial Authority: Upper Hutt City Council
  - Regional council: Greater Wellington Regional Council
  - Mayor of Upper Hutt: Peri Zee
  - Remutaka MP: Chris Hipkins
  - Ikaroa-Rāwhiti MP: Cushla Tangaere-Manuel

Area
  - Total: 1.15 km^{2} (0.44 sq mi)

Population (June 2025)
  - Total: 2,400
  - Density: 2,100/km^{2} (5,400/sq mi)

Clouston Park is a suburb of Upper Hutt in the Wellington Region of New Zealand, located 0.5–2.5 km east-northeast from the city centre. It was predominantly developed in the 1970s and 1980s. While the suburb is predominantly flat, there are a few larger homes situated on the lower slopes of the Eastern Hutt Valley Hills that offer wide views of the Upper Hutt Valley.

Clouston Park can be accessed from SH2 by exiting at either Totara Park Road or Mangaroa Hill Road. It is bordered by Ebdentown to the west (Henry Street onwards), Totara Park to the north (by crossing SH2 at Totara Park Road) and Maoribank to the northeast (by crossing Mangaroa Hill Road).

Clouston Park has two small shopping centres, situated on Clouston Park Road and Fergusson Drive. There is also a light industrial area located on Montgomery Crescent and Mountbatten Grove.

== Parks ==
There are three public parks in Clouston Park:

- Doris Nicholson Park: Located off of Fergusson Drive and McHattie Lane
- Benge Park: Primarily located at the end of Rosina Street (has access points from three other streets), it contains a small playground.
- Maoribank Park: Accessed from Clouston Park Road, this larger park has a sports field used by many schools and local sports teams on weekends, as well as hosting the Rimutaka Rugby Football Club.

== Public transport ==
Clouston Park is serviced by the Emerald Hill - Petone and Te Marua commuter bus routes (#110 and #112), operated by Metlink.

== Demographics ==
Clouston Park statistical area covers 1.15 km^{2} (0.44 sq mi). It had an estimated population of 2,400 as of June 2025, with a population density of 2,087 people per km^{2}.

Historical population
Year	Pop.	±% p.a.
2006	2,082	—
2013	2,076	−0.04%
2018	2,289	+1.97%
2023	2,343	+0.47%

Clouston Park had a population of 2,343 in the 2023 New Zealand census, an increase of 54 people (2.4%) since the 2018 census, and an increase of 267 people (12.9%) since the 2013 census. There were 1,149 males, 1,188 females, and 6 people of other genders in 876 dwellings. 3.2% of people identified as LGBTIQ+. The median age was 37.6 years (compared with 38.1 years nationally). There were 465 people (19.8%) aged under 15 years, 450 (19.2%) aged 15 to 29, 1,047 (44.7%) aged 30 to 64, and 387 (16.5%) aged 65 or older.

People could identify as more than one ethnicity. The results were 78.5% European (Pākehā); 19.7% Māori; 9.7% Pasifika; 8.8% Asian; 1.0% Middle Eastern, Latin American and African New Zealanders (MELAA); and 2.3% other, which includes people giving their ethnicity as "New Zealander". English was spoken by 96.3%, Māori by 3.3%, Samoan by 2.3%, and other languages by 11.0%. No language could be spoken by 2.3% (e.g. too young to talk). New Zealand Sign Language was known by 0.8%. The percentage of people born overseas was 19.5, compared with 28.8% nationally.

Religious affiliations were 35.1% Christian, 0.8% Hindu, 0.3% Islam, 0.8% Māori religious beliefs, 0.6% Buddhist, 0.4% New Age, 0.1% Jewish, and 1.5% other religions. People who answered that they had no religion were 52.9%, and 7.8% of people did not answer the census question.

Of those at least 15 years old, 330 (17.6%) people had a bachelor's or higher degree, 1,068 (56.9%) had a post-high school certificate or diploma, and 483 (25.7%) people exclusively held high school qualifications. The median income was $44,400, compared with $41,500 nationally. 195 people (10.4%) earned over $100,000 compared to 12.1% nationally. The employment status of those at least 15 was 1,014 (54.0%) full-time, 201 (10.7%) part-time, and 60 (3.2%) unemployed.
