= James Brown (settler) =

Early settler of Upper Hutt, New Zealand

- Born: c. 1809; Paisley, Renfrewshire, Scotland
- Died: 26 February 1871; Upper Hutt, New Zealand
- Occupations: Weaver, publican
- Known for: Early settlement of Upper Hutt; Criterion Hotel

James Brown (c. 1809 – 26 February 1871) was a Scottish-born New Zealand settler and publican. A former weaver of Paisley, he was one of the earliest European settlers of Upper Hutt, in New Zealand, establishing the district's first hotel, the Halfway House, in 1849.

== Early life ==
Brown was from Paisley, Renfrewshire, where he worked as a weaver.

== Emigration to New Zealand ==
In 1840, James Brown and his family emigrated to New Zealand aboard the Blenheim. Commanded by Captain John Grey, the ship departed from the Tail of the Bank at Greenock on 25 August 1840. It had originally been intended to carry entirely Highland Scottish emigrants, but shortly before the departure, around 40 passengers withdrew. Contemporary reports state that their places were filled by families from Glasgow and Paisley, mostly weavers, blacksmiths, carpenters and other artisans.:

The ship arrived at Port Nicholson on 27 December 1840, landing at Kaiwharawhara.

The family was initially housed in a raupō dwelling by the New Zealand Company. The family subsequently moved to the Lower Hutt valley at Alicetown and Belmont, where Brown built roads, cut timber and carted goods.

=== Settlement of Upper Hutt ===
In 1847, the Brown family moved further up the Hutt Valley, becoming one of the earliest families to permanently settle in the Upper Hutt district. Brown settled in the area which later became Upper Hutt Central, further up the valley from the Barton family in Trentham. The land was formally obtained in 1853.

At the time, the journey through the Taitā and Silverstream gorge was unsuitable for wheeled traffic, requiring Brown's dray to be dismantled and carried on poles to Silverstream with the assistance of other settlers, before being reassembled. The family lived in a tent of sailcloth for six months, building a weatherboard house once the bush had been cleared.

=== Hotelkeeper ===
Brown established Upper Hutt's first hotel, the "Halfway House", in 1849 at the present-day intersection of Main Street and Russell Street to provide accommodation for travellers between Wellington and the Wairarapa. It was the first commercial building in the modern-day location of Upper Hutt. In an advertisement dated 5 June 1849, he promoted the hotel and announced plans to provide "stabling and good paddocks for stock".

The Criterion Hotel, Upper Hutt, during the Dalton family's proprietorship, c. 1880s.

Later renamed the "Shepherd's Inn" and finally the "Criterion Hotel" in 1859, the hotel became an important centre in the early development of Upper Hutt.

In October 1867, James Brown instructed the auctioneering firm W. Hickson & Son to offer the Criterion Hotel for sale by public auction. The contemporary advertisement describes the hotel as containing 13 bedrooms, three sitting rooms, a dining room, kitchen and outbuildings, together with three stables containing 22 stalls. The property comprised 20 acres of cleared land, and the government pound was on the land. The property was sold to John Martin for £900.

During his tour of New Zealand, Prince Alfred, Duke of Edinburgh, stopped at the Criterion Hotel on 13 April 1869 for refreshments. Later that day, after the Duke had returned to Wellington, the hotel's original stables were destroyed by fire.

== Family ==
On 21 January 1831, James Brown married Mary Catherine Flynn, who was born in County Wicklow, Ireland. Together, they had six known children

- Sarah Brown (Paisley, c. 1831 – 1912) married James Wilson.
- James Brown (Paisley)
- George Brown (Paisley, b. 1835) was a prominent Upper Hutt farmer, serving as chairman of the Hutt County Council.
- Elizabeth Brown (Paisley, c. 1839 – 1929), later Elizabeth Martin, was the youngest passenger aboard the Blenheim at 20 months old.
- David Brown (Lower Hutt)
- Andrew Brown (Lower Hutt, b. 1846)

== Death and burial ==
James Brown died at Upper Hutt on 26 February 1871 after a "severe and protracted illness", according to the Wellington Independent. Brown was one of the first to be buried in the cemetery at St Joseph's Catholic Church, Upper Hutt, and his wife was buried alongside him.

== Legacy ==
Brown's property and businesses played an important role in the development of central Upper Hutt. The Halfway House, later the Criterion Hotel, was the first commercial site on Main Street, Upper Hutt and was one of the earliest central points of settlement in the area.

After Brown's death, his family donated approximately 30 acres of land for the establishment of the Upper Hutt railway station. The railway reached Upper Hutt in February 1876, and the location of the station near the former Criterion Hotel led to the movement of Upper Hutt's commercial centre away from the earlier businesses around Fortune Lane to its modern-day location.

Brown and his family were described as the first Catholic residents of the Upper Hutt district. James Brown's wife, Mary Catherine Flynn, who was Irish Catholic, was prominent in the establishment of St Joseph's Catholic Church in Upper Hutt, which opened in 1864 on Pine Avenue in Upper Hutt. The church was the original location of Upper Hutt School, before its relocation to another site in Trentham. The building was demolished and replaced in 1961.

A commemorative plaque lies near the intersection of Main Street and Russell Street in Upper Hutt, marking the site of the original homestead of the Brown family. Another nearby plaque marks the site where James Brown established Halfway House in 1849.
