= Timberlea =

Timberlea may refer to:

- Timberlea, New Zealand
- Timberlea, Nova Scotia, a community in Halifax
- Timberlea, Ontario, a community in Milton
