= Parkvale, New Zealand =

Parkvale can refer to multiple localities in New Zealand:

- Parkvale, Hastings, a suburb of Hastings
- Parkvale, Tauranga, a suburb of Tauranga
- Parkvale, Wellington, a locality in Carterton District

Not to be confused with:

- Parkdale, New Zealand
