= Elderslea =

Suburb of Upper Hutt City, New Zealand

- Suburb
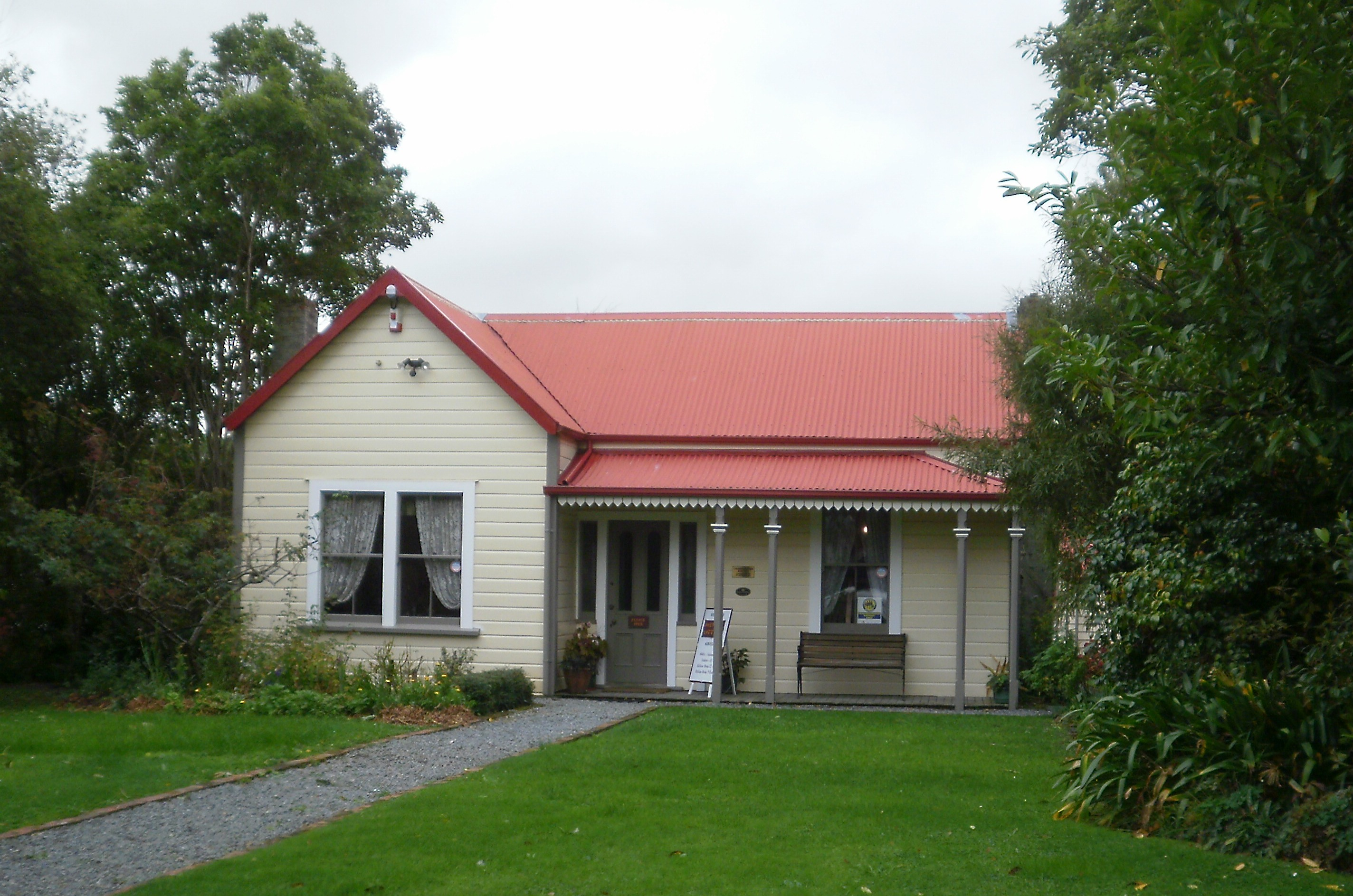
- Golder Cottage, a museum of colonial domestic life
- Interactive map of Elderslea
- Coordinates: 41.1232°S 175.0576°E
- Country: New Zealand
- Region: Wellington Region
- Territorial authority: Upper Hutt
- Electorates: Remutaka; Ikaroa-Rāwhiti (Māori)

Government
  - Territorial Authority: Upper Hutt City Council
  - Regional council: Greater Wellington Regional Council
  - Mayor of Upper Hutt: Peri Zee
  - Remutaka MP: Chris Hipkins
  - Ikaroa-Rāwhiti MP: Cushla Tangaere-Manuel

Area
  - Total: 1.40 km^{2} (0.54 sq mi)

Population (June 2025)
  - Total: 3,310
  - Density: 2,360/km^{2} (6,120/sq mi)

Elderslea is a suburb of Upper Hutt located in the lower North Island of New Zealand, near Upper Hutt Central.

== Demographics ==
Elderslea statistical area covers 1.40 km^{2} (0.54 sq mi). It had an estimated population of 3,310 as of June 2025, with a population density of 2,364 people per km^{2}.

Historical population
Year	Pop.	±% p.a.
2006	3,183	—
2013	3,225	+0.19%
2018	3,429	+1.23%
2023	3,294	−0.80%

Elderslea had a population of 3,294 in the 2023 New Zealand census, a decrease of 135 people (−3.9%) since the 2018 census, and an increase of 69 people (2.1%) since the 2013 census. There were 1,599 males, 1,686 females, and 12 people of other genders in 1,242 dwellings. 3.6% of people identified as LGBTIQ+. The median age was 41.0 years (compared with 38.1 years nationally). There were 600 people (18.2%) aged under 15 years, 546 (16.6%) aged 15 to 29, 1,401 (42.5%) aged 30 to 64, and 747 (22.7%) aged 65 or older.

People could identify as more than one ethnicity. The results were 76.0% European (Pākehā); 20.0% Māori; 8.9% Pasifika; 11.7% Asian; 1.2% Middle Eastern, Latin American and African New Zealanders (MELAA); and 2.3% other, which includes people giving their ethnicity as "New Zealander". English was spoken by 96.6%, Māori by 3.7%, Samoan by 2.1%, and other languages by 12.2%. No language could be spoken by 1.9% (e.g. too young to talk). New Zealand Sign Language was known by 0.6%. The percentage of people born overseas was 21.6, compared with 28.8% nationally.

Religious affiliations were 34.9% Christian, 2.7% Hindu, 0.5% Islam, 1.1% Māori religious beliefs, 1.2% Buddhist, 1.0% New Age, and 1.6% other religions. People who answered that they had no religion were 50.6%, and 6.4% of people did not answer the census question.

Of those at least 15 years old, 468 (17.4%) people had a bachelor's or higher degree, 1,482 (55.0%) had a post-high school certificate or diploma, and 744 (27.6%) people exclusively held high school qualifications. The median income was $38,200, compared with $41,500 nationally. 270 people (10.0%) earned over $100,000 compared to 12.1% nationally. The employment status of those at least 15 was 1,299 (48.2%) full-time, 321 (11.9%) part-time, and 63 (2.3%) unemployed.

== Education ==
Fraser Crescent School is a state primary school for Year 1 to 6 students, with a roll of 291. It opened in 1956.

Maidstone Intermediate, also called Te Kura ō Hinepōhatu, is a state intermediate school for Year 7 to Year 8 students, with a roll of 556. It opened in 1970.

Both schools are co-educational. Rolls are as of July 2026.
