= Ebdentown =

Suburb of Upper Hutt, New Zealand

- Suburb
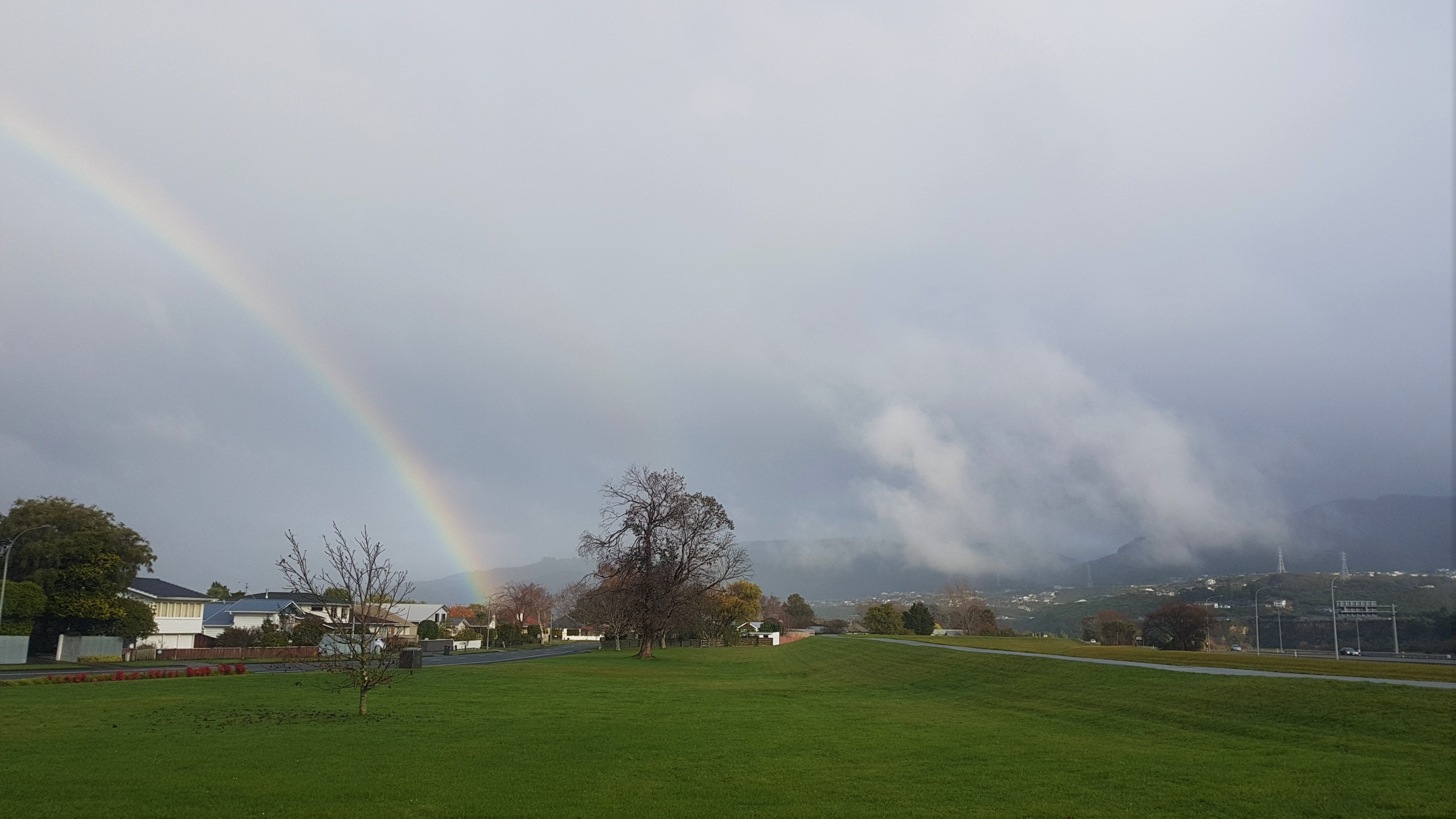
- River Road shared path at Ebdentown
- Interactive map of Ebdentown
- Coordinates: 41.1196°S 175.0769°E
- Country: New Zealand
- Region: Wellington Region
- Territorial authority: Upper Hutt
- Electorates: Remutaka; Ikaroa-Rāwhiti (Māori)

Government
  - Territorial Authority: Upper Hutt City Council
  - Regional council: Greater Wellington Regional Council
  - Mayor of Upper Hutt: Peri Zee
  - Remutaka MP: Chris Hipkins
  - Ikaroa-Rāwhiti MP: Cushla Tangaere-Manuel

Area
  - Total: 0.91 km^{2} (0.35 sq mi)

Population (June 2025)
  - Total: 2,570
  - Density: 2,800/km^{2} (7,300/sq mi)
- Time zone: NZST
  - Summer (DST): NZDT
- NZ Post code: 5018

Ebdentown, a suburb of Upper Hutt located in the lower North Island of New Zealand, near Upper Hutt Central.

== Demographics ==
Ebdentown statistical area covers 0.91 km^{2} (0.35 sq mi). It had an estimated population of 2,570 as of June 2025, with a population density of 2,824 people per km^{2}.

Historical population
Year	Pop.	±% p.a.
2006	2,352	—
2013	2,349	−0.02%
2018	2,481	+1.10%
2023	2,523	+0.34%

Ebdentown had a population of 2,523 in the 2023 New Zealand census, an increase of 42 people (1.7%) since the 2018 census, and an increase of 174 people (7.4%) since the 2013 census. There were 1,242 males, 1,272 females, and 9 people of other genders in 1,050 dwellings. 4.0% of people identified as LGBTIQ+. The median age was 41.0 years (compared with 38.1 years nationally). There were 441 people (17.5%) aged under 15 years, 399 (15.8%) aged 15 to 29, 1,173 (46.5%) aged 30 to 64, and 513 (20.3%) aged 65 or older.

People could identify as more than one ethnicity. The results were 76.0% European (Pākehā); 18.2% Māori; 6.7% Pasifika; 13.3% Asian; 1.2% Middle Eastern, Latin American and African New Zealanders (MELAA); and 2.4% other, which includes people giving their ethnicity as "New Zealander". English was spoken by 96.4%, Māori by 3.7%, Samoan by 1.9%, and other languages by 13.2%. No language could be spoken by 2.1% (e.g. too young to talk). New Zealand Sign Language was known by 0.6%. The percentage of people born overseas was 23.3, compared with 28.8% nationally.

Religious affiliations were 35.1% Christian, 3.1% Hindu, 0.5% Islam, 1.4% Māori religious beliefs, 1.0% Buddhist, 0.7% New Age, and 2.1% other religions. People who answered that they had no religion were 49.5%, and 6.8% of people did not answer the census question.

Of those at least 15 years old, 426 (20.5%) people had a bachelor's or higher degree, 1,095 (52.6%) had a post-high school certificate or diploma, and 561 (26.9%) people exclusively held high school qualifications. The median income was $39,800, compared with $41,500 nationally. 216 people (10.4%) earned over $100,000 compared to 12.1% nationally. The employment status of those at least 15 was 1,056 (50.7%) full-time, 231 (11.1%) part-time, and 48 (2.3%) unemployed.

== Education ==
Oxford Crescent School is a co-educational state primary school for Year 1 to 6 students, with a roll of 386 as of July 2026. It opened in 1953.
