= Upper Hutt =

City in Wellington Region, New Zealand

Upper Hutt Te Awa Kairangi ki Uta (Māori)
- City
- Upper Hutt City
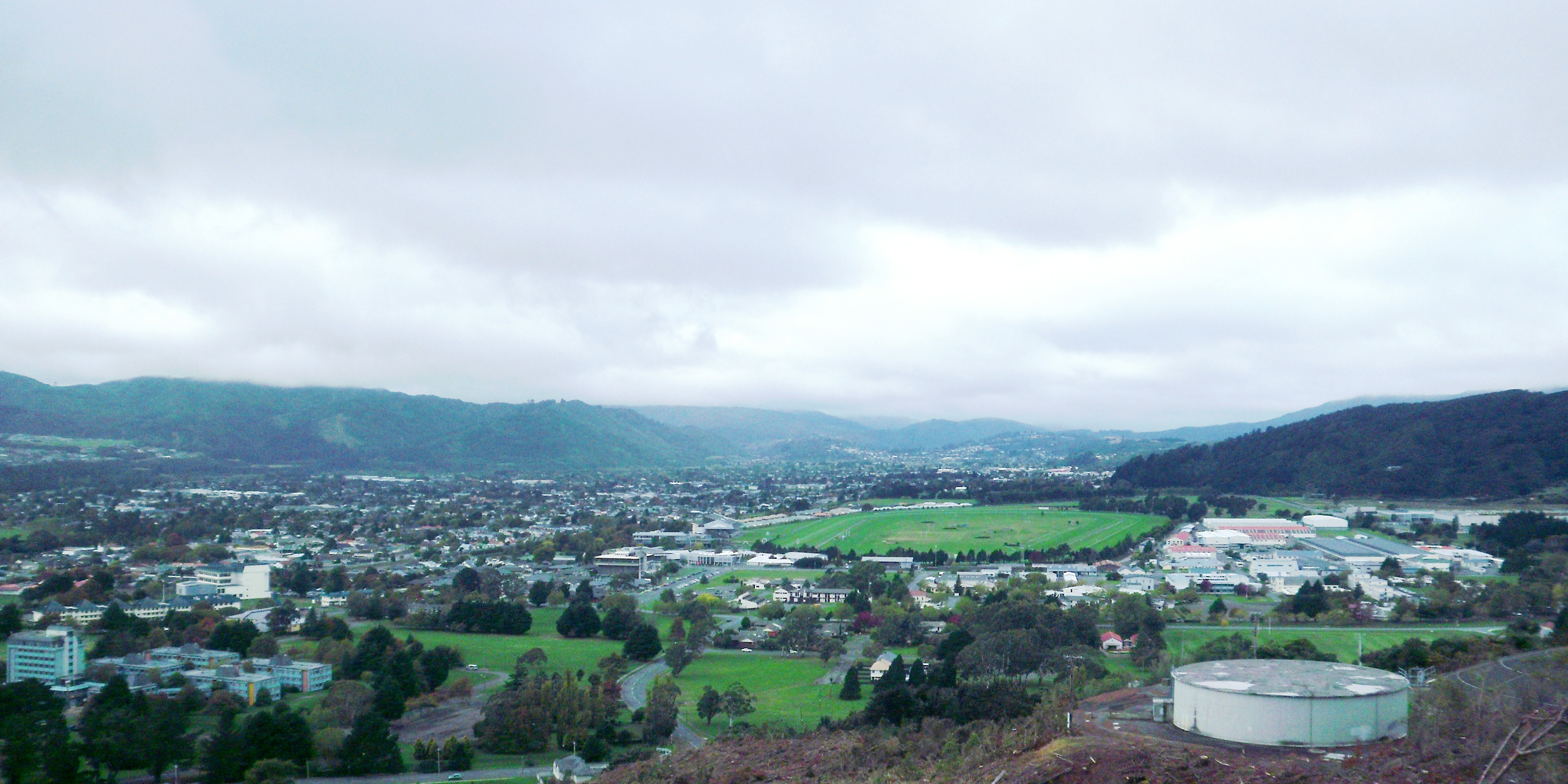
- Upper Hutt, view towards city centre.

- Flag Coat of arms
- Motto: Nihil altius pulchriusue (Nothing higher nor more beautiful)
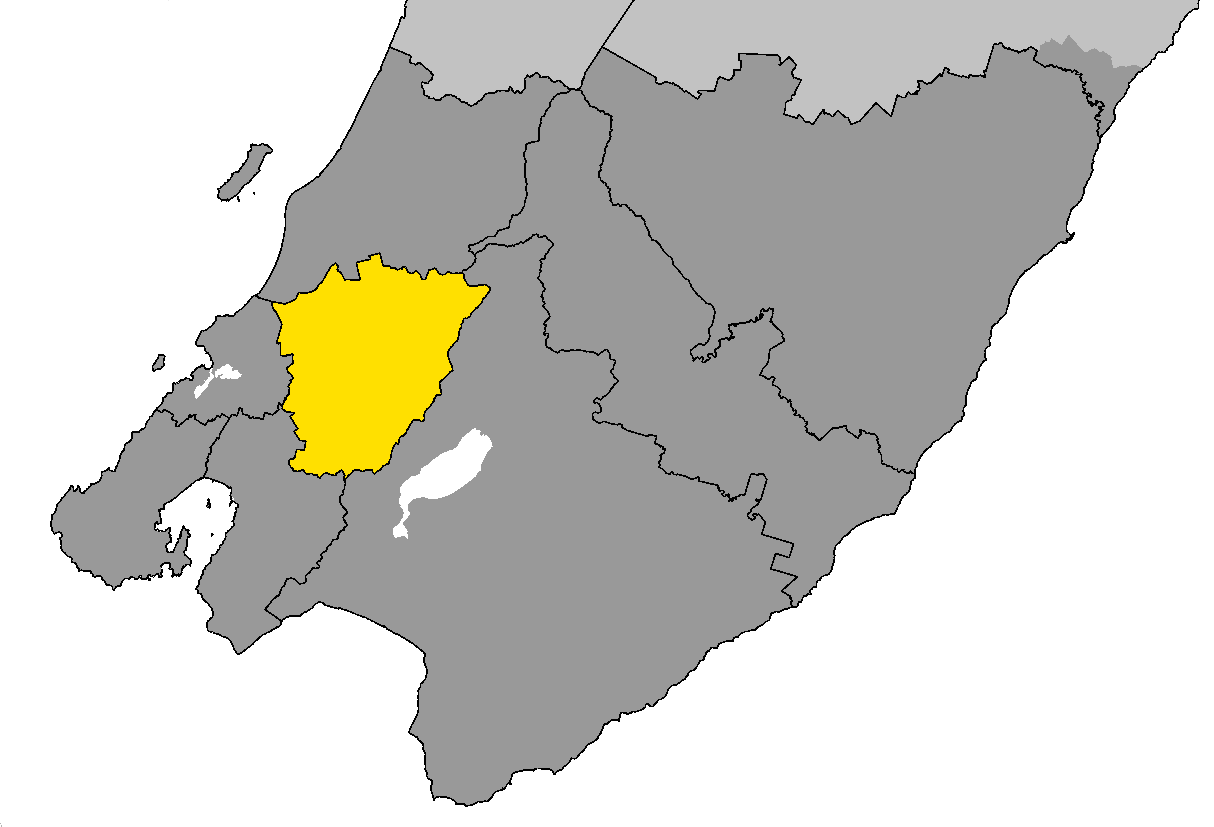
- The location of Upper Hutt City within Wellington Region
- Coordinates: 41°08′00″S 175°03′00″E
- Country: New Zealand
- Region: Wellington
- Territorial Authority: Upper Hutt City
- City status: 1966
- Borough status: 1926
- Town Board: 1908
- Electorates: Remutaka (general); Kapiti (general); Ikaroa-Rāwhiti (Māori); Te Tai Hauāuru (Māori)
- Suburbs: List: Te Mārua; Akatarawa; Remutaka; Parkdale; Emerald Hill; Birchville; Timberlea; Brown Owl; Kaitoke; Maoribank; Upper Hutt Central; Clouston Park; Mangaroa; Maymorn; Whitemans Valley; Tōtara Park; Kingsley Heights; Elderslea, Wallaceville; Trentham; Heretaunga; Riverstone Terraces; Silverstream; Pinehaven

Government
  - Type: City Council
  - Mayor: Peri Zee
  - Territorial authority: Upper Hutt City Council
  - MPs: Chris Hipkins (New Zealand Labour Party); Tim Costley (New Zealand National Party); Cushla Tangaere-Manuel (New Zealand Labour Party); Debbie Ngarewa-Packer (Te Pāti Māori)

Area
  - Territorial: 539.88 km^{2} (208.45 sq mi)
  - Urban: 51.16 km^{2} (19.75 sq mi)
  - Rural: 488.72 km^{2} (188.70 sq mi)

Population (June 2025)
  - Territorial: 47,400
  - Density: 87.8/km^{2} (227/sq mi)
  - Urban: 44,500
  - Urban density: 870/km^{2} (2,250/sq mi)
- Time zone: UTC+12 (NZST)
  - Summer (DST): UTC+13 (NZDT)
- Postcode: 5018, 5019
- Area code: 04
- Website: www.upperhutt.govt.nz

Upper Hutt (Māori: Te Awa Kairangi ki Uta) is a city in the Wellington Region of New Zealand and one of the four cities that constitute the Wellington metropolitan area.

== History ==
Upper Hutt is in an area originally known as Orongomai and that of the river was Heretaunga (today the name of a suburb of Upper Hutt). The first residents of the area were Māori of the Ngāi Tara iwi. Various other iwi controlled the area in the years before 1840, and by the time the first colonial settlers arrived the area was part of the Te Āti awa rohe.

In 1839, the English colonising company, The New Zealand Company made a purchase from Māori chiefs of about 160,000 acres of land in the Wellington region including Upper Hutt. The Hutt Valley is named after one of the founders of this company. Dealings from the New Zealand Company and following that, the Crown (after the Treaty of Waitangi in 1840), with local Māori regarding the land in Upper Hutt were flawed including not transacting with all the iwi that had claims on the land. Disputes arose and there were skirmishes and warfare in the Hutt Valley in 1846 between troops under Governor George Grey and Māori including chiefs Te Rauparaha, Te Rangihaeata, Te Mamaku and iwi including Ngāti Toa, Ngāti Rangatahi, Ngāti Tama and Ngāti Hāua-te-rangi.

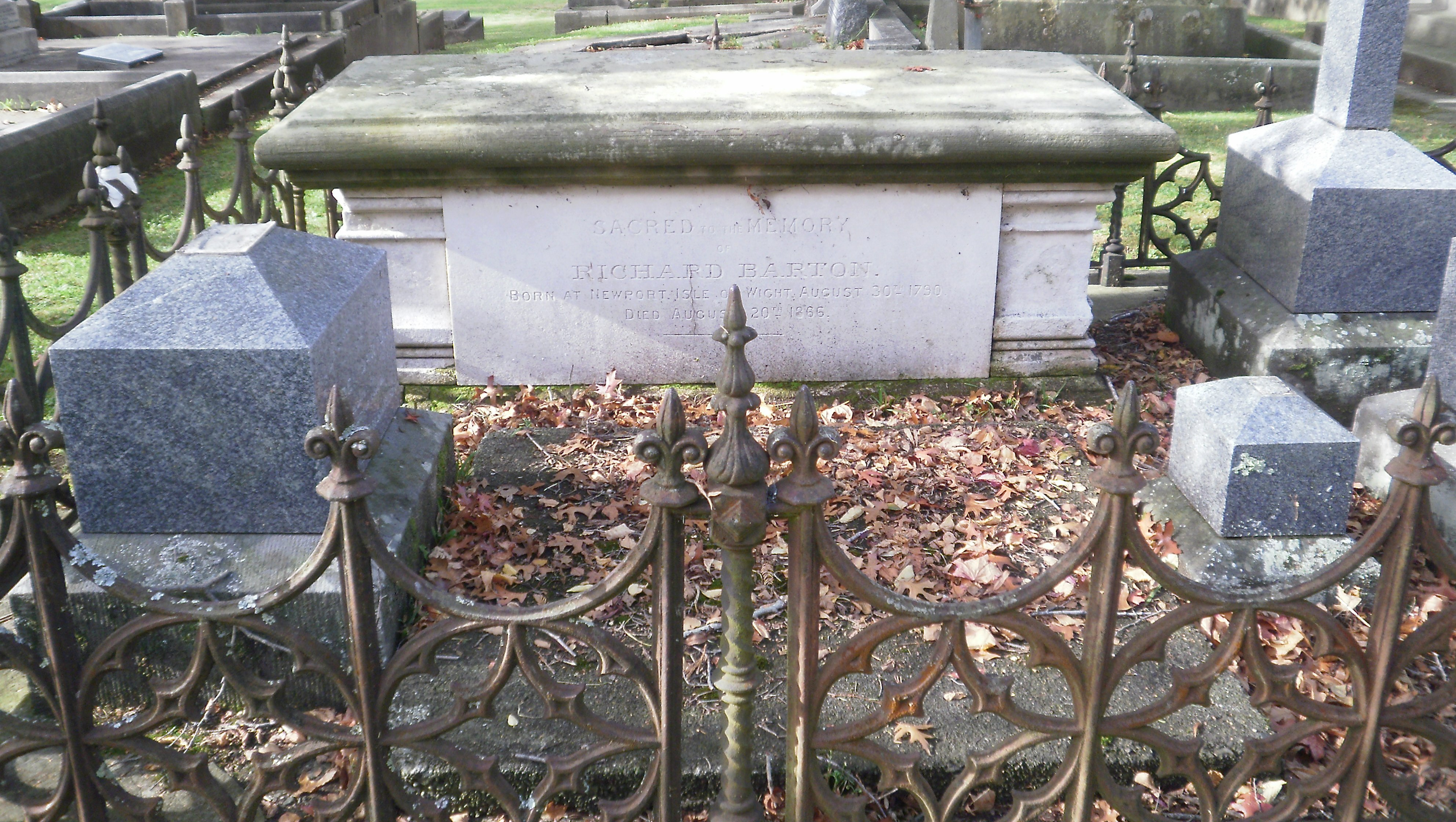
The grave of Upper Hutt's first European settler, Richard Barton.

Richard Barton, who settled at Trentham in 1841 in the area now known as Trentham Memorial Park, was the first European resident. Barton subsequently subdivided his land and set aside a large area that was turned into parkland. James Brown settled in the area that became the Upper Hutt town in 1848.

Having divided the land into 100 acre block, the settlers set about clearing the land of its indigenous forest and turning it into farmland. Sawmillers milled larger trees, such as Totara, for building materials and burned off the remaining scrub and underbrush.

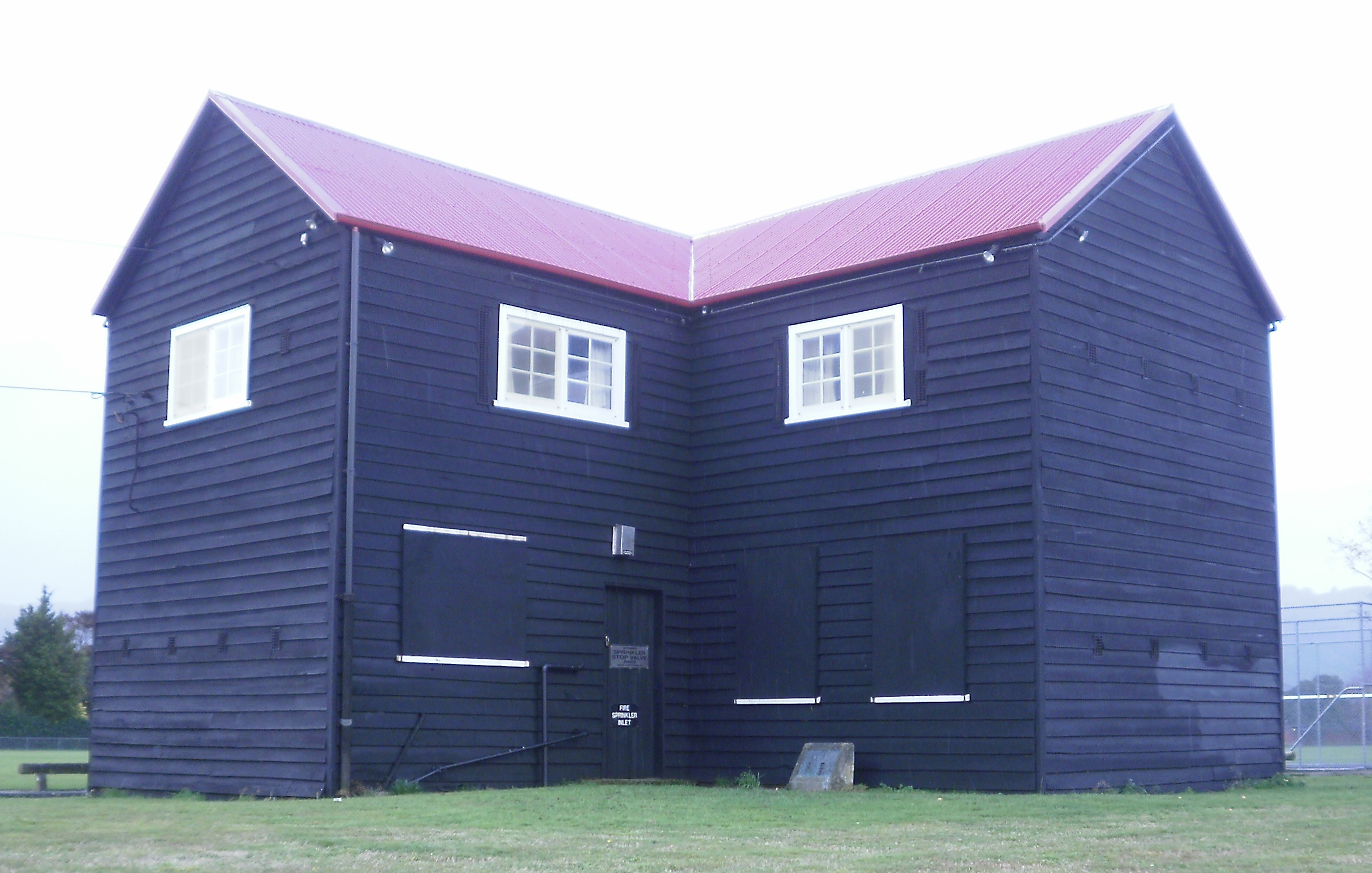
Upper Hutt Blockhouse was built as part of a stockade in 1860, during the New Zealand Wars.

Alarmed by unrest in Taranaki and sightings of local Māori bearing arms, settlers in the Hutt Valley lobbied for the construction of fortifications in Upper and Lower Hutt. The government and the military responded by constructing 2 stockades in the Hutt Valley in 1860. While the stockade in Upper Hutt was manned for 6 months, the threat of hostilities soon passed and neither installation ever saw hostile action.

The railway line from Wellington reached Upper Hutt on 1 February 1876. The line was extended to Kaitoke at the top end of the valley, reaching there on 1 January 1878. The line continued over the Remutaka Ranges to Featherston in the Wairarapa as a Fell railway, opening on 12 October 1878.

By the beginning of March 1914, the area of Upper Hutt controlled by the Upper Hutt Town Board had its own water supply. The supply capacity was increased when the Birchville Dam was built in 1930. Completed in early 1931.

On the evening of 28 March 1914, fire broke out at the Benge and Pratt store in Main Street. An explosion killed 8 of the volunteers fighting the fire and destroyed the building.

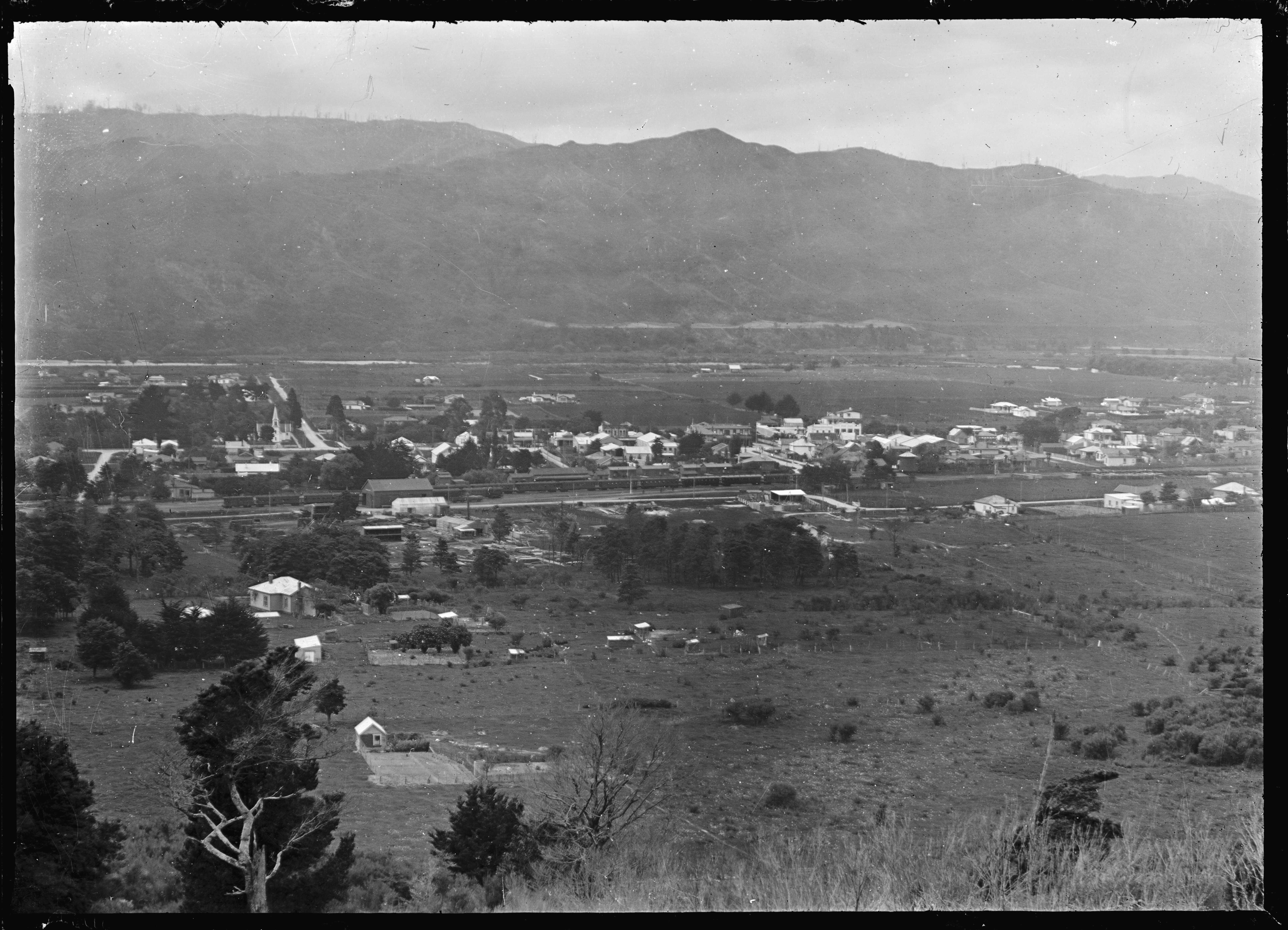
View of Upper Hutt from Wallaceville Hill, 1924

For many years, Upper Hutt was a rural service town, supporting the surrounding rural farming and forestry community. Serious urbanisation of the upper Hutt Valley only started around the 1920s, but from the late 1940s onwards, Upper Hutt's population exploded as people moved from the crowded hustle and bustle of inner-city Wellington into a more secluded yet sprawling Hutt Valley. In 1950, Trentham Memorial Park was created with an area of almost 50 hectares.

Upper Hutt continued to grow in population and became a city within the Wellington metropolitan area on 2 May 1966 after the Government Statistician certified that the population had reached 20 000, allowing the Town Clerk to make an application for city status.

On 9 April 1976, Upper Hutt became the first area in New Zealand to implement subscriber toll dialling (STD), allowing telephone subscribers to make national calls without operator assistance.

Ōrongomai Marae is to the south of the modern city centre. The pan-tribal Ōrongomai Marae officially opened in 1976; the meeting house Kahukura, with its carvings representing New Zealand's major tribal areas and some Pacific Islands, opened in May 1989.

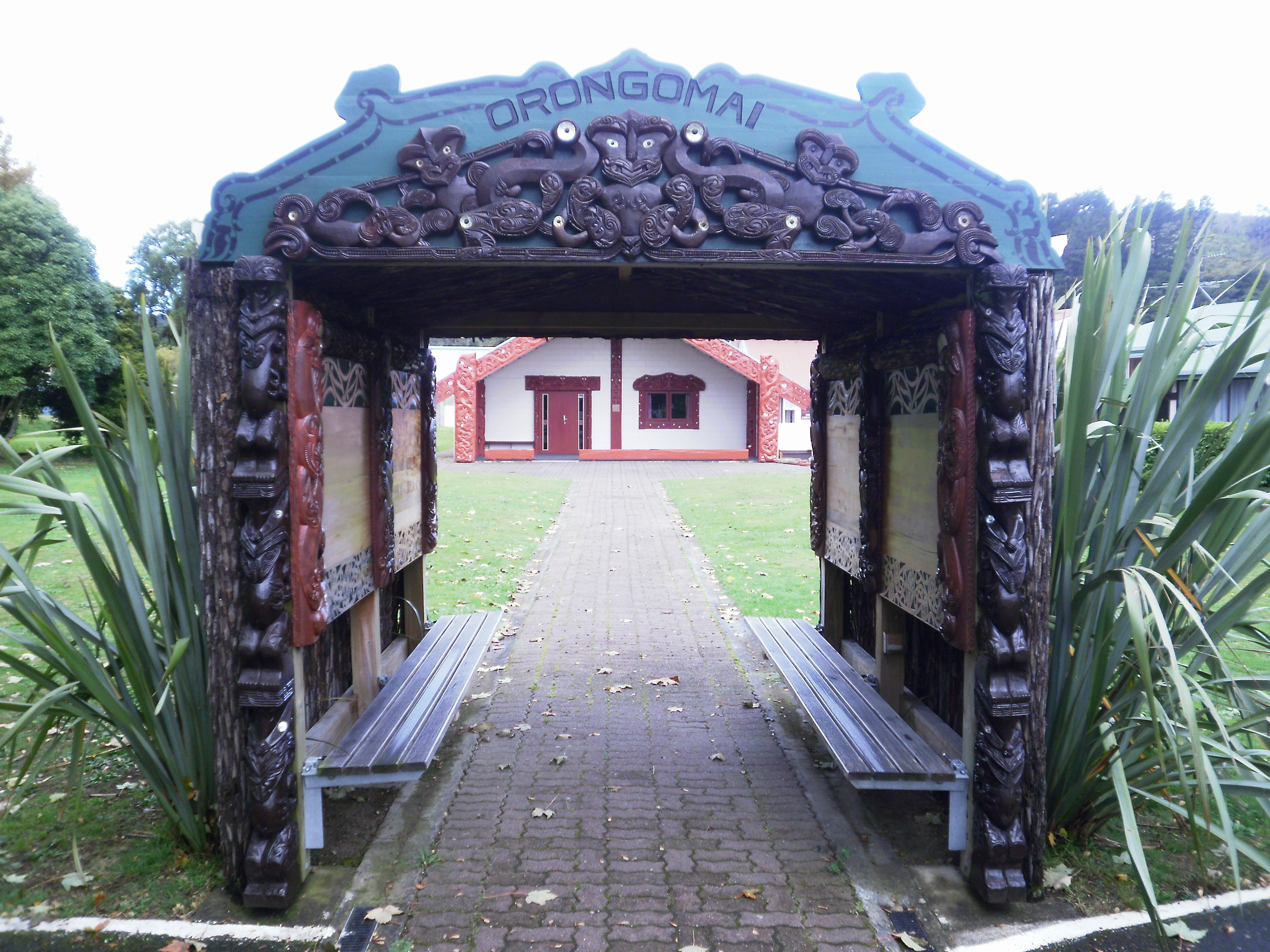
Orongomai Marae is named after the Māori name for the area, meaning place of Rongomai.

Residential subdivision in areas such as Clouston Park, Maoribank, Tōtara Park and Kingsley Heights continued into the 1980s.

In February 1979 Muhammed Ali came to New Zealand, staying at Upper Hutt.

=== Historic places ===
There are twelve historic sites within Upper Hutt included on the Heritage New Zealand list of historic places, including four Category 1 sites, seven Category 2 sites, and one historic area. The historic area, the Remutaka Incline Rail Trail, crosses into part of neighbouring South Wairarapa District.

== Geography ==
The Upper Hutt city centre lies approximately 26 km north-east of Wellington. While the main areas of urban development lie along the Te Awa Kairangi / Hutt River valley floor, the city extends to the top of the Remutaka Pass to the north-east and into the Akatarawa Valley and rough hill-country of the Akatarawa ranges to the north and north-west, almost reaching the Kāpiti Coast close to Paekākāriki.

Upper Hutt is in the bed of an ancient river flood plain and as such was prone to flooding. In the 1970s and 1980s, a stop bank was built alongside the eastern side of the river from northern Upper Hutt to the mouth of Te Awa Kairangi / Hutt River in Lower Hutt to prevent further flooding. Centred on the upper (northern) valley of Te Awa Kairangi / Hutt River, which flows north-east to south-west on its way to Wellington harbour, the flat land widens briefly into a 2500-m-wide floodplain between the Remutaka and Akatarawa Ranges before constricting nine kilometres further downstream at the Taitā Gorge, which separates Upper Hutt from its neighbour, Lower Hutt. The city's main urban area spreads over this plain. A smaller flood plain lies upstream, above the Kaitoke Gorge, but has experienced little urban development.

=== Climate ===
Upper Hutt has a temperate climate however due to its sheltered valley location, it generally tends to be warmer than inner city Wellington in the summer and much colder in the winter. It is not uncommon in summer for temperatures to reach the high-20s Celsius (+/- 82 °F), and in winter, the temperature to drop to as low as −5 °C (about 23 °F) with regular and often heavy frost. Snow generally doesn't fall below 300 m, but in 2011 Upper Hutt sea level snow occurred twice, as part of 2011 New Zealand snowstorms. On 25 July and again between 14 and 16 August, which was the heaviest blizzard in Upper Hutt since 1976 and came as a great novelty to residents. Upper Hutt receives about 1400 mm of rain per year. At 17.5 °C on average, February is the warmest month, while July is the coldest at 8.5 °C.

Climate data for Upper Hutt (1991–2020 normals, extremes 1939–present)
Month	Jan	Feb	Mar	Apr	May	Jun	Jul	Aug	Sep	Oct	Nov	Dec	Year
Record high °C (°F)	33.5 (92.3)	31.0 (87.8)	30.8 (87.4)	26.6 (79.9)	23.3 (73.9)	20.2 (68.4)	19.5 (67.1)	20.5 (68.9)	23.1 (73.6)	25.9 (78.6)	27.4 (81.3)	29.3 (84.7)	33.5 (92.3)
Mean daily maximum °C (°F)	22.2 (72.0)	22.3 (72.1)	20.6 (69.1)	17.8 (64.0)	15.5 (59.9)	12.9 (55.2)	12.4 (54.3)	13.0 (55.4)	14.3 (57.7)	16.1 (61.0)	17.8 (64.0)	20.1 (68.2)	17.1 (62.7)
Daily mean °C (°F)	17.1 (62.8)	17.0 (62.6)	15.2 (59.4)	12.7 (54.9)	10.8 (51.4)	8.2 (46.8)	7.5 (45.5)	8.3 (46.9)	10.0 (50.0)	11.6 (52.9)	13.3 (55.9)	15.6 (60.1)	12.3 (54.1)
Mean daily minimum °C (°F)	12.1 (53.8)	11.6 (52.9)	9.7 (49.5)	7.6 (45.7)	6.1 (43.0)	3.5 (38.3)	2.7 (36.9)	3.6 (38.5)	5.7 (42.3)	7.2 (45.0)	8.7 (47.7)	11.0 (51.8)	7.5 (45.4)
Record low °C (°F)	0.6 (33.1)	0.9 (33.6)	−1.5 (29.3)	−3.1 (26.4)	−4.9 (23.2)	−7.2 (19.0)	−6.1 (21.0)	−6.7 (19.9)	−5.5 (22.1)	−4.6 (23.7)	−1.5 (29.3)	−0.3 (31.5)	−7.2 (19.0)
Average rainfall mm (inches)	50.9 (2.00)	71.0 (2.80)	69.4 (2.73)	106.6 (4.20)	133.9 (5.27)	121.5 (4.78)	131.5 (5.18)	110.5 (4.35)	124.3 (4.89)	101.1 (3.98)	132.0 (5.20)	103.2 (4.06)	1,255.9 (49.44)
Source: NIWA

== Government ==
=== Local government ===
Upper Hutt City Council (UHCC) administers the city with its surrounding rural areas, parks and reserves. Its area is 540 km^{2}, the third-largest area of city council in New Zealand, after Dunedin and Auckland. New Zealand local authorities with a large land area are usually termed districts, but Upper Hutt maintains its status as a city largely because of its high degree of urbanisation.

Upper Hutt was originally administered by the Hutt County Council, which was constituted in 1877. The Town Board was proclaimed on 24 April 1908. Upper Hutt became a Borough on 26 February 1926 and a City on 2 May 1966. On 1 April 1973, the Rimutaka Riding of Hutt County was added to the city. When the Hutt County Council was abolished on 1 November 1988, the city took over administration of the Heretaunga/Pinehaven ward, which was incorporated into the city on 1 November 1989 when the Heretaunga/Pinehaven Community Council was abolished.

=== Parliamentary representation ===
Today, Upper Hutt City falls entirely within the boundaries of the Remutaka electorate, currently held by Labour's Chris Hipkins. Upper Hutt was represented by the Heretaunga electorate prior to the introduction of MMP in 1996, when the seat was merged with Eastern Hutt to form Remutaka.

== Demographics ==
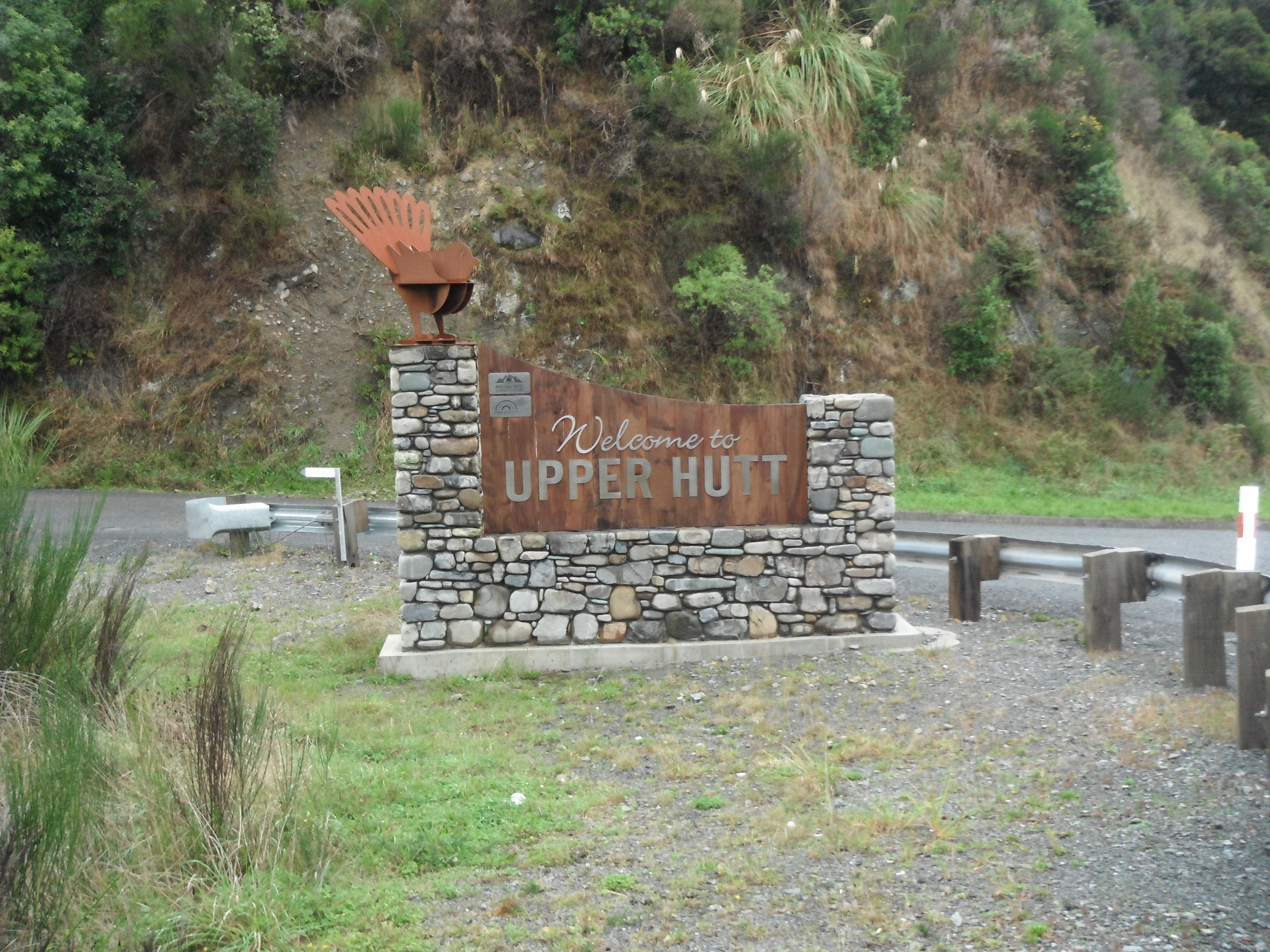
"Welcome to Upper Hutt" sign at Te Mārua, with a wrought iron depiction of a New Zealand fantail.

Upper Hutt City's territory covers 539.88 km^{2} (208.45 sq mi) and had an estimated population of 47,400 as of June 2025, with a population density of 88 people per km^{2}.

Historical population for the territorial area
Year	Pop.	±% p.a.
2006	38,415	—
2013	40,179	+0.64%
2018	43,980	+1.82%
2023	45,759	+0.80%

Upper Hutt City had a population of 45,759 in the 2023 New Zealand census, an increase of 1,779 people (4.0%) since the 2018 census, and an increase of 5,580 people (13.9%) since the 2013 census. There were 22,749 males, 22,803 females and 207 people of other genders in 16,890 dwellings. 3.7% of people identified as LGBTIQ+. The median age was 39.1 years (compared with 38.1 years nationally). There were 8,811 people (19.3%) aged under 15 years, 7,728 (16.9%) aged 15 to 29, 21,900 (47.9%) aged 30 to 64, and 7,317 (16.0%) aged 65 or older.

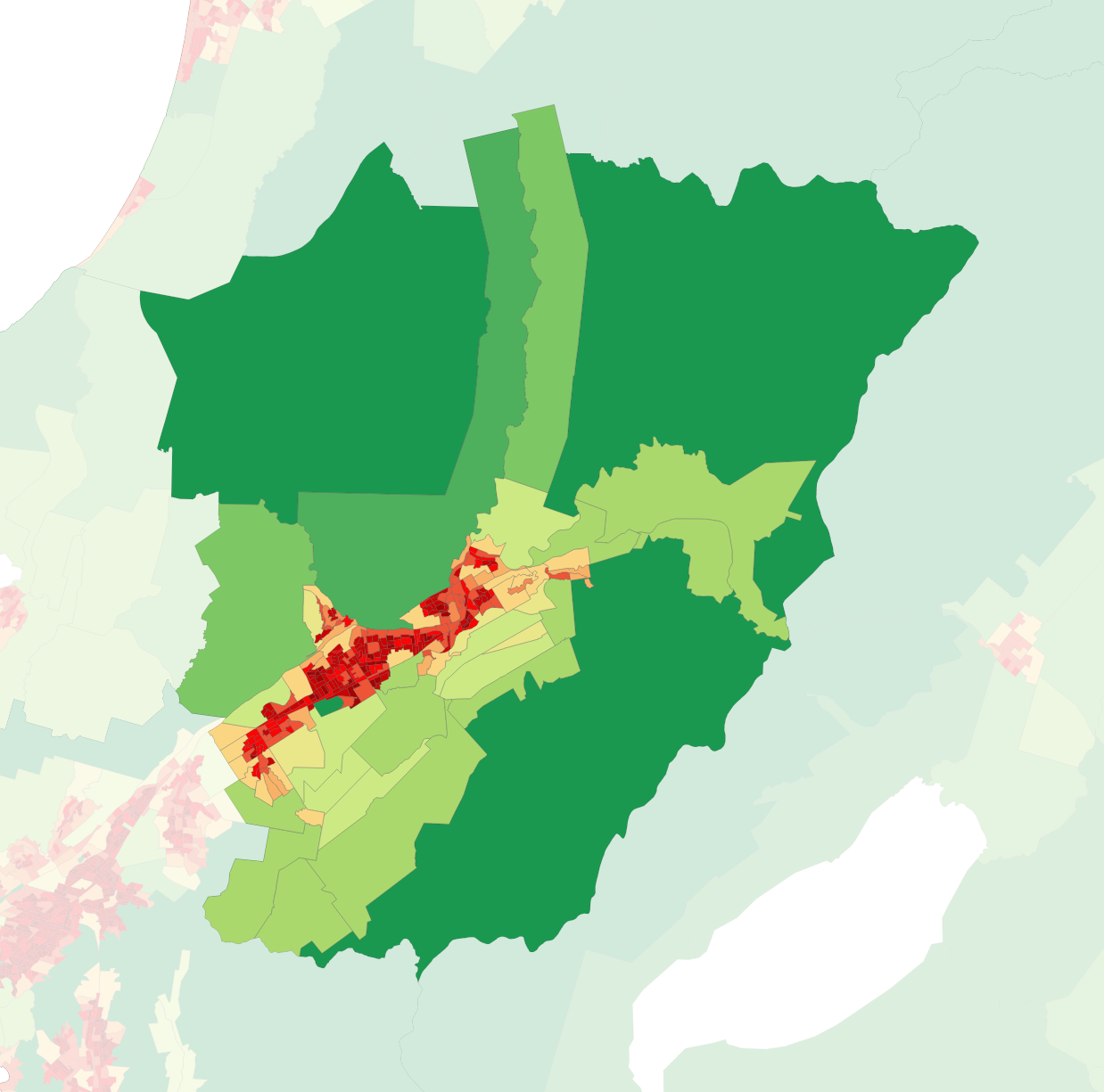
Population density in the 2023 census

People could identify as more than one ethnicity. The results were 78.4% European (Pākehā); 16.7% Māori; 6.5% Pasifika; 11.9% Asian; 1.4% Middle Eastern, Latin American and African New Zealanders (MELAA); and 2.7% other, which includes people giving their ethnicity as "New Zealander". English was spoken by 96.6%, Māori language by 3.4%, Samoan by 1.7% and other languages by 12.7%. No language could be spoken by 2.2% (e.g. too young to talk). New Zealand Sign Language was known by 0.6%. The percentage of people born overseas was 23.3, compared with 28.8% nationally.

Religious affiliations were 33.3% Christian, 2.8% Hindu, 0.6% Islam, 0.9% Māori religious beliefs, 0.8% Buddhist, 0.6% New Age, 0.1% Jewish, and 2.1% other religions. People who answered that they had no religion were 52.2%, and 6.8% of people did not answer the census question.

Of those at least 15 years old, 6,804 (18.4%) people had a bachelor's or higher degree, 20,001 (54.1%) had a post-high school certificate or diploma, and 8,130 (22.0%) people exclusively held high school qualifications. The median income was $48,600, compared with $41,500 nationally. 5,823 people (15.8%) earned over $100,000 compared to 12.1% nationally. The employment status of those at least 15 was that 20,517 (55.5%) people were employed full-time, 4,293 (11.6%) were part-time, and 942 (2.5%) were unemployed.

=== Urban area ===
The urban area of Upper Hutt covers 51.16 km^{2} (19.75 sq mi) and had an estimated population of 44,500 as of June 2025, with a population density of 870 people per km^{2}.

Historical population for the urban area
Year	Pop.	±% p.a.
2013	37,695	—
2018	41,301	+1.84%
2023	42,903	+0.76%

Upper Hutt had a population of 42,903 in the 2023 New Zealand census, an increase of 1,602 people (3.9%) since the 2018 census, and an increase of 5,208 people (13.8%) since the 2013 census. There were 21,321 males, 21,393 females and 192 people of other genders in 15,909 dwellings. 3.7% of people identified as LGBTIQ+. The median age was 38.8 years (compared with 38.1 years nationally). There were 8,316 people (19.4%) aged under 15 years, 7,275 (17.0%) aged 15 to 29, 20,406 (47.6%) aged 30 to 64, and 6,906 (16.1%) aged 65 or older.

People could identify as more than one ethnicity. The results were 77.3% European (Pākehā); 17.1% Māori; 6.9% Pasifika; 12.5% Asian; 1.4% Middle Eastern, Latin American and African New Zealanders (MELAA); and 2.6% other, which includes people giving their ethnicity as "New Zealander". English was spoken by 96.4%, Māori language by 3.5%, Samoan by 1.7% and other languages by 13.0%. No language could be spoken by 2.3% (e.g. too young to talk). New Zealand Sign Language was known by 0.6%. The percentage of people born overseas was 23.5, compared with 28.8% nationally.

Religious affiliations were 33.6% Christian, 3.0% Hindu, 0.6% Islam, 0.9% Māori religious beliefs, 0.8% Buddhist, 0.6% New Age, 0.1% Jewish, and 2.1% other religions. People who answered that they had no religion were 51.7%, and 6.7% of people did not answer the census question.

Of those at least 15 years old, 6,321 (18.3%) people had a bachelor's or higher degree, 18,645 (53.9%) had a post-high school certificate or diploma, and 7,761 (22.4%) people exclusively held high school qualifications. The median income was $48,200, compared with $41,500 nationally. 5,262 people (15.2%) earned over $100,000 compared to 12.1% nationally. The employment status of those at least 15 was that 19,119 (55.3%) people were employed full-time, 3,945 (11.4%) were part-time, and 915 (2.6%) were unemployed.

=== Suburbs ===
The main suburbs of Upper Hutt, from north-east to south-west, include:

Te Mārua, Akatarawa, Rimutaka, Parkdale, Emerald Hill, Birchville, Timberlea, Brown Owl, Kaitoke, Maoribank, Ebdentown, Upper Hutt Central, Clouston Park, Mangaroa, Maymorn, Whitemans Valley, Tōtara Park, Kingsley Heights, Elderslea, Wallaceville, Trentham, Heretaunga, Silverstream and Pinehaven.

Developments in the area include Mount Timbale Marua, Marua Downs, Waitoka Estate, Wallaceville Estate, and Riverstone Terraces. A development called The Lanes was proposed but rejected by the Lanes Commissioners appointed by the council. This decision was made as to ensure the maintenance of the significant rural character and amenity in the Mangaroa Valley.

== Economy ==
=== Tyre factory ===
In 1945, Dunlop was granted a government licence to manufacture tyres. A site in Upper Hutt was purchased for a factory, and the first Dunlop tyres were produced on 11 March 1949. South Pacific Tyres was subsequently formed as a joint venture between Pacific Dunlop and the Goodyear Tire and Rubber Company. In November 1987, the company laid off around 120 of its 500 workers citing deregulation of the tyre industry that had led to reductions in the tariffs imposed on imported tyres. In June 2008, the company announced that the plant would be closing within 8 months.

=== Brewtown ===
In 2008, a 20.2 hectares (50 acres) site including the former tyre factory was purchased by property developer Malcolm Gillies, with the intention of turning it into an industrial park. The subsequent development of the site has focussed on craft brewing and the area has been branded as Brewtown. As of 2024, Brewtown is home to some popular entertainment attractions such as Daytona Adventure Park, which houses Go-kart racing, ice skating and ten-pin bowling. There are some other activities like escape rooms and axe throwing in the area. Weekend markets and events are also hosted on the grassy area.

== Transport ==
=== Road ===
State Highway 2 is the principal highway through Upper Hutt, connecting with Lower Hutt and Wellington's motorway system to the south, and the Wairarapa region via the Remutaka Hill Road to the north.

Fergusson Drive is the main thoroughfare through suburban Upper Hutt, passing through the city centre and connecting to State Highway 2 at Silverstream and Maoribank. It formed part of State Highway 2 before the River Road bypass opened in 1987.

In the 1980s, significant travel delays were being experienced through Upper Hutt, with State Highway 2 traffic travelling from Lower Hutt and Wellington to central Upper Hutt and further afield to the Wairarapa being funnelled down the two-lane Fergusson Drive and mixing with local traffic through Silverstream and Trentham. With the central government reluctant to fund any road improvements in the area, the Upper Hutt City Council commissioned the construction of a two-laned high-speed bypass along the banks of Te Awa Kairangi / Hutt River from the Taitā Gorge in the south to Māoribank in the north. River Road, as the road became known, opened in 1987. It promptly ran at full capacity and, after several serious accidents that were a legacy of its origins, it was enlarged and re-engineered to cope with the growing traffic volume. Today, River Road is a median-divided 2+1 road from the Taitā Gorge to Tōtara Park, with two-laned undivided sections over the Moonshine Bridge and from Tōtara Park to Maoribank.

State Highway 58, while only briefly in Upper Hutt itself, intersects with SH 2 a short distance to the south of the boundary of Upper Hutt and Lower Hutt, and provides a link between Upper Hutt and Porirua.

State Highway 1 (as the Transmission Gully Motorway) briefly touches Upper Hutt at the Wainui Saddle (the tripoint of Upper Hutt, Porirua City and the Kāpiti Coast District), but otherwise does not pass through the region.

=== Bus ===
Bus services, planned and subsidised by Greater Wellington Regional Council under the Metlink brand, are centred around the Upper Hutt railway station and operate from Monday to Saturday on most routes, with the 110 route between Upper Hutt and Lower Hutt operating 7 days a week. All of the urbanised areas of the city are served by public bus routes, and the rural areas are served by school buses.

=== Railway ===
Upper Hutt is on the Hutt Valley Line, Metlink electric trains operated by Transdev Wellington run between 4:30 am and 11 pm weekdays, (midnight Fridays), 5 am till midnight Saturdays and 6 am till 11 pm Sundays. Service which reaches Waterloo in Lower Hutt in around 20 minutes and Wellington in around 45 minutes. Express peak hour weekday trains reach Wellington in around 38 minutes. Services run every 20 minutes between 6 am and 4:30 pm weekday and half-hourly Saturdays, Sundays and public holidays. Evening services run hourly from 8 to 11 pm.

The railway continues beyond Upper Hutt to Masterton, becoming the Wairarapa Line, which is not electrified. Masterton is about an hour away by morning and afternoon diesel hauled trains. There are services five times a day each way Monday to Thursday, six on Friday, and twice a day, each way on Saturday, Sunday, and public holidays. A notable feature of this section of railway is the Rimutaka Tunnel, the second-longest railway tunnel in New Zealand, which replaced the Rimutaka Incline in 1955.

There are six railway stations within the boundaries of the city: Silverstream, Heretaunga, Trentham, Wallaceville, Upper Hutt (the main station for the city and outer terminus of electric services), and Maymorn (a request stop on the Wairarapa Line).

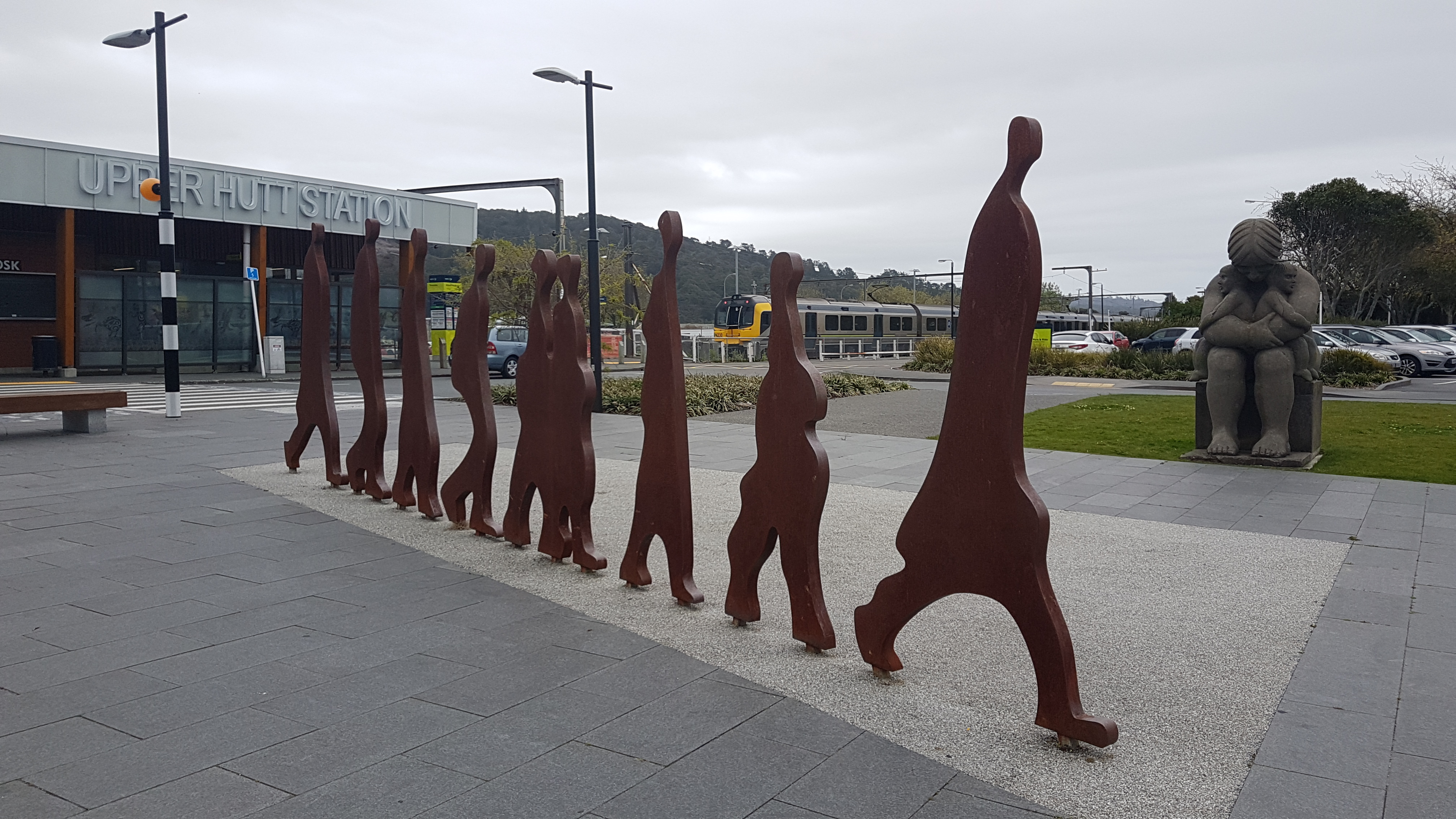
Public art outside the Upper Hutt railway station.

Upper Hutt's main railway station was originally built in 1876 but has been rebuilt twice, firstly in 1955 and more recently in 2015. The most recent rebuild, jointly funded by NZTA and the Upper Hutt City Council, cost $3.5m and features a coffee bar, public toilets and an upgraded ticket office featuring real-time information of arrivals and departures of trains in a larger waiting room than the 1955 building.

In July 1955, the electrification of the railway line from Wellington to Upper Hutt was completed, allowing fast electric multiple unit trains to replace steam- and diesel-electric-hauled carriage trains. Later in November, the 8.8 km Rimutaka Tunnel opened, bypassing the Remutaka Incline and most of the existing line between Upper Hutt and Featherston, and reducing the time between the two from 2.5 hours to just 40 minutes.

The Blue Mountains Campus at Wallaceville is to be the location for KiwiRail 's national train control centre, which is to move from the Wellington railway station; to house a team of 120 train control team members in a 2,700 m^{2} (29,000 sq ft) train control room. It will be next to the rail network.

==== Remutaka Incline ====
To assist with the 1 in 15 grade of the Rimutaka Incline on the Featherston side of the range, the Fell engines that used a raised centre rail to haul trains up the steep grade were employed. The less steep 1 in 40 grades between Upper Hutt and the small settlement and shunting yard at Summit could be managed by ordinary steam locomotives. The only other rolling stock able to traverse the incline unaided were small bus-like Wairarapa railcars, colloquially known as "Tin Hares".

By the 1950s, the Fell system had become too expensive to operate and was closed on 29 October 1955. To replace it, the Rimutaka Tunnel had been constructed, opening on 3 November 1955. In conjunction with the tunnel, the laying of a new route, new bridges and substantial realignment and double-tracking of the rest of the line from Wellington to Trentham had occurred by 26 June 1955.

The course of the incline is open to the public as part of the Remutaka Rail Trail.

== Sports and recreation ==
Upper Hutt City SC Emblem & Website

Walking and mountain-biking is popular along Te Awa Kairangi / Hutt River and on the tracks in many parks, including Karapoti (focal point of the annual Karapoti Classic), Kaitoke, Cannon Point Walkway, Tunnel Gully and the Remutaka Rail Trail. Popular team sports include Cricket, Netball, Rugby, Rugby league, Soccer, and Valley Gridiron American football.

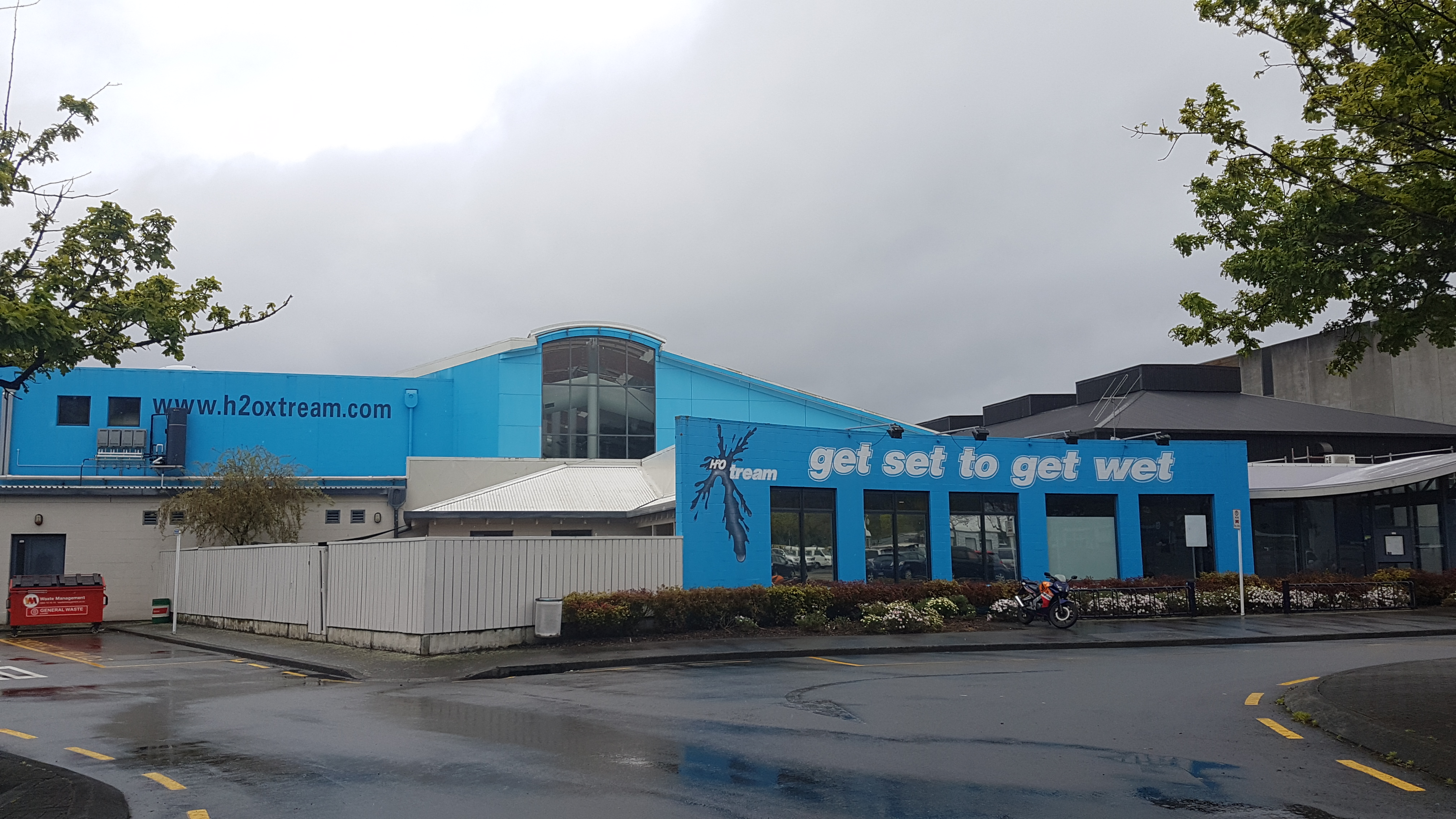
H_{2}O Xtream swimming pool

Expressions Whirinaki Arts and Entertainment Centre is home to Upper Hutt's public art gallery including Golden Homes Gallery and Mitre 10 Mega Create Gallery, these two galleries feature a diverse programme of Local and National exhibitions. The Expressions Whirinaki complex also includes Gillies Group Theatre; the city's performing arts venue, and the civic hall known as Professionals Recreation Hall. Close by is the central library of Upper Hutt Libraries – Ngā Puna Mātauranga o Te Awa Kairangi ki Uta and swimming pool H_{2}O Xtreme.

Upper Hutt is home to the biggest junior football club in New Zealand. The club was formed when Tararua Sports Club Inc and Upper Hutt City Soccer merged to create one club. The club now carries both of the old clubs' names. The club primarily plays its home games at Maidstone Park but also plays at Awakairangi, Harcourt Park and Trentham Memorial Park.

The city has one of New Zealand's largest Inline speed skating clubs, Valley Inline which has many successful skaters and holds the annual Speed King Tour that celebrated its 22nd year in 2012.

Popular recreation sites include:

- Staglands Wildlife Reserve at Akatarawa
- Taekwon-Do with United ITF New Zealand at Heretaunga
- Royal Wellington Golf Club at Heretaunga
- Te Mārua Golf Club at Te Mārua
- Wellington Family Speedway at Te Mārua
- Wellington Naturist Club at Te Mārua
- Kartsport Wellington Raceway at Kaitoke
- Wellington Racing Club at Trentham
- Trentham Memorial Park at Trentham
- Cannon Point Walkway
- Birchville Dam
- Upper Hutt Rugby Football Club at Maidstone Park, Upper Hutt
- Rimutaka Rugby Football Club at Maoribank, Upper Hutt
- Upper Hutt United Cricket Club at Trentham, Upper Hutt
- Upper Hutt City Soccer Club at Maidstone Park, Upper Hutt
- Harcourt Park diskgolf course at Harcourt Park, Upper Hutt
- Upper Hutt Roller Skating Club at Upper Hutt
- Wellington Model Aeroplane Club Inc at Trentham, Upper Hutt
- Upper Hutt Hockey Club at Maidstone Park, Upper Hutt

== Education ==
=== Primary schools ===
- Fraser Crescent School
- St Brendans School, Heretaunga
- Trentham School
- Birchville School
- Tōtara Park School
- St Josephs School, City Centre
- Upper Hutt School
- Plateau School
- Silverstream School
- Mangaroa School
- Maoribank School
- Pinehaven School
- Plateau School
- Oxford Crescent School
- Brown Owl Primary School

=== Intermediate schools ===
- Maidstone Intermediate
- Fergusson Intermediate

=== Secondary schools ===
- Heretaunga College
- Hutt International Boys' School, Trentham
- St. Patrick's College, Silverstream
- Upper Hutt College

== Sister-city relationships ==
- Mesa, Arizona, United States
