= Kingsley Heights =

- Suburb
- Interactive map of Kingsley Heights
- Coordinates: 41.125°S 175.083°E
- Country: New Zealand
- Island: North Island
- City: Upper Hutt
- Electorates: Remutaka; Ikaroa-Rāwhiti (Māori)

Government
  - Territorial Authority: Upper Hutt City Council
  - Regional council: Greater Wellington Regional Council
  - Mayor of Upper Hutt: Peri Zee
  - Remutaka MP: Chris Hipkins
  - Ikaroa-Rāwhiti MP: Cushla Tangaere-Manuel

Area
  - Total: 0.77 km^{2} (0.30 sq mi)

Population (2023 Census)
  - Total: 429
  - Density: 560/km^{2} (1,400/sq mi)

Kingsley Heights is a suburb of the city of Upper Hutt, located in the lower North Island of New Zealand. The suburb stands on a hill east of and overlooking the city centre, but has also started expanding into an adjacent valley.

All of the street names in the suburb have a British royalty theme. One example is King Charles Drive, the only road leading into the suburb, which is named after Charles II of England.

Kingsley Heights was proposed as a major subdivision project in the 1970s with Stage 1 beginning after the State Housing Corporation decided against using the land it owned in the area. Construction started in 1975 by First New Zealand RDC Limited and NZ Roadmakers, which consisted of 77 house lots. A delay was caused by the collapse of NZ Roadmakers however in 1976 The Leader, a local newspaper, announced construction had resumed. Around 1978 the first stage of road and utilities construction was complete and the first houses started to be built in the early 1980s.

The later stages of the project were delayed due to the economic downturn in the mid-late 1980s and the subsequent reduction in new home construction. The closure of the General Motors plant had a negative effect on employment in the city and so King Charles Drive ended at 19 and 26. Roading construction on the next stage of Kingsley Heights resumed many years later during 2001/2002 but it wasn't until 2005 that houses were built on Aragon, Boleyn and Beaufort. Craigs Flat, now known as Riverstone Terraces, which was also State Housing Corporation land but never used, had been promoted by various developers since the early 1990s as another major housing project in the city which also saw continued delays and reduced the urgency for the further expansion of Kingsley Heights.

King Charles Drive now ends at 41/58 with provision for the next stage of construction to continue in the future.

This suburb houses drinking-water storage tanks for Upper Hutt.

== Demographics ==
Kingsley Heights covers 0.77 km^{2} (0.30 sq mi). It is part of the Upper Hutt Central statistical area.

Historical population
Year	Pop.	±% p.a.
2006	234	—
2013	372	+6.85%
2018	435	+3.18%
2023	429	−0.28%

Kingsley Heights had a population of 429 in the 2023 New Zealand census, a decrease of 6 people (−1.4%) since the 2018 census, and an increase of 57 people (15.3%) since the 2013 census. There were 201 males, 225 females, and 3 people of other genders in 138 dwellings. 3.5% of people identified as LGBTIQ+. There were 93 people (21.7%) aged under 15 years, 63 (14.7%) aged 15 to 29, 234 (54.5%) aged 30 to 64, and 48 (11.2%) aged 65 or older.

People could identify as more than one ethnicity. The results were 79.7% European (Pākehā); 7.0% Māori; 2.1% Pasifika; 14.7% Asian; 2.1% Middle Eastern, Latin American and African New Zealanders (MELAA); and 4.9% other, which includes people giving their ethnicity as "New Zealander". English was spoken by 97.2%, Māori by 1.4%, Samoan by 0.7%, and other languages by 16.8%. No language could be spoken by 2.1% (e.g. too young to talk). The percentage of people born overseas was 30.1, compared with 28.8% nationally.

Religious affiliations were 38.5% Christian, 2.1% Hindu, 2.1% Islam, 0.7% Māori religious beliefs, 1.4% Buddhist, 1.4% Jewish, and 2.8% other religions. People who answered that they had no religion were 46.9%, and 6.3% of people did not answer the census question.

Of those at least 15 years old, 93 (27.7%) people had a bachelor's or higher degree, 177 (52.7%) had a post-high school certificate or diploma, and 69 (20.5%) people exclusively held high school qualifications. 72 people (21.4%) earned over $100,000 compared to 12.1% nationally. The employment status of those at least 15 was 216 (64.3%) full-time, 39 (11.6%) part-time, and 6 (1.8%) unemployed.
