= Maoribank =

Suburb of Upper Hutt, New Zealand

- Suburb
- Interactive map of Maoribank
- Coordinates: 41.1139°S 175.0960°E
- Country: New Zealand
- Region: Wellington Region
- Territorial authority: Upper Hutt
- Electorates: Remutaka; Ikaroa-Rāwhiti (Māori)

Government
  - Territorial Authority: Upper Hutt City Council
  - Regional council: Greater Wellington Regional Council
  - Mayor of Upper Hutt: Peri Zee
  - Remutaka MP: Chris Hipkins
  - Ikaroa-Rāwhiti MP: Cushla Tangaere-Manuel

Area
  - Total: 0.25 km^{2} (0.097 sq mi)

Population (2023 census)
  - Total: 669
  - Density: 2,700/km^{2} (6,900/sq mi)

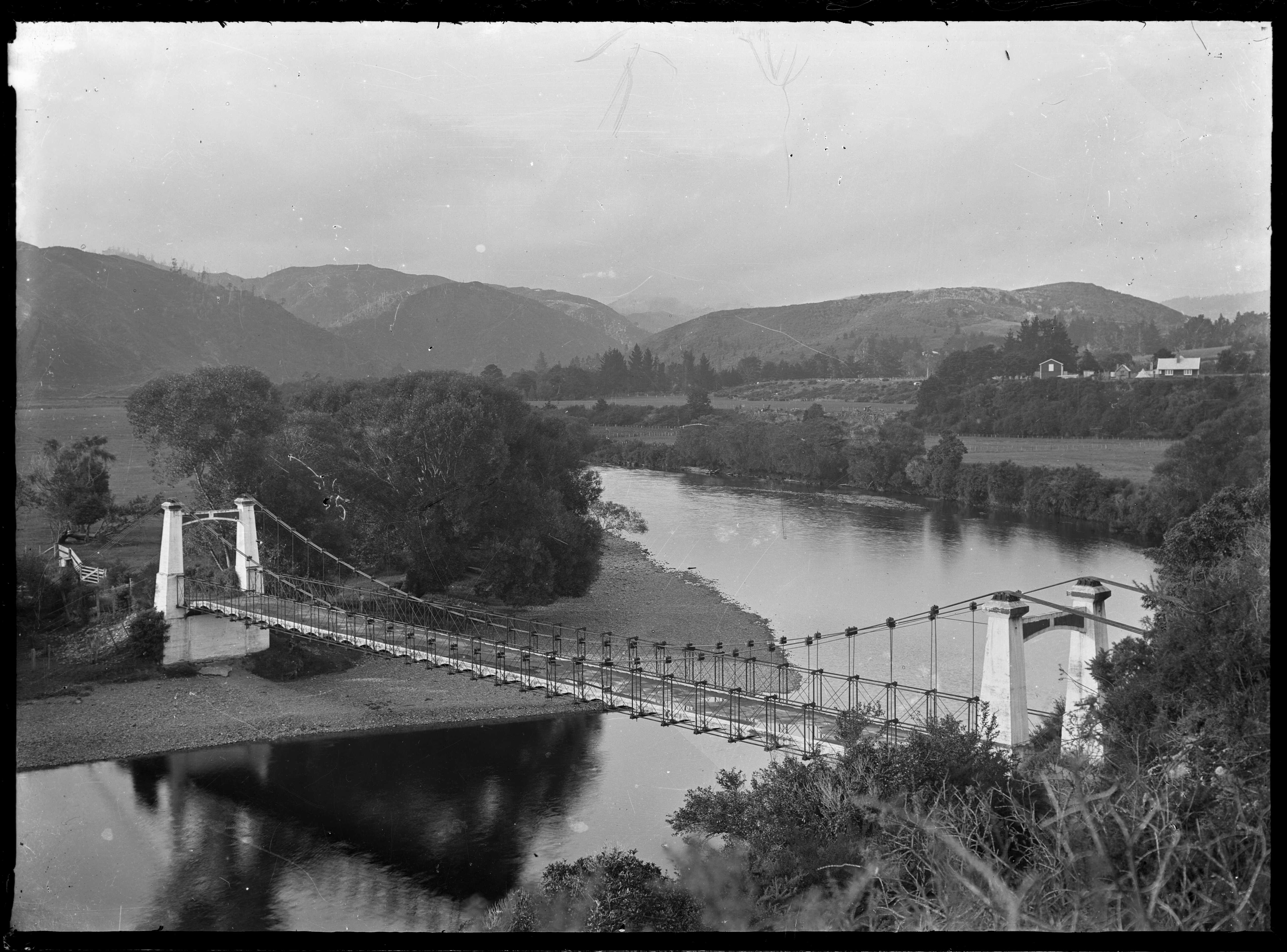
The suspension bridge at Maoribank, Upper Hutt City

Maoribank is a suburb of Upper Hutt, located 2–3 km east-northeast of the city centre. It was predominantly developed between 1950-1970.

It is located at the base of the Eastern Hutt Valley Hills, on a slight incline. Maoribank can be accessed from SH2 by exiting at either Mangaroa Hill Road or Moeraki Road. It is bordered by Timberlea by following Norana Road up the hill to the northeast, Brown Owl by crossing SH2, and Clouston Park to the southwest by crossing Mangaroa Hill Road. The Mangaroa Valley can be accessed by traversing Mangaroa Hill Road over the Mangaroa Hill in the Eastern Hutt Valley Hills.

While there are no shops in Maoribank, residents have access to a service station and small shopping centre in neighbouring Brown Owl. The shops in Central Upper Hutt are only 2 to 3 km away.

== Public transport ==
Maoribank is serviced by the Te Marua commuter bus route (#112), operated by Metlink.

The Wairarapa Connection train on the Wairarapa Line goes through Maoribank but does not stop; the Maoribank Tunnel under Mount Marua Drive (539 metres or 1,767 feet long) was built during construction of the Remutaka Tunnel in 1953–54.

== Demographics ==
Maoribank suburb covers 0.25 km^{2} (0.097 sq mi), and is part of Maoribank statistical area.

Historical population for the suburb
| Year | Pop. | ±% p.a. |
|---|---|---|
| 2006 | 585 | — |
| 2013 | 591 | +0.15% |
| 2018 | 639 | +1.57% |
| 2023 | 669 | +0.92% |

The suburb had a population of 669 in the 2023 New Zealand census, an increase of 30 people (4.7%) since the 2018 census, and an increase of 78 people (13.2%) since the 2013 census. There were 318 males, 345 females, and 3 people of other genders in 234 dwellings. 4.9% of people identified as LGBTIQ+. There were 123 people (18.4%) aged under 15 years, 153 (22.9%) aged 15 to 29, 324 (48.4%) aged 30 to 64, and 72 (10.8%) aged 65 or older.

People could identify as more than one ethnicity. The results were 75.3% European (Pākehā); 26.9% Māori; 11.7% Pasifika; 11.7% Asian; 0.4% Middle Eastern, Latin American and African New Zealanders (MELAA); and 2.7% other, which includes people giving their ethnicity as "New Zealander". English was spoken by 95.5%, Māori by 4.9%, Samoan by 1.8%, and other languages by 10.8%. No language could be spoken by 3.1% (e.g. too young to talk). New Zealand Sign Language was known by 0.4%. The percentage of people born overseas was 16.1, compared with 28.8% nationally.

Religious affiliations were 27.8% Christian, 2.7% Hindu, 1.3% Māori religious beliefs, 0.9% New Age, and 3.1% other religions. People who answered that they had no religion were 56.5%, and 7.6% of people did not answer the census question.

Of those at least 15 years old, 102 (18.7%) people had a bachelor's or higher degree, 333 (61.0%) had a post-high school certificate or diploma, and 108 (19.8%) people exclusively held high school qualifications. 48 people (8.8%) earned over $100,000 compared to 12.1% nationally. The employment status of those at least 15 was 333 (61.0%) full-time, 48 (8.8%) part-time, and 12 (2.2%) unemployed.

=== Maoribank statistical area ===
Maoribank statistical area covers 3.49 km^{2} (1.35 sq mi) and includes Timberlea. It had an estimated population of 3,580 as of June 2025, with a population density of 1,026 people per km^{2}.

Historical population for the statistical area
| Year | Pop. | ±% p.a. |
|---|---|---|
| 2006 | 2,565 | — |
| 2013 | 2,841 | +1.47% |
| 2018 | 3,318 | +3.15% |
| 2023 | 3,450 | +0.78% |

The statistical area had a population of 3,450 in the 2023 New Zealand census, an increase of 132 people (4.0%) since the 2018 census, and an increase of 609 people (21.4%) since the 2013 census. There were 1,716 males, 1,725 females, and 6 people of other genders in 1,188 dwellings. 3.0% of people identified as LGBTIQ+. The median age was 35.4 years (compared with 38.1 years nationally). There were 750 people (21.7%) aged under 15 years, 630 (18.3%) aged 15 to 29, 1,707 (49.5%) aged 30 to 64, and 363 (10.5%) aged 65 or older.

People could identify as more than one ethnicity. The results were 74.7% European (Pākehā); 26.3% Māori; 9.2% Pasifika; 9.8% Asian; 1.2% Middle Eastern, Latin American and African New Zealanders (MELAA); and 3.0% other, which includes people giving their ethnicity as "New Zealander". English was spoken by 96.0%, Māori by 5.8%, Samoan by 2.4%, and other languages by 10.3%. No language could be spoken by 2.6% (e.g. too young to talk). New Zealand Sign Language was known by 0.5%. The percentage of people born overseas was 20.2, compared with 28.8% nationally.

Religious affiliations were 30.9% Christian, 1.7% Hindu, 0.1% Islam, 1.8% Māori religious beliefs, 0.3% Buddhist, 0.8% New Age, 0.1% Jewish, and 1.8% other religions. People who answered that they had no religion were 55.2%, and 7.6% of people did not answer the census question.

Of those at least 15 years old, 534 (19.8%) people had a bachelor's or higher degree, 1,563 (57.9%) had a post-high school certificate or diploma, and 606 (22.4%) people exclusively held high school qualifications. The median income was $50,800, compared with $41,500 nationally. 390 people (14.4%) earned over $100,000 compared to 12.1% nationally. The employment status of those at least 15 was 1,611 (59.7%) full-time, 288 (10.7%) part-time, and 90 (3.3%) unemployed.

== Education ==
Te Kura o Hau Karetu is a co-educational state primary school for Year 1 to 6 students, with a roll of 147 as of July 2026. It opened in 1969 as Maoribank School, and changed its name in 2021.

The nearest secondary school is Heretaunga College, some 5 km away in Trentham.
