= Emerald Hill, New Zealand =

Emerald Hill
- Suburb
- Interactive map of Emerald Hill
- Coordinates: 41.0964°S 175.1088°E
- Country: New Zealand
- Island: North Island
- City: Upper Hutt
- Electorates: Remutaka; Ikaroa-Rāwhiti (Māori)

Government
  - Territorial Authority: Upper Hutt City Council
  - Regional council: Greater Wellington Regional Council
  - Mayor of Upper Hutt: Peri Zee
  - Remutaka MP: Chris Hipkins
  - Ikaroa-Rāwhiti MP: Cushla Tangaere-Manuel

Area
  - Total: 0.55 km^{2} (0.21 sq mi)

Population (2023 Census)
  - Total: 273
  - Density: 500/km^{2} (1,300/sq mi)

Emerald Hill is a hill (and unofficial suburb or locality name) in the suburb of Birchville, Upper Hutt, New Zealand. The name Emerald Hill has been applied by developers Golden Homes Wellington Ltd to a housing development they are constructing on the north-eastern slopes of Emerald Hill. This development consists of around 4 or 5 streets off the end of Gemstone Drive.

The Metlink bus route 110 operates between Petone and the intersection of Emerald Hill Road with Gemstone Drive half-hourly during the day.

== Demographics ==
Emerald Hill covers 0.55 km^{2} (0.21 sq mi). It is part of the Birchville-Brown Owl statistical area, and is also included in the demographics for Birchville.

Historical population
| Year | Pop. | ±% p.a. |
|---|---|---|
| 2006 | 243 | — |
| 2013 | 261 | +1.03% |
| 2018 | 264 | +0.23% |
| 2023 | 273 | +0.67% |

Emerald Hill had a population of 273 in the 2023 New Zealand census, an increase of 9 people (3.4%) since the 2018 census, and an increase of 12 people (4.6%) since the 2013 census. There were 144 males and 129 females in 93 dwellings. 6.6% of people identified as LGBTIQ+. There were 48 people (17.6%) aged under 15 years, 48 (17.6%) aged 15 to 29, 132 (48.4%) aged 30 to 64, and 45 (16.5%) aged 65 or older.

People could identify as more than one ethnicity. The results were 89.0% European (Pākehā); 15.4% Māori; 2.2% Pasifika; 4.4% Asian; and 4.4% Middle Eastern, Latin American and African New Zealanders (MELAA). English was spoken by 97.8%, Māori by 4.4%, and other languages by 7.7%. The percentage of people born overseas was 18.7, compared with 28.8% nationally.

Religious affiliations were 25.3% Christian, 1.1% Hindu, 2.2% Islam, 1.1% Māori religious beliefs, and 3.3% other religions. People who answered that they had no religion were 59.3%, and 6.6% of people did not answer the census question.

Of those at least 15 years old, 48 (21.3%) people had a bachelor's or higher degree, 138 (61.3%) had a post-high school certificate or diploma, and 39 (17.3%) people exclusively held high school qualifications. 57 people (25.3%) earned over $100,000 compared to 12.1% nationally. The employment status of those at least 15 was 135 (60.0%) full-time, 24 (10.7%) part-time, and 6 (2.7%) unemployed.
