= Brown Owl, New Zealand =

Suburb of Upper Hutt City, New Zealand

Brown Owl
- Suburb
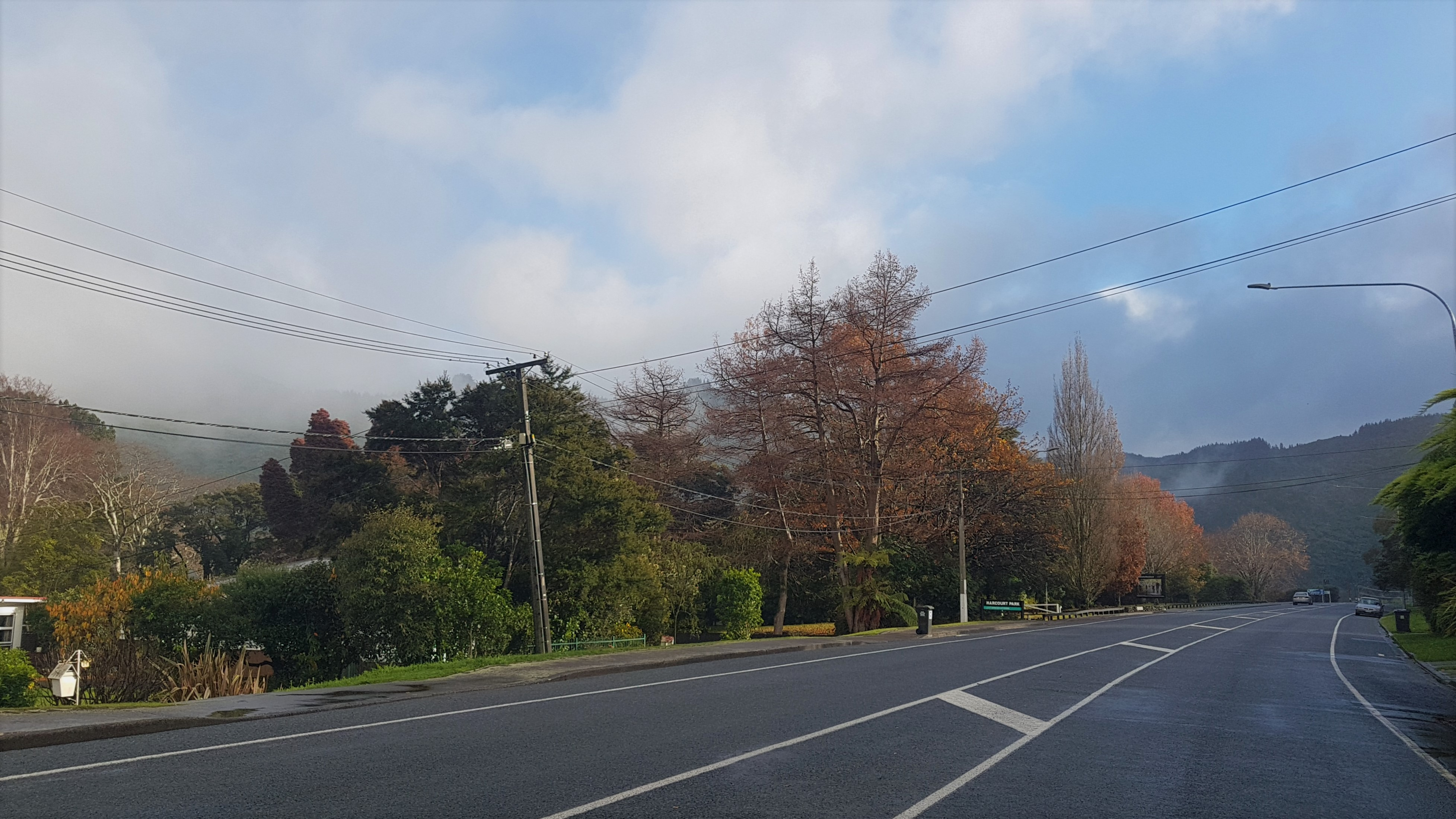
- Akatarawa Road in Brown Owl
- Interactive map of Brown Owl
- Coordinates: 41.1049°S 175.0983°E
- Country: New Zealand
- Region: Wellington Region
- Territorial authority: Upper Hutt
- Electorates: Remutaka; Ikaroa-Rāwhiti (Māori)

Government
  - Territorial Authority: Upper Hutt City Council
  - Regional council: Greater Wellington Regional Council
  - Mayor of Upper Hutt: Peri Zee
  - Remutaka MP: Chris Hipkins
  - Ikaroa-Rāwhiti MP: Cushla Tangaere-Manuel

Area
  - Total: 1.13 km^{2} (0.44 sq mi)

Population (2023 Census)
  - Total: 1,959
  - Density: 1,730/km^{2} (4,490/sq mi)

Brown Owl is a suburb of Upper Hutt, located 3–4km from the city centre. It developed slowly from the 1960s.

The suburb is located on the eastern side of the Hutt River at the base of the Eastern Hutt Valley Hills and Emerald Hill, with SH2 running right through it. It is bordered by Timberlea to the east (at the intersection of SH2 and Norana Road in the northeast), Maoribank to the south of SH2 at Moeraki Road, and Birchville just past the northern side of Harcourt Park on Akatarawa Road. Tōtara Park can be accessed by foot by crossing the Harcourt Park Bridge at the end of Norbert Street.

== Subdivisions ==
Brown Owl is split into three distinctive areas:

The main central part of Brown Owl was mostly developed between 1970 and 1990, and contains all of the businesses in Brown Owl.

On the south-western side of Emerald Hill are four streets which contain houses that offer expansive views across the Upper Hutt Valley. The main street, Sunnyview Drive, regularly contains a Christmas lights exhibition each December; many of the residents decorate their houses and the street with extensive lights displays. It can be seen right across the Upper Hutt Valley. This area was mainly developed in the late 1960s and early 1970s.

Next to the river and Te Haukaretu Park is the Riverglade subdivision. This modern subdivision, developed between the early 1990s and mid-2000s, contains large executive homes, many of which have views across Te Haukaretu Park towards the Hutt River.

== Parks ==
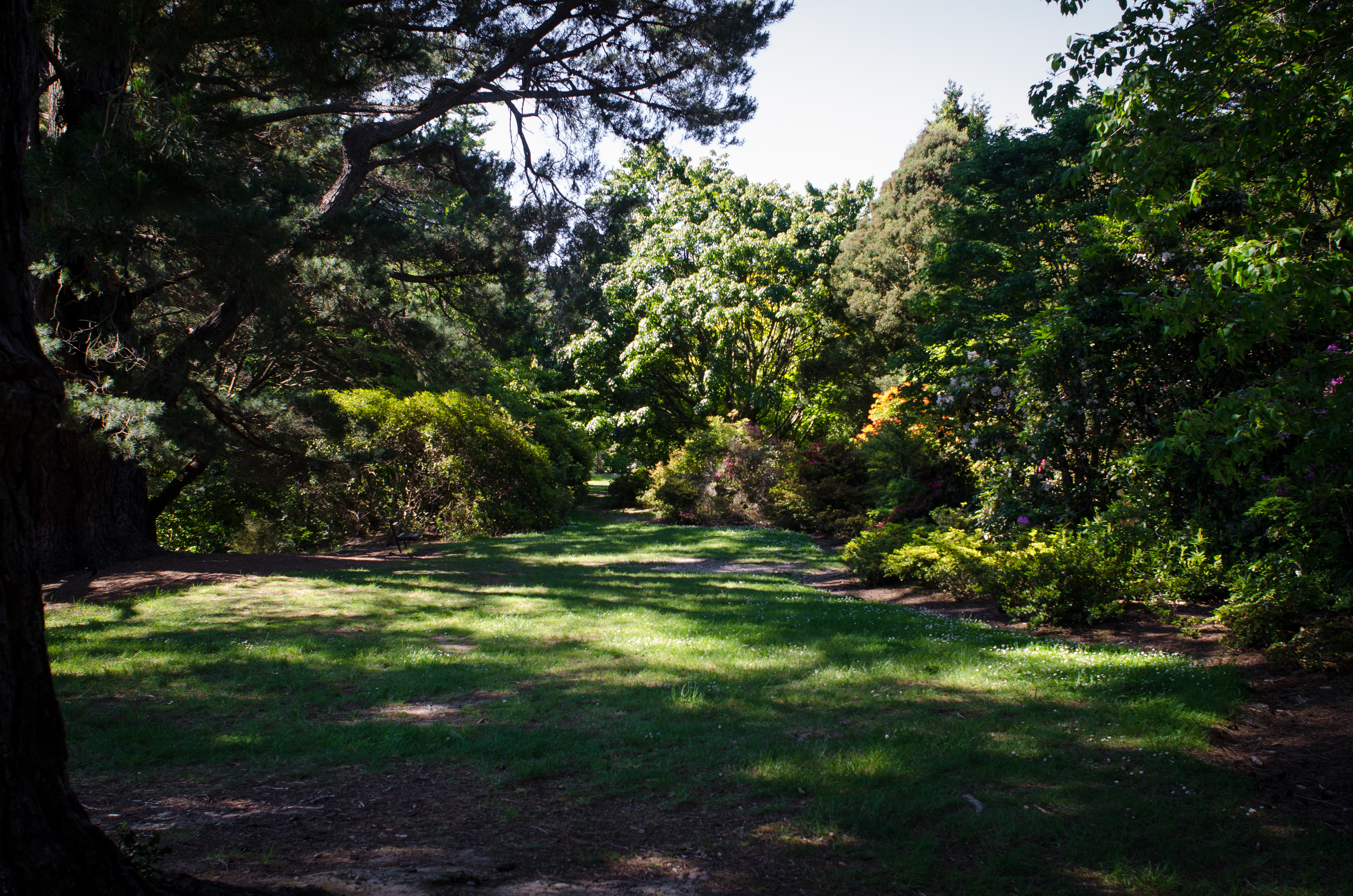
Harcourt Park

There are three public parks in Brown Owl:

Brown Owl Park, located off of SH2 (access point from Speargrass Grove, Timberlea also), contains some bush and a small trail.

Te Haukaretu Park is located at the end of Norbert Street next to the Harcourt Park Bridge. This picturesque park runs along the eastern bank of the Hutt River. A playground and duck pond are located at its southern end, and a large football field is at its northern end. It has pedestrian access from SH2. A section of the Hutt River Trail runs through this park.

Located off of Akatarawa Road and Norbert Street, Harcourt Park is a large, major park in Upper Hutt. It contains a small playground and a large playground, along with a toddlers' pool and public toilets at its eastern end. It has a soundstage in the south-western end near the Norbert Street entrance, which is used for small local concerts and events. There is a learn-to-ride cycle track on the park's northern side, as well as many wide lawns throughout the park for picnicking or relaxing. Wellington's Kiwi Holiday Park is located on its northern side off of Akaratawa Road. The Hutt River Trail runs along the western edge of the park. Harcourt Park is a good spot to witness river terracing. The Gardens of Isengard scenes in the Lord of the Rings trilogy were filmed in Harcourt Park.

== Demographics ==
Brown Owl covers 1.13 km^{2} (0.44 sq mi), and is split between the Birchville-Brown Owl and Maoribank statistical areas.

Historical population for Brown Owl
Year	Pop.	±% p.a.
2006	1,437	—
2013	1,593	+1.48%
2018	1,818	+2.68%
2023	1,959	+1.51%

Brown Owl had a population of 1,959 in the 2023 New Zealand census, an increase of 141 people (7.8%) since the 2018 census, and an increase of 366 people (23.0%) since the 2013 census. There were 963 males, 996 females, and 3 people of other genders in 714 dwellings. 3.1% of people identified as LGBTIQ+. There were 429 people (21.9%) aged under 15 years, 318 (16.2%) aged 15 to 29, 945 (48.2%) aged 30 to 64, and 273 (13.9%) aged 65 or older.

People could identify as more than one ethnicity. The results were 77.9% European (Pākehā); 18.2% Māori; 7.4% Pasifika; 10.6% Asian; 2.5% Middle Eastern, Latin American and African New Zealanders (MELAA); and 2.6% other, which includes people giving their ethnicity as "New Zealander". English was spoken by 96.3%, Māori by 3.8%, Samoan by 1.5%, and other languages by 11.3%. No language could be spoken by 2.6% (e.g. too young to talk). New Zealand Sign Language was known by 0.5%. The percentage of people born overseas was 22.7, compared with 28.8% nationally.

Religious affiliations were 32.6% Christian, 2.8% Hindu, 0.6% Islam, 1.1% Māori religious beliefs, 0.5% Buddhist, 0.6% New Age, and 1.7% other religions. People who answered that they had no religion were 53.8%, and 6.1% of people did not answer the census question.

Of those at least 15 years old, 321 (21.0%) people had a bachelor's or higher degree, 861 (56.3%) had a post-high school certificate or diploma, and 345 (22.5%) people exclusively held high school qualifications. 216 people (14.1%) earned over $100,000 compared to 12.1% nationally. The employment status of those at least 15 was 927 (60.6%) full-time, 192 (12.5%) part-time, and 45 (2.9%) unemployed.

=== Birchville-Brown Owl statistical area ===
Birchville-Brown Owl statistical area covers 8.99 km^{2} (3.47 sq mi) and includes Birchville. It had an estimated population of 3,870 as of June 2025, with a population density of 430.48 people per km^{2}.

Historical population for Birchville-Brown Owl
Year	Pop.	±% p.a.
2006	3,339	—
2013	3,327	−0.05%
2018	3,519	+1.13%
2023	3,762	+1.34%

Birchville-Brown Owl had a population of 3,762 in the 2023 New Zealand census, an increase of 243 people (6.9%) since the 2018 census, and an increase of 435 people (13.1%) since the 2013 census. There were 1,869 males, 1,875 females, and 15 people of other genders in 1,380 dwellings. 3.9% of people identified as LGBTIQ+. The median age was 38.4 years (compared with 38.1 years nationally). There were 753 people (20.0%) aged under 15 years, 669 (17.8%) aged 15 to 29, 1,827 (48.6%) aged 30 to 64, and 516 (13.7%) aged 65 or older.

People could identify as more than one ethnicity. The results were 83.7% European (Pākehā); 17.5% Māori; 5.6% Pasifika; 6.9% Asian; 1.4% Middle Eastern, Latin American and African New Zealanders (MELAA); and 1.9% other, which includes people giving their ethnicity as "New Zealander". English was spoken by 97.4%, Māori by 3.4%, Samoan by 1.3%, and other languages by 8.1%. No language could be spoken by 2.0% (e.g. too young to talk). New Zealand Sign Language was known by 0.6%. The percentage of people born overseas was 19.5, compared with 28.8% nationally.

Religious affiliations were 27.4% Christian, 1.5% Hindu, 0.5% Islam, 1.0% Māori religious beliefs, 0.5% Buddhist, 0.6% New Age, 0.1% Jewish, and 1.8% other religions. People who answered that they had no religion were 60.7%, and 6.1% of people did not answer the census question.

Of those at least 15 years old, 609 (20.2%) people had a bachelor's or higher degree, 1,749 (58.1%) had a post-high school certificate or diploma, and 654 (21.7%) people exclusively held high school qualifications. The median income was $52,000, compared with $41,500 nationally. 450 people (15.0%) earned over $100,000 compared to 12.1% nationally. The employment status of those at least 15 was 1,776 (59.0%) full-time, 384 (12.8%) part-time, and 96 (3.2%) unemployed.

== Schools ==
Brown Owl School opened in 1879 as Mungaroa School, changed its name to Te Marua School in 1913, and changed again to Brown Owl in the early 1970s. It closed in 2003.

The nearest primary schools are Maoribank School and Birchville School. The nearest secondary school is Heretaunga College, some 6 km away.

== Public transport ==
Brown Owl is serviced by the Emerald Hill – Petone commuter bus service (#110), operated by Metlink.

== Businesses ==
Notable businesses in Brown Owl include Brown Owl Fisheries, Z Rimutaka, Greenstone Doors, and Wellington’s Kiwi Holiday Park.

== Religion ==
Rimutaka Baptist Church is located in Brown Owl.
