= Tōtara Park =

Suburb of Upper Hutt City, New Zealand

- Suburb
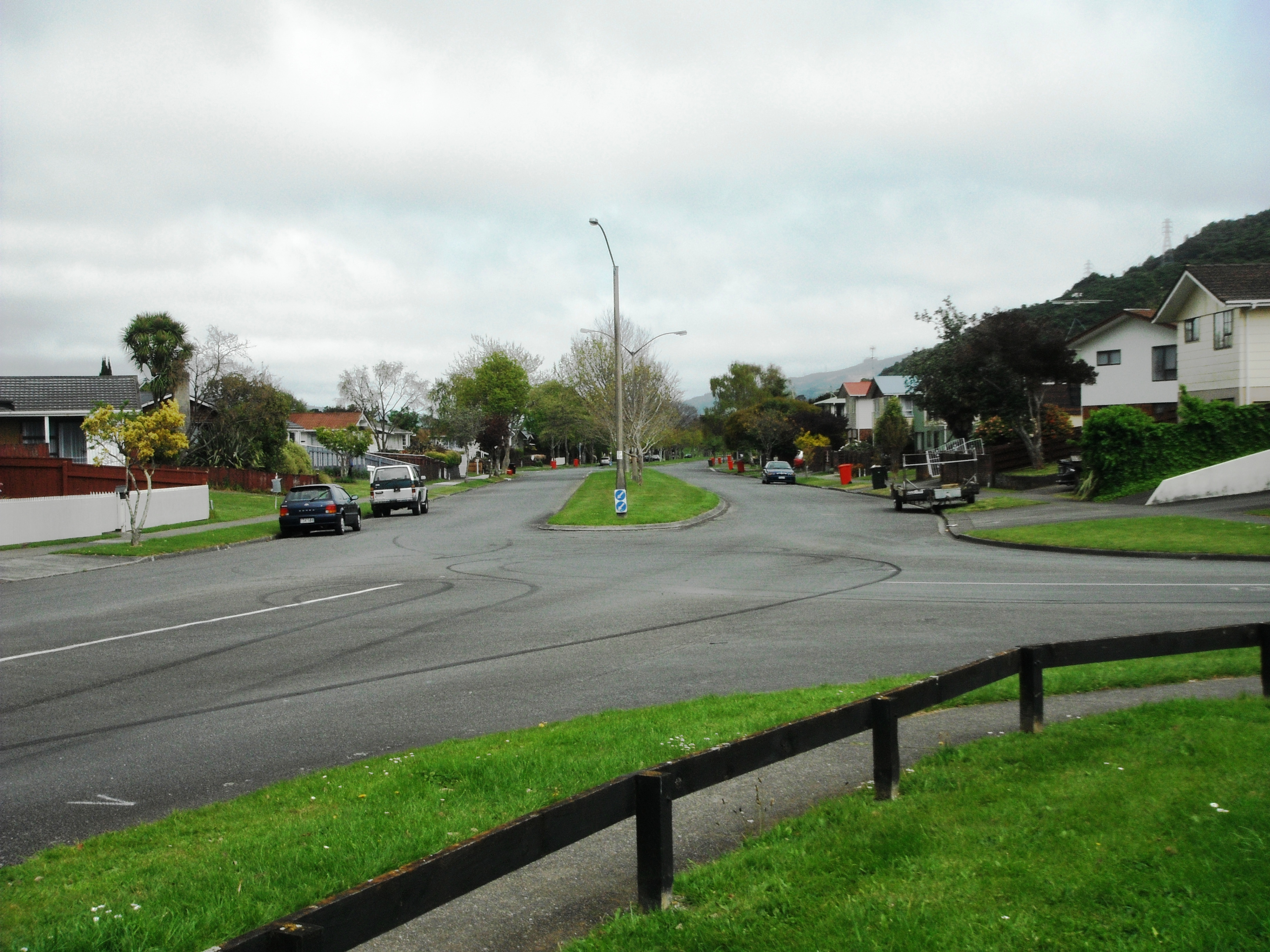
- California Drive in Tōtara Park, built extra wide to keep houses away from the Wellington Fault that runs under it.
- Interactive map of Tōtara Park
- Coordinates: 41.108°S 175.085°E
- Country: New Zealand
- Region: Wellington Region
- Territorial authority: Upper Hutt
- Electorates: Remutaka; Ikaroa-Rāwhiti (Māori)

Government
  - Territorial Authority: Upper Hutt City Council
  - Regional council: Greater Wellington Regional Council
  - Mayor of Upper Hutt: Peri Zee
  - Remutaka MP: Chris Hipkins
  - Ikaroa-Rāwhiti MP: Cushla Tangaere-Manuel

Area
  - Total: 1.72 km^{2} (0.66 sq mi)

Population (June 2025)
  - Total: 2,940
  - Density: 1,710/km^{2} (4,430/sq mi)

Tōtara Park is a suburb of Upper Hutt, New Zealand, located 2 km northeast of the city centre. It is accessed via the Tōtara Park Bridge which crosses the Hutt River, connecting it to State Highway 2 and the main Upper Hutt urban area. It was popular in the 1970s and 1980s for families moving into the Upper Hutt area.

Most of the streets in Tōtara Park are named after states, towns and cities of the United States, with the main road running through the suburb being California Drive.

Tōtara Park is built on alluvial gravel. The Wellington Fault runs through the suburb—one section of California Drive straddles the fault, and the road lanes are built on either side of the fault with a large central reservation between them. This was designed so houses would be offset at least 20 metres from the fault, hopefully limiting damage if the fault were to rupture.

The Māori names for this area are Te Hau-karetu and for the Hutt River itself; Heretaunga, and Awa Kairangi. In December 2019, the official name of the suburb was gazetted as "Tōtara Park".

== Demographics ==
Totara Park statistical area covers 1.72 km^{2} (0.66 sq mi). It had an estimated population of 2,940 as of June 2025, with a population density of 1,709 people per km^{2}.

Historical population
Year	Pop.	±% p.a.
2006	2,853	—
2013	2,874	+0.10%
2018	2,901	+0.19%
2023	2,889	−0.08%

Totara Park had a population of 2,889 in the 2023 New Zealand census, a decrease of 12 people (−0.4%) since the 2018 census, and an increase of 15 people (0.5%) since the 2013 census. There were 1,440 males, 1,446 females, and 9 people of other genders in 1,038 dwellings. 3.6% of people identified as LGBTIQ+. The median age was 36.7 years (compared with 38.1 years nationally). There were 633 people (21.9%) aged under 15 years, 465 (16.1%) aged 15 to 29, 1,398 (48.4%) aged 30 to 64, and 393 (13.6%) aged 65 or older.

People could identify as more than one ethnicity. The results were 83.9% European (Pākehā); 15.6% Māori; 5.4% Pasifika; 8.2% Asian; 1.2% Middle Eastern, Latin American and African New Zealanders (MELAA); and 2.9% other, which includes people giving their ethnicity as "New Zealander". English was spoken by 96.6%, Māori by 2.4%, Samoan by 1.2%, and other languages by 8.7%. No language could be spoken by 2.8% (e.g. too young to talk). New Zealand Sign Language was known by 0.7%. The percentage of people born overseas was 18.6, compared with 28.8% nationally.

Religious affiliations were 26.6% Christian, 2.0% Hindu, 0.1% Islam, 0.7% Māori religious beliefs, 0.4% Buddhist, 0.2% New Age, and 1.5% other religions. People who answered that they had no religion were 59.9%, and 8.6% of people did not answer the census question.

Of those at least 15 years old, 417 (18.5%) people had a bachelor's or higher degree, 1,371 (60.8%) had a post-high school certificate or diploma, and 474 (21.0%) people exclusively held high school qualifications. The median income was $50,800, compared with $41,500 nationally. 306 people (13.6%) earned over $100,000 compared to 12.1% nationally. The employment status of those at least 15 was 1,341 (59.4%) full-time, 270 (12.0%) part-time, and 48 (2.1%) unemployed.

== Points of interest ==
Tōtara Park was the name for the entire eastern side of the upper valley, due to the Tōtara trees that grew there.

Was the western side to an ornate suspension bridge opened in 1917. Maoribank Bridge, originally being able to carry automobiles and trucks, eventually was used for pedestrians only, and finally collapsing in a medium flood in the early 1990s. A new modern type suspension bridge was then built on the northern side towards Brown Owl.

The river surrounding the original suspension bridge was a popular picnic and swimming spot for the entire region.

=== Cannon Point Walkway ===
The Cannon Point Walkway is a loop of 7.7 kilometres (4.8 mi) in length, ascending along the western side of the valley to the Cannon Point trig at 341 metres (1,119 ft), and with a total elevation gain of 304 metres (997 ft). The walkway is mostly within the Akatarawa Regional Park. It was named for an old fallen tree resembling a cannon that was once there. Walking routes, cycle tracks and logging roads connect Cannon Point to Akatarawa, Moonshine and other areas to the west.

=== California Park ===
California Park is a large neighbourhood park including a playground, the Upper Hutt Municipal Brass Band club rooms and open space. The park provides a readily accessible place to see the crush zone of the Wellington Fault.

== Transport ==
Metlink bus route 111 connects Tōtara Park with central Upper Hutt and Upper Hutt Railway Station.

== Education ==
Tōtara Park School is a co-educational state primary school for Year 1 to 6 students, with a roll of 222 as of July 2026. It opened in 1977.
