= Timberlea, New Zealand =

Timberlea
- Suburb
- Interactive map of Timberlea
- Coordinates: 41.106°S 175.106°E
- Country: New Zealand
- Region: Wellington Region
- City: Upper Hutt
- Electorates: Remutaka; Ikaroa-Rāwhiti (Māori)

Government
  - Territorial Authority: Upper Hutt City Council
  - Regional council: Greater Wellington Regional Council
  - Mayor of Upper Hutt: Peri Zee
  - Remutaka MP: Chris Hipkins
  - Ikaroa-Rāwhiti MP: Cushla Tangaere-Manuel

Area
  - Total: 2.04 km^{2} (0.79 sq mi)

Population (2023 census)
  - Total: 1,689
  - Density: 828/km^{2} (2,140/sq mi)

Timberlea is a suburb of Upper Hutt, located 3.5-6.5 km northeast from the city centre.

The suburb is located on a plateau of the Eastern Hutt Valley Hills, with most of the suburb being 115-135 metres above sea level. It can be accessed from SH2 by exiting at Norana Road. It is bordered by Maoribank at the lower, south-western end of Norana Road and Brown Owl by SH2 to the north.

While there are no shops in Timberlea, residents have access to shops in neighbouring Brown Owl. The main shops in Upper Hutt's city centre are about 3-6 km away.

== Subdivisions ==
Timberlea is effectively split into three distinctive areas:

The main part of Timberlea (between Mount Marua Drive and the border with Maoribank by Garth Lane) was developed mainly between the late 1960s and the early 1980s.

The section of Timberlea between Mount Marua Drive and SH2 is a modern and relatively upmarket subdivision, with most houses being built from 2007 to the present.

The section above Mount Marua Drive is known as Mount Marua (from Marua Palms Grove eastwards). This area, having been developed from 2010 onwards, is one of Upper Hutt's most upmarket and exclusive areas, containing many large homes on large sections, with nearly every house having an uninterrupted view of either the Upper Hutt Valley or the Mangaroa Valley (or both), due to being situated at the top of the Eastern Hutt Valley Hills. Mount Marua Way, situated at the highest point of the subdivision (between 210 and 240 metres above sea level), is a private gated community that has a communal tennis court and small pond.

== Demographics ==
Timberlea covers 3.04 km^{2} (1.17 sq mi), and is part of Maoribank statistical area.

Historical population
Year	Pop.	±% p.a.
2006	1,287	—
2013	1,443	+1.65%
2018	1,704	+3.38%
2023	1,689	−0.18%

Timberlea had a population of 1,689 in the 2023 New Zealand census, a decrease of 15 people (−0.9%) since the 2018 census, and an increase of 246 people (17.0%) since the 2013 census. There were 843 males, 834 females, and 6 people of other genders in 567 dwellings. 3.2% of people identified as LGBTIQ+. There were 363 people (21.5%) aged under 15 years, 288 (17.1%) aged 15 to 29, 870 (51.5%) aged 30 to 64, and 162 (9.6%) aged 65 or older.

People could identify as more than one ethnicity. The results were 73.9% European (Pākehā); 31.1% Māori; 9.4% Pasifika; 8.0% Asian; 0.7% Middle Eastern, Latin American and African New Zealanders (MELAA); and 3.4% other, which includes people giving their ethnicity as "New Zealander". English was spoken by 96.4%, Māori by 7.3%, Samoan by 3.2%, and other languages by 8.7%. No language could be spoken by 1.4% (e.g. too young to talk). New Zealand Sign Language was known by 0.5%. The percentage of people born overseas was 18.5, compared with 28.8% nationally.

Religious affiliations were 30.9% Christian, 1.2% Hindu, 2.8% Māori religious beliefs, 0.2% Buddhist, 0.4% New Age, 0.2% Jewish, and 1.4% other religions. People who answered that they had no religion were 55.4%, and 7.6% of people did not answer the census question.

Of those at least 15 years old, 249 (18.8%) people had a bachelor's or higher degree, 774 (58.4%) had a post-high school certificate or diploma, and 309 (23.3%) people exclusively held high school qualifications. 210 people (15.8%) earned over $100,000 compared to 12.1% nationally. The employment status of those at least 15 was 768 (57.9%) full-time, 147 (11.1%) part-time, and 63 (4.8%) unemployed.

== Parks ==
Timberlea has three public parks:

- Speargrass Park: Located off of Speargrass Grove and Blueberry Grove, it contains a small playground.
- Gentian Reserve: Located off of Gentian Street, this forest-covered reserve contains a few walking trails on the slopes of the hill on its eastern side.
- Timberlea Park: Accessed from Norana Road, this central Timberlea park contains a small playground, community hall and large lawn next to the bush-covered valley hills.

== Public transport ==
Timberlea is serviced by the Te Marua commuter bus route (#112), operated by Metlink.
