= Upper Hutt Central =

Central Business District of Upper Hutt, New Zealand

- Suburb
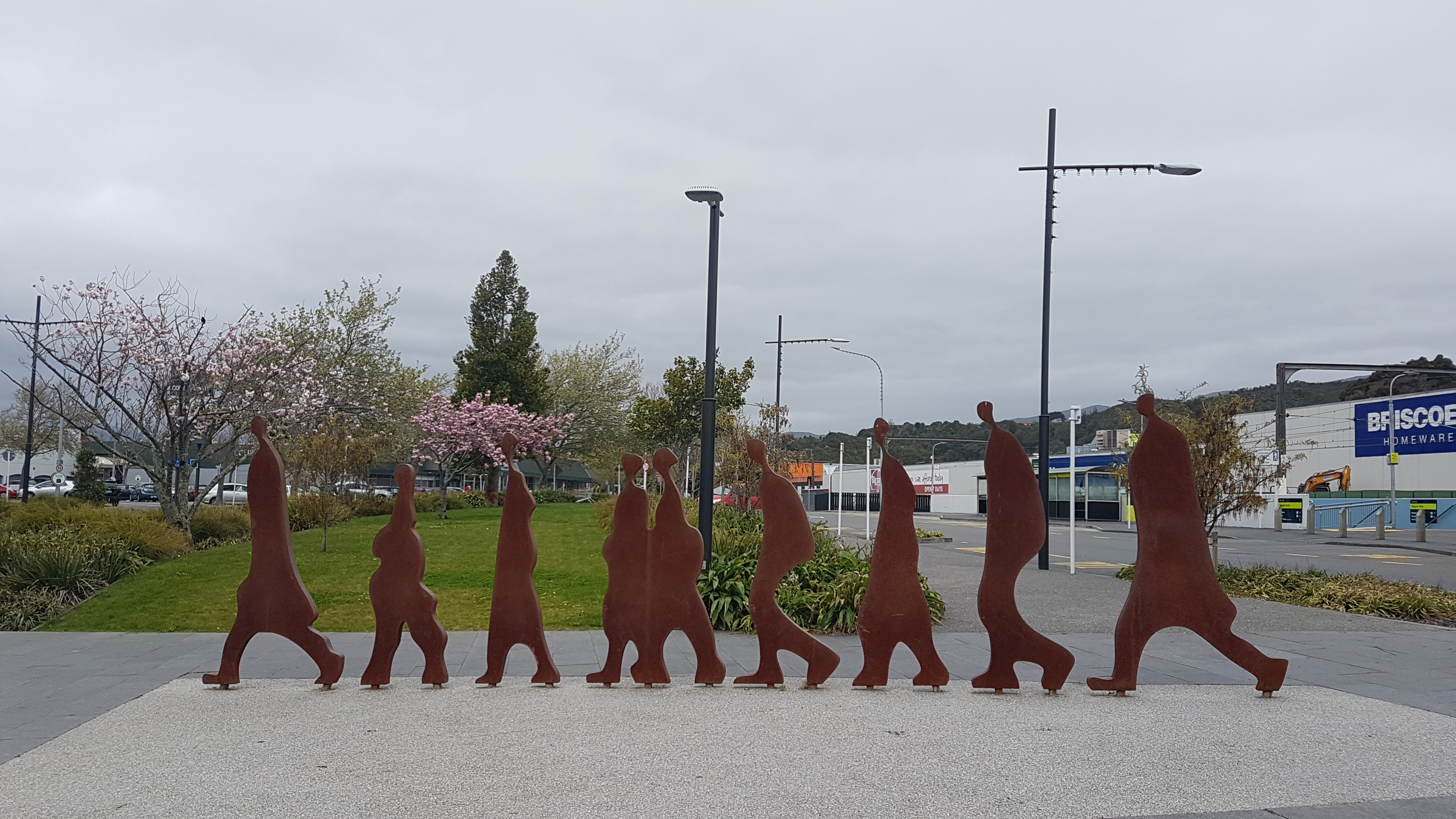
- Sculpture near the railway station
- Interactive map of Upper Hutt Central
- Coordinates: 41.124°S 175.071°E
- Country: New Zealand
- Region: Wellington Region
- Territorial authority: Upper Hutt
- Electorates: Remutaka; Ikaroa-Rāwhiti (Māori)

Government
  - Territorial Authority: Upper Hutt City Council
  - Regional council: Greater Wellington Regional Council
  - Mayor of Upper Hutt: Peri Zee
  - Remutaka MP: Chris Hipkins
  - Ikaroa-Rāwhiti MP: Cushla Tangaere-Manuel

Area
  - Total: 2.24 km^{2} (0.86 sq mi)

Population (June 2025)
  - Total: 670
  - Density: 300/km^{2} (770/sq mi)

Upper Hutt Central is the commercial and geographic focal point of Upper Hutt city, located in the lower North Island of New Zealand.

The area is served by Upper Hutt Railway Station.

== Economy ==
The main shopping street is Main St.

It includes The Mall Upper Hutt, a shopping centre with 44 shops including The Warehouse, Farmers, and Monterey Cinemas.

== Demographics ==
Upper Hutt Central statistical area covers 2.24 km^{2} (0.86 sq mi) and includes Kingsley Heights and Maidstone. It had an estimated population of 670 as of June 2025, with a population density of 299 people per km^{2}.

Historical population
Year	Pop.	±% p.a.
2006	417	—
2013	513	+3.00%
2018	615	+3.69%
2023	597	−0.59%

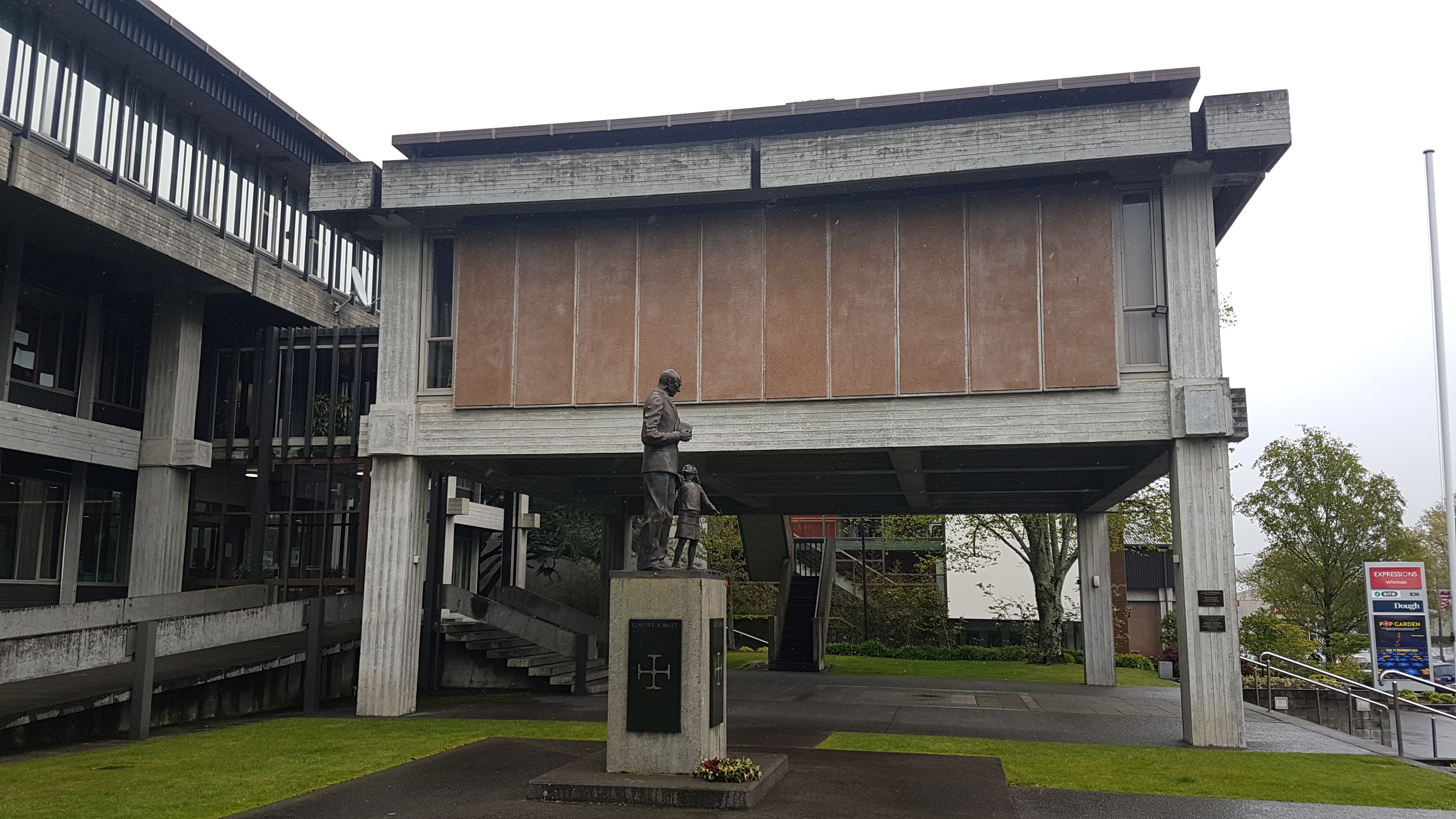
Upper Hutt City Council building

Upper Hutt Central had a population of 597 in the 2023 New Zealand census, a decrease of 18 people (−2.9%) since the 2018 census, and an increase of 84 people (16.4%) since the 2013 census. There were 288 males, 306 females, and 6 people of other genders in 216 dwellings. 3.0% of people identified as LGBTIQ+. The median age was 41.9 years (compared with 38.1 years nationally). There were 111 people (18.6%) aged under 15 years, 84 (14.1%) aged 15 to 29, 321 (53.8%) aged 30 to 64, and 81 (13.6%) aged 65 or older.

People could identify as more than one ethnicity. The results were 76.4% European (Pākehā); 10.6% Māori; 3.0% Pasifika; 18.6% Asian; 2.0% Middle Eastern, Latin American and African New Zealanders (MELAA); and 3.5% other, which includes people giving their ethnicity as "New Zealander". English was spoken by 97.0%, Māori by 1.5%, Samoan by 0.5%, and other languages by 17.1%. No language could be spoken by 2.0% (e.g. too young to talk). The percentage of people born overseas was 32.2, compared with 28.8% nationally.

Religious affiliations were 36.2% Christian, 2.0% Hindu, 2.0% Islam, 0.5% Māori religious beliefs, 1.0% Buddhist, 0.5% New Age, 1.0% Jewish, and 3.0% other religions. People who answered that they had no religion were 48.2%, and 6.0% of people did not answer the census question.

Of those at least 15 years old, 129 (26.5%) people had a bachelor's or higher degree, 243 (50.0%) had a post-high school certificate or diploma, and 117 (24.1%) people exclusively held high school qualifications. The median income was $56,300, compared with $41,500 nationally. 81 people (16.7%) earned over $100,000 compared to 12.1% nationally. The employment status of those at least 15 was 294 (60.5%) full-time, 57 (11.7%) part-time, and 15 (3.1%) unemployed.

== Education ==
Upper Hutt School is a co-educational state primary school for Year 1 to 6 students, with a roll of 440 as of July 2026. It opened in 1864 in rooms of the Upper Hutt Catholic Church, and moved to Trentham in 1866. It moved to its current site in 1909.

St Joseph's School is a co-educational state-integrated Catholic primary school for Year 1 to 8 students, with a roll of 552. The school celebrated its centenary in 2011. Its website says it was founded in 1910 although Mercy Schools says it opened to support an orphanage which was established in 1911.
