= Tauweru =

- Locality
- Interactive map of Tauweru
- Coordinates: 40°58′S 175°48′E
- Country: New Zealand
- Region: Wellington Region
- Territorial authority: Masterton District

Tauweru, alternatively Taueru, and previously known as Wardell, or Wardelltown is a locality in the Wairarapa region of New Zealand's North Island. It is named after and located on the middle reaches of the Tauweru River, which drains into the Ruamāhanga River near Gladstone and Te Whiti, and the name is a Māori-language word meaning "hanging in clusters".

Tauweru is situated east of the Wairarapa's largest town, Masterton, and is located on the main road between Masterton and Castlepoint. The nearest railway is the Wairarapa Line in Masterton. In June 1942, Tauweru was the epicentre of one of the most destructive earthquakes since European settlement of the Wairarapa in the mid-19th century.

== Demographics ==
Tauweru's local demographics are included with Bideford. It is part of the Whareama statistical area.
