= List of marae in the Wellington Region =

This is a list of marae (Māori meeting grounds) in the Wellington Region of New Zealand.

== Masterton District ==
Marae name	Wharenui name	Iwi and Hapū	Location
Ākura Marae	No wharenui	Ngāti Kahungunu (Ngāti Te Ahuahu, Ngāti Te Hina), Rangitāne (Ngāti Mātangiuru, Ngāti Te Hina)	Masterton
Motuwairaka	Burned down in 2017	Ngāti Kahungunu (Ngāi Tumapuhia-a-Rangi)	Whareama
Ngāi Tumapuhia a Rangi ki Okautete	Under construction	Ngāti Kahungunu (Ngāi Tumapuhia-a-Rangi)	Whareama
Te Oreore	Ngā Tau e Waru	Ngāti Kahungunu (Kahukuraawhitia, Kahukuranui, Ngāti Te Hina, Tahu o Kahungunu, Tamahau, Whiunga), Rangitāne (Hinetearorangi, Ngāi Tamahau, Ngāti Hāmua, Ngāti Taimahu, Ngāti Tangatakau, Ngāti Te Noti, Ngāti Te Raetea, Ngāti Te Whātui)	Masterton
Whakataki	Burned down in 1960	Ngāti Kahungunu (Te Hika a Pāpāuma ki Wairarapa)	Castlepoint

== Carterton District ==
Marae name	Wharenui name	Iwi and Hapū	Location
Hurunui o Rangi	Hurunui o Rangi	Ngāti Kahungunu (Ngāi Tahu, Ngāi Taneroroa, Ngāti Hinewaka, Ngāti Kaparuparu, Ngāti Moe, Ngāti Parera, Ngāti Rangitataia, Ngāti Rangitehewa, Ngāti Tatuki, Ngāti Te Tomo o Kahungunu), Rangitāne (Ngāi Tahu)	Gladstone

== South Wairarapa District ==
Marae name	Wharenui name	Iwi and hapū	Location
Hau Ariki	Te Whare Wananga o Tupai	Ngāti Kahungunu (Ngāti Hikawera o Kahungunu)	Martinborough
Kohunui	Te Tihi o Tuhirangi	Ngāti Kahungunu (Ngāi Rangawhakairi, Ngāti Rākairangi, Ngāti Tūkoko), Rangitāne (Ngāti Tūkoko)	Pirinoa
Pāpāwai	Hikurangi	Ngāti Kahungunu (Ngāti Kahukuranui o Kahungunu Kauiti, Ngāti Meroiti, Ngāti Moe), Rangitāne (Ngāti Meroiti, Ngāti Moe, Ngāti Tauiao, Ngāti Tūkoko)	Greytown

== Kāpiti Coast District ==
Marae name	Wharenui name	Iwi and hapū	Location
Te Pou o Tainui	Kapumanawawhiti	Ngāti Raukawa ki te Tonga (Ngāti Kapumanawawhiti)	Ōtaki
Katihiku	Tamatehura	Ngāti Raukawa ki te Tonga (Ngāti Huia)	Te Horo
Pukekaraka Marae	Hine Nui o te Ao Katoa, Roma	Catholic mission (used by Ngāti Raukawa ki te Tonga, Muaūpoko)	Ōtaki
Raukawa Marae	Ruakawa	Ngāti Raukawa ki te Tonga (Ngāti Korokī, Ngāti Maiotaki, Ngāti Pare)	Ōtaki
Whakarongotai	Puku Mahi Tamariki	Te Atiawa ki Whakarongotai	Waikanae

== Porirua City ==
Marae name	Wharenui name	Iwi and hapū	Location
Hongoeka Marae	Te Heke Mai Raro	Ngāti Toa Rangatira	Hongoeka
Takapuwahia Marae	Toa Rangatira	Ngāti Toa Rangatira	Takapuwahia

== Upper Hutt City ==
Marae name	Wharenui name	Iwi and hapū	Location
Ōrongomai Marae	Kahukura		Upper Hutt

== Lower Hutt City ==
Marae name	Wharenui name	Iwi and hapū	Location
Te Tatau o Te Pō	Te Tatau o Te Pō	Taranaki Whānui ki te Upoko o te Ika, Te Āti Awa	Alicetown
Waiwhetū Marae	Arohanui ki te Tangata / Te Ra o Te Raukura	Taranaki Whānui ki te Upoko o te Ika, Te Āti Awa	Waiwhetū

== Wellington City ==
Marae name	Wharenui name	Iwi and hapū	Location
Pipitea Marae	Te Upoko o te Ika a Māui	Taranaki Whānui ki te Upoko o te Ika, Te Āti Awa	Thorndon
Rongomaraeroa	Te Hono ki Hawaiki	Institutional (Museum of New Zealand Te Papa Tongarewa)	Wellington Central
Te Tumu Herenga Waka Marae	Te Tumu Herenga Waka	Ngāti Awa (Ngāti Awa ki Poneke)	Kelburn

== See also ==
- Lists of marae in New Zealand
- List of schools in the Wellington Region
- Tapu Te Ranga Marae
