= Tauanui River =

- Route of the Tauanui River
- Mouth of the Tauanui River Tauanui River (North Island)
- Native name: Tauanui (Māori)

Location
- Country: New Zealand
- Island: North Island
- Region: Wellington
- District: South Wairarapa

Physical characteristics
- Source: Aorangi Maunga
  - coordinates: 41.34988°S 175.33751°E
- Mouth: Ruamāhanga River
  - coordinates: 41°19′04″S 175°11′52″E
- Length: 18 km (11 mi)

Basin features
- Progression: Tauanui River → Ruamāhanga River → Lake Ōnoke → Lake Ōnoke Outlet → Palliser Bay → Cook Strait → Pacific Ocean
- Bridges: Tauanui River Bridge (Lake Ferry Road),

The Tauanui River is a river of the South Wairarapa District of the Wellington Region of New Zealand's North Island. It flows northwest from its source in the Aorangi Range to reach the Ruamāhanga River close to the southern end of Lake Wairarapa.

== See also ==
- List of rivers of Wellington Region
- List of rivers of New Zealand
