= Waiorongomai River (Wellington) =

Waiorongomai River Wairongomai River
- Route of the Waiorongomai River
- Mouth of the Waiorongomai River Waiorongomai River (Wellington) (North Island)
- Native name: Waiorongomai (Māori)

Location
- Country: New Zealand
- Island: North Island
- Region: Wellington
- District: South Wairarapa

Physical characteristics
- Source: Remutaka Range
  - location: Between Remutaka Range main ridge and Baw Baw
  - coordinates: 41.2126°S 175.1205°E
  - elevation: 600 metres (2,000 ft)
- Mouth: Lake Wairarapa
  - coordinates: 41°15′30″S 175°10′31″E
  - elevation: 0 m (0 ft)
- Length: 9 km (5.6 mi)

Basin features
- Progression: Waiorongomai River → Lake Wairarapa → Lake Wairarapa Outlet → Ruamāhanga River → Lake Ōnoke → Lake Ōnoke Outlet → Palliser Bay → Cook Strait → Pacific Ocean
- Tributaries
  - right: Oreore Stream
- Bridges: Western Lake Road bridge

The Waiorongomai River is a river of the Wellington Region of New Zealand's North Island. It flows generally east from its sources in the Remutaka Forest Park to reach the southern end of Lake Wairarapa.

== See also ==
- List of rivers of Wellington Region
- List of rivers of New Zealand
