= List of rivers of New Zealand by length =

This is a list of the longest rivers in New Zealand, and some other prominent rivers, ordered by length.

South Island rivers are marked "SI", and North Island rivers "NI".

== The 20 longest rivers ==
Rank	Name	Island	Length (km)	Length (mi)
1	Waikato	North	425	264
2	Clutha / Mata-Au	South	322	200
3	Whanganui	North	290	180
4	Taieri	South	288	179
5	Rangitīkei	North	241	150
6	Mataura	South	240	149
7	Waiau (Southland)	South	217	135
8=	Waiau Toa / Clarence	South	209	130
8=	Waitaki	South	209	130
10	Ōreti	South	203	126
11	Rangitaiki	North	193	120
12	Manawatū	North	182	113
13	Buller / Kawatiri	South	177	110
14	Waihou	North	175	109
15	Mohaka	North	172	107
16=	Waiau Uwha	South	169	105
16=	Wairau	South	169	105
18=	Whangaehu	North	161	100
18=	Waimakariri	South	161	100
20	Mōkau	North	158	98

== Other prominent rivers ==
=== Over 100 kilometres ===
- Ngaruroro River (NI) – 154 km (96 mi)
- Mōtū River (NI) – 147 km (91 mi)
- Rakaia River (SI) – 145 km (90 mi)
- Pātea River (NI) – 143 km (89 mi)
- Hurunui River (SI) – 138 km (86 mi)
- Turakina River (NI) – 137 km (85 mi)
- Wairoa River (Bay of Plenty) (NI) – 137 km (85 mi)
- Wairoa River (Northland) (NI) – 132 km (82 mi)
- Awatere River (SI) – 126 km (78 mi)
- Ruamāhanga River (NI) – 124 km (77 mi)
- Grey River or Mawhera River (SI) – 121 km (75 mi)
- Rangitata River (SI) – 120 km (74 mi)
- Tukituki River (NI) – 119 km (74 mi)
- Motueka River (SI) – 116 km (72 mi)
- Waitaki River (SI) – 111 km (69 mi)
- Aparima River (SI) – 102 km (63 mi)

=== 50 to 100 kilometres ===
- Tūtaekurī River (NI) - 100 km (62 mi)
- Whakatāne River (NI) – 95 km (59 mi)
- Pomahaka River (SI) – 81 km (50 mi)
- Waipaoa River (NI) 80 km (50 mi)
- Selwyn River (SI) 80 km (50 mi)
- Taramakau River (SI) 75 km (46 mi)
- Ōpihi River (SI) – 75 km (46 mi)
- Orari River (SI) – 74 km (46 mi)
- Karamea River (SI) – 73 km (45 mi)
- Ongarue River (NI) – 73 km (45 mi)
- Ahuriri River (SI) – 70 km (43 mi)
- Waioweka River (NI) – 65 km (40 mi)
- Inangahua River (SI) – 65 km (40 mi)
- Moawhango River (NI) – 62 km (38 mi)
- Waitoa River (NI) – 62 km (38 mi)
- Shotover River (SI) – 60 km (37 mi)
- Hutt River (NI) – 56 km (35 mi)
- Ruakituri River (NI) – 55 km (34 mi)
- Manganui River (Northland) (NI) – 53 km (33 mi)
- Whenuakura River (NI) -53 km (33 mi)
- Eglinton River (SI) – 51 km (32 mi)
- Kaituna River (NI) – 50 km (31 mi) (approx)
- Tokomairaro River (SI) – 50 km (31 mi) (approx)

=== Under 50 kilometres ===
- Waingawa River (Wairarapa), a tributary of the Ruamāhanga River – 48 km (13 mi)
- Tauherenikau River (Wairarapa), draining into Lake Wairarapa – 41 km (13 mi)
- Waiohine River (Wairarapa), a tributary of the Ruamāhanga River – 35 km (13 mi)
- Freshwater River (Stewart Island) – 25 km (15 mi) (longest New Zealand river not in the North or South Island)
- Waiwawa River – 21 km (13 mi) (longest river on the Coromandel Peninsula)
- Waimata River (NI) – 20 km (16 mi)
- Makara River (Chatham Island) – 16 km (10 mi) (longest New Zealand river not in New Zealand's main island chain)
- Avon River / Ōtākaro (SI) – 15 km (9.5 mi)
- Water of Leith (SI) – 14 km (9 mi)

== Shortest rivers ==
- Awaroa River (Far North) (Northland) – 12 km (7.5 mi)
- Awaroa River (Waikato River tributary) – 12 km (7.5 mi)
- Tawatahi River (Waikato) – 2 km (1.2 mi)
- Tūranganui River (Gisborne) – 1.2 km (0.75 mi)
- Takiritawai River - 1.01 km (0.63 mi)

== See also ==
- List of rivers of New Zealand
- List of rivers
- List of rivers of Oceania
- List of islands of New Zealand#In rivers and lakes
- List of lakes in New Zealand
