= Kōpuaranga River =

- Route of the Kōpuaranga River
- Mouth of the Kōpuaranga River Kōpuaranga River (North Island)
- Native name: Kōpuaranga (Māori)

Location
- Country: New Zealand
- Island: North Island
- Region: Wellington
- District: South Wairarapa

Physical characteristics
- Source: Pukaha / Mount Bruce
  - coordinates: 40.74017°S 175.64598°E
- Mouth: Ruamāhanga River
  - location: Rathkeale College
  - coordinates: 40°53′44″S 175°41′36″E
- Length: 28 km (17 mi)

Basin features
- Progression: Kōpuaranga River → Ruamāhanga River → Lake Ōnoke → Lake Ōnoke Outlet → Palliser Bay → Cook Strait → Pacific Ocean
- Cities: Mauriceville
- Tributaries
  - left: Punga Stream, Waitapu Stream
- Bridges: Bridge near 2187 Opaki-Kaiparoro Road, Mauriceville Bridge, Camerons Road Bridge, bridge near 1272 Opaki-Kaiparoro Road, Wairarapa Line railway bridge south of Mauriceville, bridge near 1954 Opaki-Kaiparoro Road, Palmer Road Bridge, Wairarapa Line railway bridge at Palmer Road, Knight Road Bridge, Donovans Road Bridge, Bluff Rangitumau Road Bridge,

The Kōpuaranga River is a river of the Wairarapa, in New Zealand's North Island. It flows generally south from rough hill country southwest of Eketāhuna, reaching its outflow into the Ruamāhanga River 5 kilometres (3 mi) north of Masterton.

In December 2019, the approved official geographic name of the river was gazetted as "Kōpuaranga River".

== See also ==
- List of rivers of Wellington Region
- List of rivers of New Zealand
