= Tauweru River =

River in New Zealand

- Route of the Tauweru River
- Mouth of the Tauweru River Tauweru River (North Island)
- Native name: Tauweru (Māori)

Location
- Country: New Zealand
- Island: North Island
- Region: Wellington
- District: Masterton, Carterton

Physical characteristics
- Source
  - coordinates: 40.71968°S 176.04012°E
- Mouth: Ruamāhanga River
  - coordinates: 41°04′03″S 175°38′03″E

Basin features
- Progression: Tauweru River → Ruamāhanga River → Lake Ōnoke → Lake Ōnoke Outlet → Palliser Bay → Cook Strait → Pacific Ocean
- Cities: Bideford, Tauweru, Gladstone
- Tributaries
  - left: Mangapurupuru Stream, Kaumingi Stream, Waipawa Stream, Kerearea Stream, Pōhatu Stream, Ruaruahanga Stream, Kōurarau Stream
  - right: Wainuiomapu Stream, Mangareia Stream, Ruatiki Stream, Waihonga Stream, Mangatopitopi Stream, Taumataria Stream
- Bridges: Alfredton-Tinui Road Bridge, Maringi Road Bridge, Bridge near 263 Coopers Road, Bridge near 134 Coopers Road, Glendonald Road Bridge, Waterfalls Road Bridge, Mangarei Road Bridge, Te Ore Ore-Bideford Road Bridge, Stoddarts Road Bridge, Masterton-Castlepoint Road Bridge, Masterton Stronvar Road Bridge, Te Whiti Road Bridge

The Tauweru River, sometimes called the Taueru River, is a river in the Wairarapa region of New Zealand's North Island. It drains from the pastoral eastern highlands of the Wairarapa and joins the Ruamāhanga River just north of the Gladstone Road bridge into Gladstone, southeast of Carterton.

== Etymology ==
The river's name is Māori for "hanging in clusters" and named after it is the town of Tauweru, located along the middle reaches of the river east of Masterton.

== Geography ==
The river itself is slow and sluggish, flowing in a willow-lined, restricted and gravel-less channel. A group of local farmers, the Mid-Tauweru Landcare Group, was established in 2000 to facilitate sound management of the river's riparian zone by replacing willows with native plants to enhance the river's flow and biodiversity. Its catchment east of Masterton is extensive and fishing conditions in the lower three kilometres of the river are considered to be excellent, especially in summer.
