= Dry River (Wellington) =

- Route of the Dry River
- Mouth of the Dry River Dry River (Wellington) (North Island)

Location
- Country: New Zealand
- Island: North Island
- Region: Wellington
- District: South Wairarapa

Physical characteristics
- Source: Aorangi Forest Park
  - coordinates: 41.34466°S 175.3309°E
- Mouth: Ruamāhanga River
  - coordinates: 41°14′39″S 175°22′45″E

Basin features
- Progression: Dry River → Ruamāhanga River → Lake Ōnoke → Lake Ōnoke Outlet → Palliser Bay → Cook Strait → Pacific Ocean
- Cities: Dyerville
- Bridges: Dry River Bridge (Lake Ferry Road)

The Dry River is a river in the extreme southeast of the North Island of New Zealand. It feeds into the Ruamāhanga River to the southwest of Martinborough. The headwaters are in the Aorangi Forest Park, and its eventual outflow (via the Ruamāhanga River) is into Cook Strait at Palliser Bay.

Dry River was the name of a sheep station about 1877, which later was renamed Dyerville. A vineyard called Dry River was established in the area in 1979.

== See also ==
- List of rivers of Wellington Region
- List of rivers of New Zealand
