= Whangaehu River (Wellington) =

- Route of the Whangaehu River
- Mouth of the Whangaehu River Whangaehu River (Wellington) (North Island)
- Native name: Whangaehu (Māori)

Location
- Country: New Zealand
- Island: North Island
- Region: Wellington
- District: Masterton

Physical characteristics
- Source
  - coordinates: 40.73295°S 175.76614°E
- Mouth: Ruamāhanga River
  - coordinates: 40°59′18″S 175°41′21″E

Basin features
- Progression: Whangaehu River → Ruamāhanga River → Lake Ōnoke → Lake Ōnoke Outlet → Palliser Bay → Cook Strait → Pacific Ocean
- Tributaries
  - left: Te Mangarangi Huareka Stream
  - right: Wairorouaro Creek, Mangaruata Stream, Mangakina Stream, Poterau Stream
- Bridges: Dreyers Rock Road Bridge, Whangaerhu River Bridge (Whangaehu Valley Road), Whangaerhu River Bridge (Whangaehu Valley Road near Ditton Road), Bridge near 411 Whangaehu Valley Road, Bridge near 374 Whangaehu Valley Road, Whangaerhu River Bridge (Te Ore Ore-Bideford Road), Te Ore Ore Settlement Road Bridge, Masterton-Castlepoint Road Bridge, Masterton Stronvar Road Bridge

The Whangaehu River is a river of the Wellington Region of New Zealand's North Island. It flows south from the northernmost part of the Masterton District, reaching the Ruamāhanga River southeast of Masterton.

== See also ==
- List of rivers of Wellington Region
- List of rivers of New Zealand
