= Wairarapa Moana Wetlands =

Wetland in the Wellington Region of New Zealand

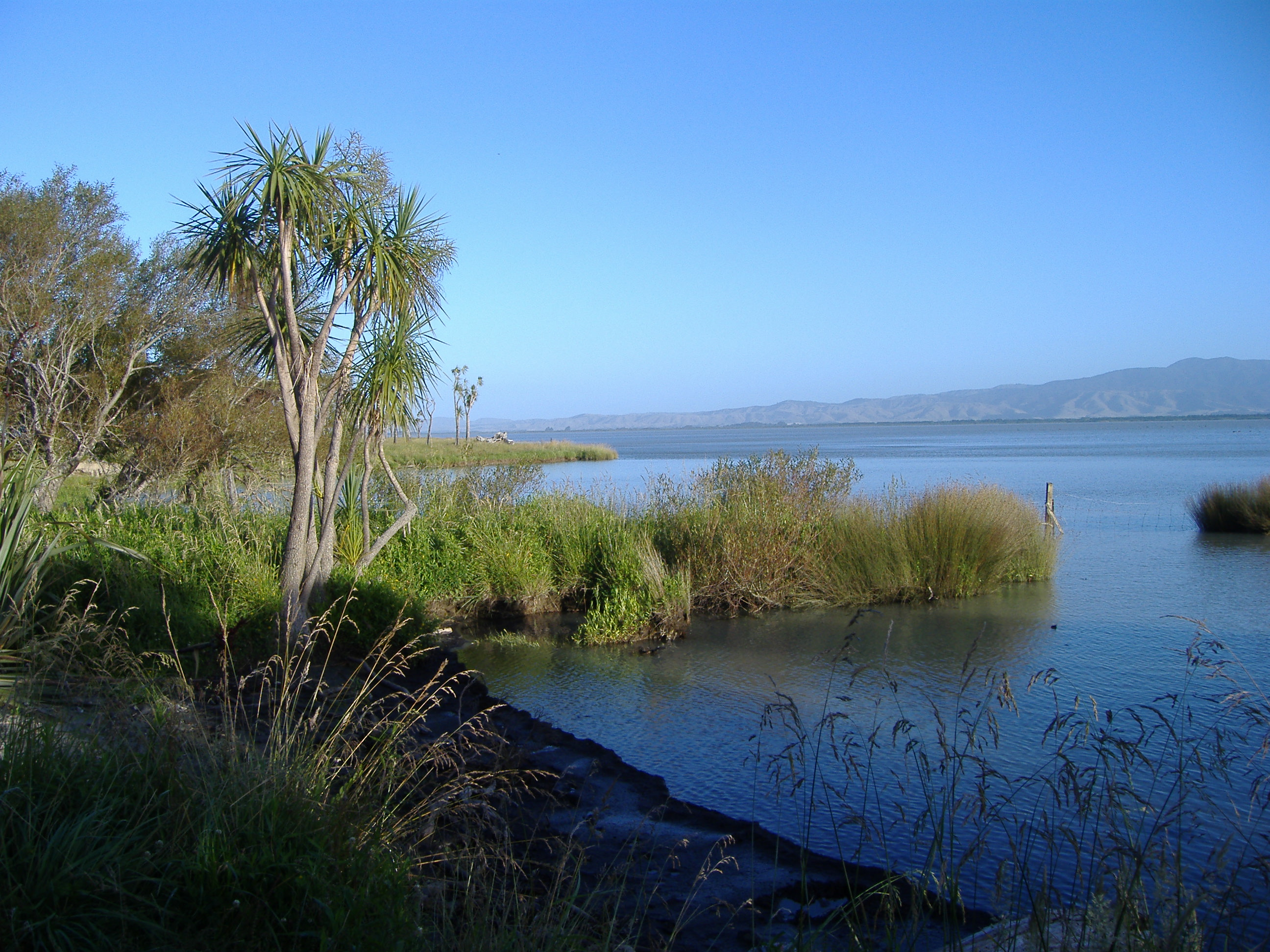
- Western shore of Lake Wairarapa
- Interactive map of Wairarapa Moana Wetlands
- Type: Reserve
- Location: South Wairarapa District, Wellington Region, New Zealand
- Coordinates: 41.2339913°S 175.1930894°E
- Area: 9,000 hectares (22,000 acres)
- Operator: Wellington Regional Council
- Open: 24 hours
- Status: Open
- Website: waiwetlands.org.nz

The Wairarapa Moana Wetlands are a group of lakes and wetlands, located in the South Wairarapa District in the Wellington Region at the southern end of New Zealand's North Island. The wetland area includes Lake Wairarapa and the Wairarapa Lake Shore Scenic Reserve, Lake Ōnoke and Ōnoke Spit, and wetland areas around the lakes.

The wetland is the largest in the lower North Island, one of the largest in New Zealand, and was recognised as a wetland of international significance under the Ramsar Convention in August 2020. It covers an area of 9,000 hectares (22,000 acres), with the largest part being Lake Wairarapa at 7,800 hectares (19,000 acres).

The wetland is administered by Wellington Regional Council, in conjunction with Kahungunu ki Wairarapa, the Department of Conservation, South Wairarapa District Council, and Rangitāne o Wairarapa.

== Geography ==
The area has a range of wetlands, including sedgelands, open water and lagoons, lakeshore mudflats, saltmarsh and ephemeral wetlands. Raupō (bullrush) grows up to three metres tall. The main Lake Wairarapa is relatively shallow, with a depth of about 2.5 metres.

In the lake and wetlands, there are populations of tuna kūwharuwharu (longfin eels), tuna hao (shortfin eels), toitoi (common bully), īnanga, kanae (yellow eyed mullet), kākahi (freshwater mussel), mohoao (black flounder), waikaka or hauhau (brown mudfish), kōuru (freshwater crayfish), panoko (torrentfish), giant kōkopu and redfin bully.

The area is a habitat for a range of birds, including matuku (Australasian bittern), kuaka (bar-tailed godwit), pohowera (banded dotterel), taranui (caspian tern), weweia (New Zealand dabchick), pūwheto (spotless crake), kawau (black shag), tarāpuka (black-billed gull), kuriri (Pacific golden plover), pūtangitangi (paradise shelduck), kōtuku ngutupapa (royal spoonbill) and poaka (pied stilt).

== History ==
=== Pre-European history ===
The name Wairarapa means "glistening waters" in the Māori language. According to some oral histories, the Polynesian explorer Kupe named the wetlands after touching down in the area several times. According to other oral histories, explorer Haunui named the wetlands after the way the lake appeared to glisten from the Remutaka Ranges to the west.

Rangitāne began settling in the region in the 15th century. Ngāti Ira also settled in the wetlands before moving to the Wellington Harbour. Ngāti Kahungunu came later and were in regular conflict with Rangitāne until a political agreement was reached in the 17th century.

The wetlands became an important place to gather food and plant material. The area became known for its abundance of tuna (eel), as well as plentiful inanga (whitebait) and kōkopu (freshwater fish).

During the early 19th century, Ngāti Whātua and Ngāti Maniapoto took control of parts of the area. Taranaki invaded. Ngāti Tama settled on the western shore in a short-lived alliance with Rangitāne. Many Rangitāne and Ngāti Kahungunu fled the area, until a peace agreement signed at Pito-one in 1840 allowed them to return.

=== European settlement ===
The first European sighting of the wetlands was by James Cook in 1777. Georg Forster, a naturalist on Cook's ship, said it was the "“most convenient spot for European settlement", with extensive land suitable for cultivation.

European farmers established sheep and cattle stations in the wetlands in 1844, including the first extensive sheep station in New Zealand. Many early farmers struggled with mosquitoes and floods, and relied on purchasing food from their Māori landlords.

In 1872, farmers petitioned the Government to purchase the wetlands and control the summer and autumn floods. The wetland's Māori owners wanted the high waters to continue, to allow for a harvest of the highly prized taonga of eels. The Government rejected the campaign, and in 1882 the Native Land Court confirmed Māori ownership of the area.

From 1886, farmers under police escort began opening the outlet to stop seasonal flooding. They continued do so after an 1891 Royal Commission of Enquiry confirmed Māori ownership, and after Piripi Te Maari and other local Māori began peacefully protesting the opening in 1892. The dispute was not resolved until local Māori gifted the lake and wetland to the Government in 1896. In return, Māori retained rights over the water and fisheries, and were promised a lakeside reserve they never received.

During the early 20th century, there were ongoing disputes between farmers about how to dam and flood properties. After major floods in June 1947, authorities began to extensively drain the wetlands.

=== Initial restoration ===
Plans to drain Lake Wairarapa were abandoned in 1989. A National Water Conservation Order, issued in 1989, recognised minimum water levels should be maintained to protect native habitats and wildlife. An oversight committee was established which recognised the wetland's spiritual and cultural significance to Māori people.

Several further steps were taken to protect the wetland, including the establishment of legal protections under the Resource Management Act in 1991, the development of an action plan by the Department of Conservation in 2000, the establishment of a clean streams accord by Fonterra in 2003, and the conversion of 130 hectares (320 acres) of marginal farmland to wetlands in 2004.

=== Wairarapa Moana Wetlands Project ===
The current coordinated wetland restoration project began in 2008. The project aims to restore the wetland, which has been heavily polluted with high levels of nitrogen and phosphorus and has been facing erosion and sedimentation.

The Government announced $3.5 million in funding towards wetland restoration in July 2020. Wellington Regional Council contributed $1 million, and the Department of Conservation an additional $450,000.

Almost 13,000 plants were planted in winter 2020, but many did not survive in the dry and exposed conditions.

Wairarapa Moana was recognised as a wetland of international significance under the Ramsar Convention in August 2020. It was the seventh New Zealand wetland to receive the recognition.

Restorative plantings were damaged or uprooted in September 2020.

An open day was held in the park in March 2021.

=== Predator control ===
In 2023, the Greater Wellington Regional Council reported that since the installation of a network of predator traps in 2013, they had removed hundreds of ferrets, feral cats and mice, and thousands of hedgehogs and rats. Control of these predators has been linked to increasing populations of the nationally critical Australasian bittern or matuku hūrepo.

== Recreation ==
The Wairarapa Moana Wetlands has walking tracks, there are cycling routes around the lake, and there are several spots for bird-watching, kayaking, windsurfing and fishing. Swimming can also be safe away from the sea, provided there has been no heavy rain in the past 48 hours.

The park can be accessed via a road from Featherston and is open 24 hours a day.

Dogs are permitted, but must be kept under control and away from bird nesting areas. Fireworks are not permitted.
