= Tūranganui River =

Turanganui River or Tūranganui River may refer to:

- Tūranganui River (Gisborne)
- Tūranganui River (Wellington)
