= Waingawa River =

River in New Zealand

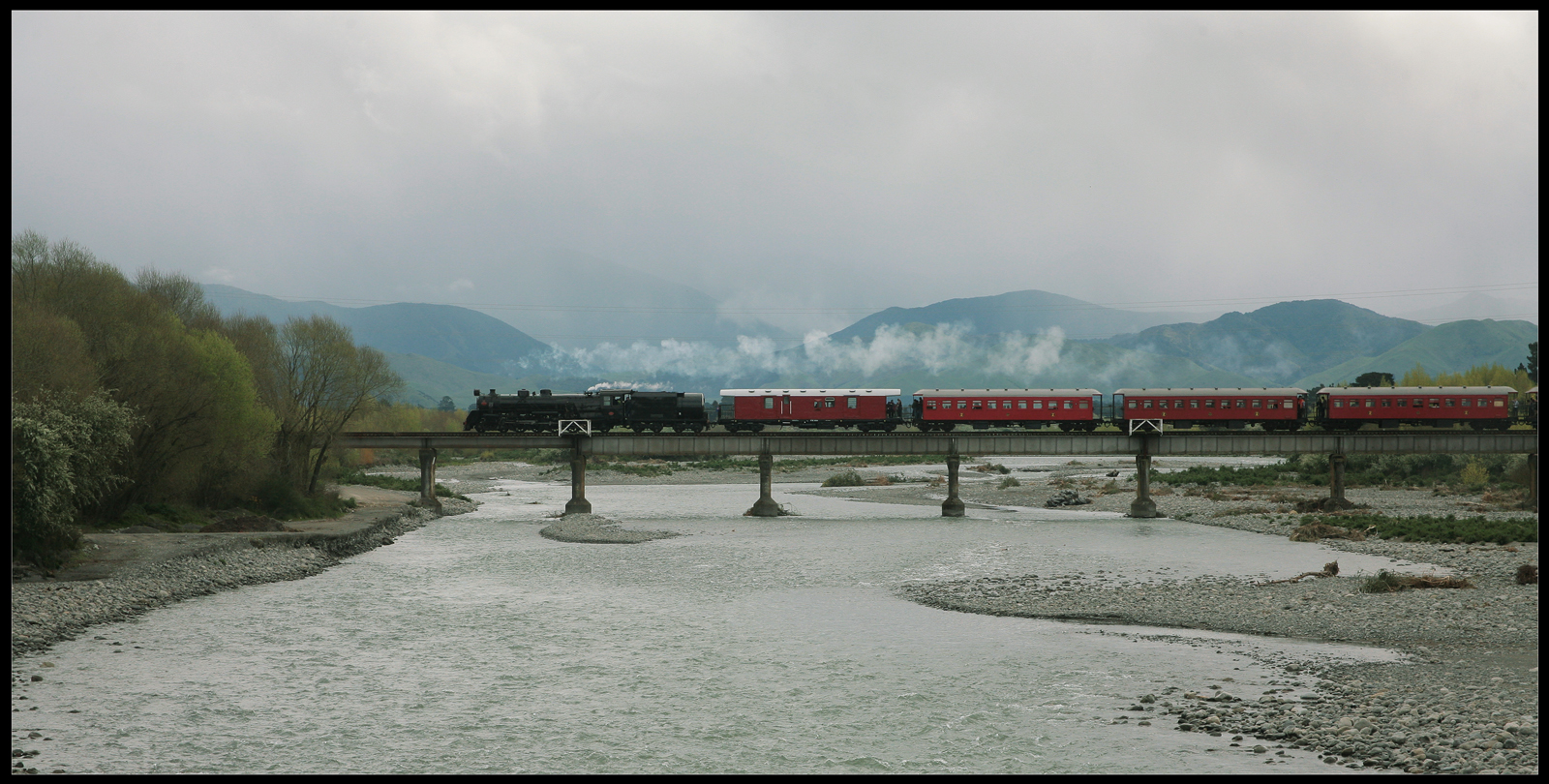
- Waingawa railway bridge and the foothills of the Tararuas in November 2017. The bridge entered service in November 1880
- Route of the Waingawa River
- Mouth of the Waingawa River Waingawa River (North Island)
- Native name: Waiāwangawanga (Māori)

Location
- Country: New Zealand
- Island: North Island
- Region: Wellington
- District: Masterton, Carterton

Physical characteristics
- Source: Girdlestone, Tarn Ridge, Tararua Range
  - coordinates: 40.7958°S 175.4427°E
- Mouth: Ruamāhanga River
  - location: Te Whiti
  - coordinates: 41°00′23″S 175°39′53″E
- Length: 48 km (30 mi)

Basin features
- Progression: Waingawa River → Ruamāhanga River → Lake Ōnoke → Lake Ōnoke Outlet → Palliser Bay → Cook Strait → Pacific Ocean
- Cities: Masterton (Solway), Waingawa
- Tributaries
  - left: Arete Stream, Cow Creek, Donald Stream, Stoney Creek, Blake Stream, Black Creek
  - right: North Mitre Stream, Peggy Stream, South Mitre Stream, Fall Stream, Te Whakatūrākau Stream
- Bridges: Cow Creek Hut Bridge, Mitre Flats Hut Bridge, The Pines Bridge, Waingawa Railway Bridge (Wairarapa Line), Waingawa River Bridge (State Highway 2)

The Waingawa River is a river of the Greater Wellington Region of New Zealand's North Island and a major tributary of the Ruamāhanga River.

== Etymology ==
The name Waingawa used to be Waiāwangawanga, wai meaning water and wangawanga meaning uncertain or troubled. By legend the river was named by Haunui-a-nanaia who also named many other parts of the Wairarapa. The river's name is eventually supposed to be corrected as part of a treaty settlement process with Rangitane and Kahungunu but as of 2021 the river's official name remains Waingawa.

== Geography ==
Its origins are close to Pukeamoamo / Mitre, the highest peak of the Tararua Range. Once out of the ranges it flows in a straight line southeast across the Wairarapa Valley to join the Ruamāhanga River at Te Whiti by Wardell's Bridge. The Waingawa River is the southwestern boundary of the town of Masterton, and form much of the boundary between the Masterton District and Carterton District.

Masterton's water is piped from the Waingawa through a Masterton District Council treatment plant on the river about 10 km (6.2 mi) west of the town.

== See also ==
- List of rivers of Wellington Region
- List of rivers of New Zealand
