= Te Whiti =

Te Whiti may refer to:

- Te Whiti, New Zealand, a community in the Wairarapa region
- Te Whiti o Rongomai, a Māori spiritual leader
