= Te Whiti, New Zealand =

Coordinates: 41.03°S 175.67°E

Te Whiti, formerly Te Whiti o Tu in the nineteenth century, is a rural community in the Masterton District of the Wairarapa region of New Zealand's North Island. It is about 6 kilometres (3.7 mi) north of Gladstone, 12 kilometres (7.5 mi) south of Masterton and east of Carterton. It runs from Wardells Bridge over the Ruamāhanga River just upstream from its confluence with the Waingawa River, where the Wardell family farm is called "Te Whiti", south to the Tauweru River, which forms the boundary between Masterton District and Carterton District. The Ruamāhanga River runs north and west of the area, and the Tauweru River flows across the south of Te Whiti. Nearby communities include Te Whanga to the east and Gladstone and Longbush to the south. The Maungaraki Range is also nearby.

The name "Te Whiti" means "the place of crossing" in the Māori language, reflecting its location near a natural crossing of the Ruamāhanga River where it is met by the Waingawa River. Te Whiti is one of the oldest settled locations in the Wairarapa, established prior to Masterton by Hugh McKenzie in the early 1850s.

Te Whiti primary school opened at the corner of Te Whiti Road and Te Whiti Settlement Road on 16 June 1885 with Henry Lillington as schoolmaster. Sylvia Ashton-Warner's older sister Grace became the teacher in 1919. Sylvia became 'dux' of the school, then Grace took her to live in Wellington, to attend Wellington Girls' College, but due to financial constraints Sylvia moved back to Te Whiti. Her mother Margaret became the teacher in 1920. Sylvia commuted 11 miles (18 km) by horse and bicycle to attend Masterton District High School. A house for the teacher was built in 1954. Te Whiti school closed in 1968 and students sent to Gladstone; the school buildings remained for use by community groups until 2000.

Te Whiti's identity has been threatened in the twentieth century by attempts to subsume it under Gladstone.
