= Pirinoa =

Rural locality in the Wellington Region, New Zealand

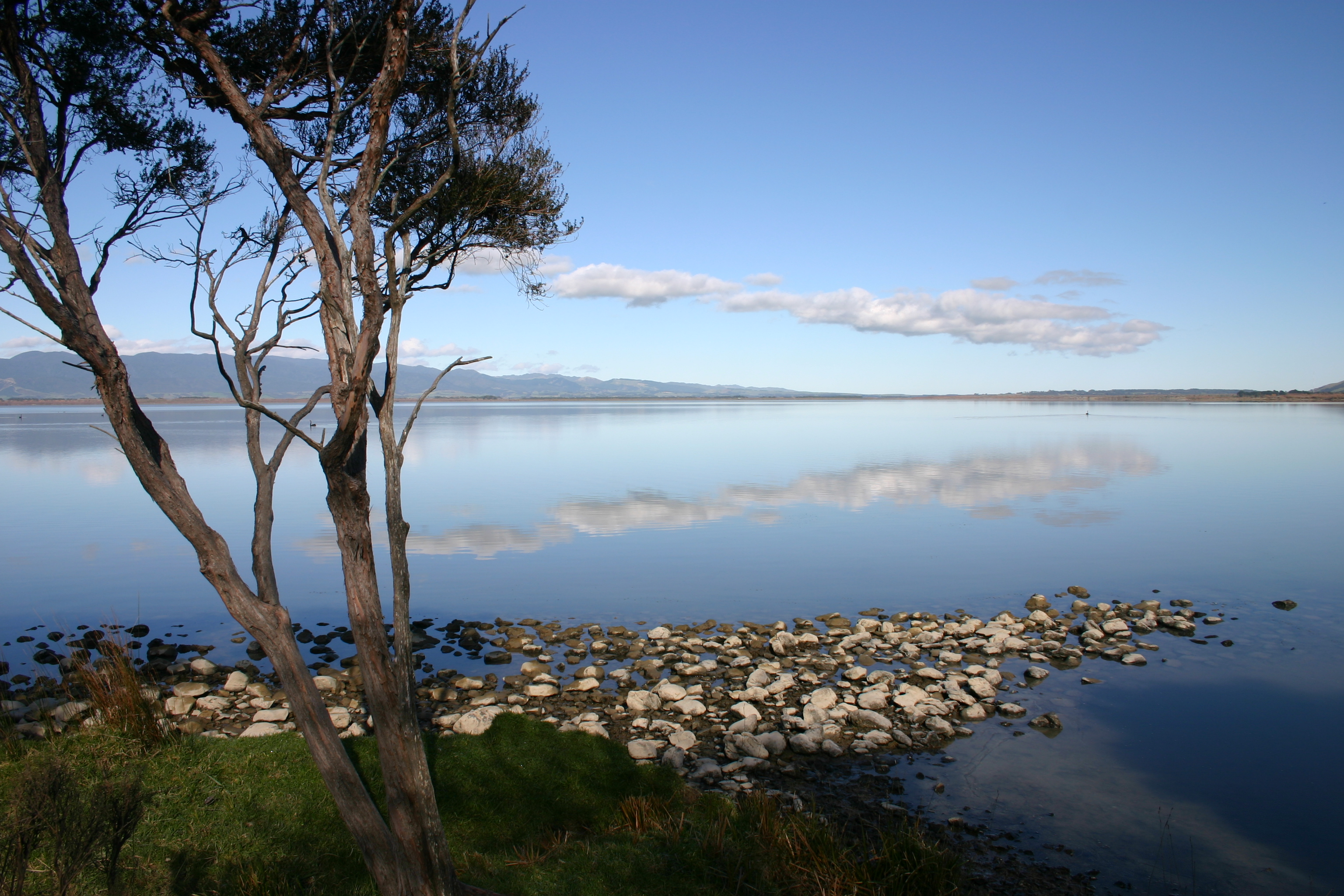
- The Pirinoa landscape behind Lake Wairarapa
- Interactive map of Pirinoa
- Coordinates: 41.352730°S 175.205529°E
- Region: Wellington Region
- Territorial authority: South Wairarapa District
- Ward: Martinborough Ward
- Community: Martinborough Community
- Electorates: Wairarapa; Ikaroa-Rāwhiti (Māori)

Government
  - Territorial Authority: South Wairarapa District Council
  - Regional council: Greater Wellington Regional Council
  - Mayor of South Wairarapa: Fran Wilde
  - Wairarapa MP: Mike Butterick
  - Ikaroa-Rāwhiti MP: Cushla Tangaere-Manuel

Area
  - Total: 68.89 km^{2} (26.60 sq mi)

Population (2023 Census)
  - Total: 273
  - Density: 3.96/km^{2} (10.3/sq mi)
- Time zone: UTC+12 (NZST)
  - Summer (DST): UTC+13 (NZDT)
- Area code: 04

Pirinoa is a rural community east of Lake Wairarapa, in the South Wairarapa District and Wellington Region of New Zealand's North Island. It includes the rural settlement of Pirinoa, and the coastal settlement of Whāngaimoana.

== Marae ==
Kohunui Marae, located in Pirinoa, is a tribal meeting ground for the Ngāti Kahungunu hapū of Ngāi Rangawhakairi, Ngāti Rākairangi and Ngāti Tūkoko, and the Rangitāne hapū of Ngāti Tūkoko. It has a wharenui or meeting house, called Te Tihi o Tuhirangi.

In October 2020, the Government committed $2,179,654 from the Provincial Growth Fund to upgrade Ngāi Tumapuhia a Rangi ki Okautete, Motuwairaka, Pāpāwai, Kohunui, Hurunui o Rangi and Te Oreore marae. The projects were expected to create 19.8 full time jobs.

== Demographics ==
Pirinoa locality, including Lake Ferry, covers 68.89 km^{2} (26.60 sq mi). It is part of the larger Aorangi Forest statistical area.

Historical population for Pirinoa locality
Year	Pop.	±% p.a.
2006	243	—
2013	225	−1.09%
2018	225	+0.00%
2023	273	+3.94%

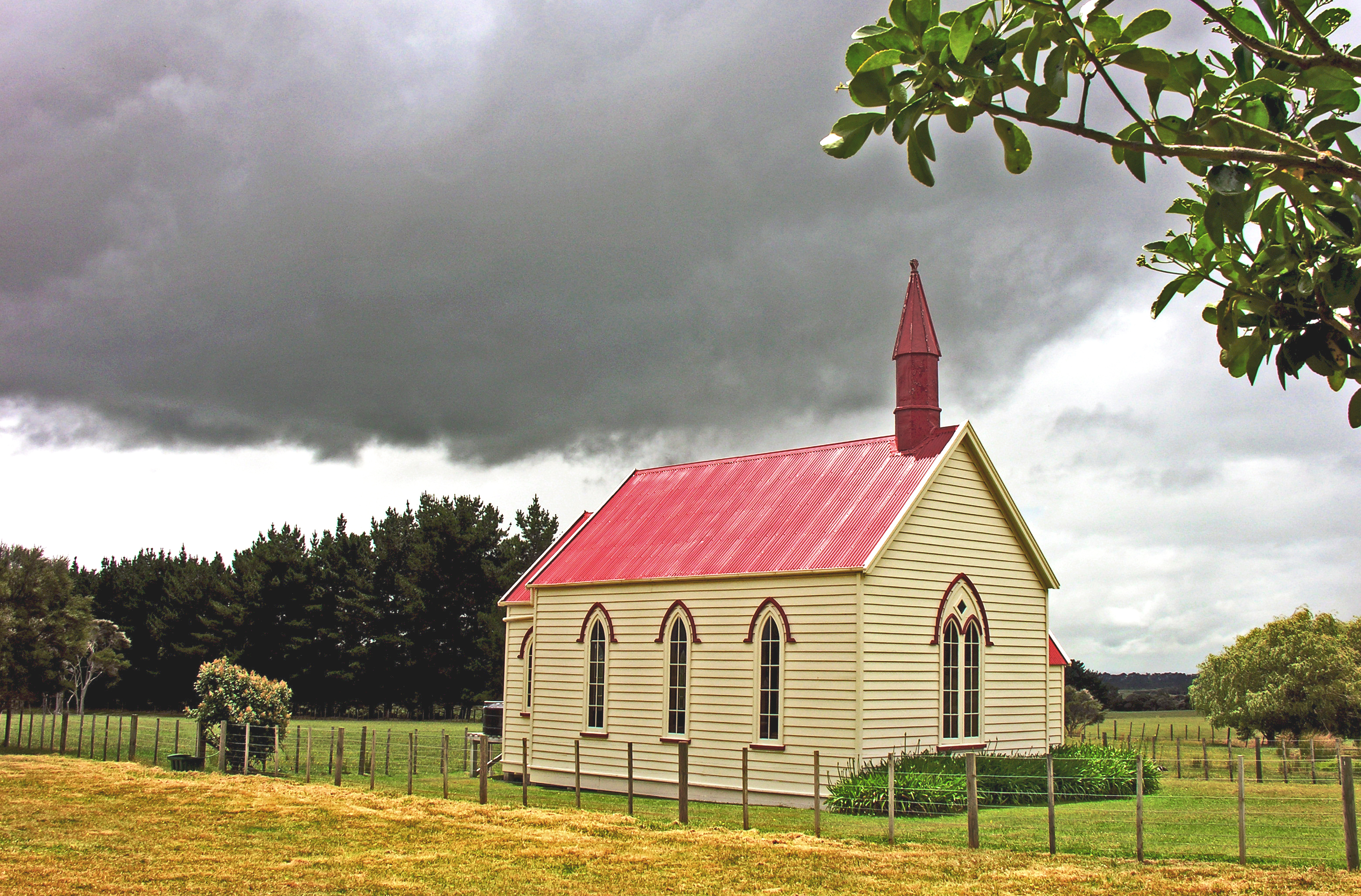
Burnside Church east of Pirinoa

Pirinoa had a population of 273 in the 2023 New Zealand census, an increase of 48 people (21.3%) since the 2018 census, and an increase of 48 people (21.3%) since the 2013 census. There were 138 males, 129 females, and 3 people of other genders in 105 dwellings. 3.3% of people identified as LGBTIQ+. There were 51 people (18.7%) aged under 15 years, 57 (20.9%) aged 15 to 29, 105 (38.5%) aged 30 to 64, and 54 (19.8%) aged 65 or older.

People could identify as more than one ethnicity. The results were 81.3% European (Pākehā), 37.4% Māori, 3.3% Pasifika, 3.3% Asian, and 4.4% other, which includes people giving their ethnicity as "New Zealander". English was spoken by 98.9%, Māori by 6.6%, and other languages by 1.1%. No language could be spoken by 1.1% (e.g. too young to talk). New Zealand Sign Language was known by 1.1%. The percentage of people born overseas was 5.5, compared with 28.8% nationally.

Religious affiliations were 29.7% Christian, and 1.1% Māori religious beliefs. People who answered that they had no religion were 63.7%, and 4.4% of people did not answer the census question.

Of those at least 15 years old, 36 (16.2%) people had a bachelor's or higher degree, 138 (62.2%) had a post-high school certificate or diploma, and 48 (21.6%) people exclusively held high school qualifications. 15 people (6.8%) earned over $100,000 compared to 12.1% nationally. The employment status of those at least 15 was 114 (51.4%) full-time, 45 (20.3%) part-time, and 6 (2.7%) unemployed.

=== Aorangi Forest statistical area ===
Aorangi Forest statistical area, which surrounds but does not include Martinborough and extends south to Cape Palliser, covers 1,578.96 km^{2} (609.64 sq mi) and had an estimated population of 1,690 as of June 2025, with a population density of 1.1 people per km^{2}.

Historical population for Aorangi Forest
Year	Pop.	±% p.a.
2006	1,209	—
2013	1,350	+1.59%
2018	1,407	+0.83%
2023	1,641	+3.12%
The 2006 population is for a larger area of 1,579.08 km^{2}. Source:

Aorangi Forest had a population of 1,641 in the 2023 New Zealand census, an increase of 234 people (16.6%) since the 2018 census, and an increase of 291 people (21.6%) since the 2013 census. There were 873 males, 762 females, and 3 people of other genders in 696 dwellings. 3.3% of people identified as LGBTIQ+. The median age was 49.3 years (compared with 38.1 years nationally). There were 252 people (15.4%) aged under 15 years, 228 (13.9%) aged 15 to 29, 801 (48.8%) aged 30 to 64, and 360 (21.9%) aged 65 or older.

People could identify as more than one ethnicity. The results were 90.9% European (Pākehā); 17.6% Māori; 1.3% Pasifika; 1.5% Asian; 0.4% Middle Eastern, Latin American and African New Zealanders (MELAA); and 2.7% other, which includes people giving their ethnicity as "New Zealander". English was spoken by 98.4%, Māori by 2.7%, and other languages by 6.0%. No language could be spoken by 1.1% (e.g. too young to talk). New Zealand Sign Language was known by 0.5%. The percentage of people born overseas was 14.6, compared with 28.8% nationally.

Religious affiliations were 27.2% Christian, 0.5% Māori religious beliefs, 0.4% Buddhist, 0.2% New Age, and 0.4% other religions. People who answered that they had no religion were 64.9%, and 6.4% of people did not answer the census question.

Of those at least 15 years old, 384 (27.6%) people had a bachelor's or higher degree, 768 (55.3%) had a post-high school certificate or diploma, and 243 (17.5%) people exclusively held high school qualifications. The median income was $46,400, compared with $41,500 nationally. 222 people (16.0%) earned over $100,000 compared to 12.1% nationally. The employment status of those at least 15 was 753 (54.2%) full-time, 234 (16.8%) part-time, and 21 (1.5%) unemployed.

== Education ==
Pirinoa School is a co-educational state primary school for Year 1 to 8 students, with a roll of 36 as of July 2026. It opened in 1887.
