= Tūranganui River (Wellington) =

- Route of the Tūranganui River
- Mouth of the Tūranganui River Tūranganui River (Wellington) (North Island)
- Native name: Tūranganui (Māori)

Location
- Country: New Zealand
- Island: North Island
- Region: Wellington
- District: South Wairarapa

Physical characteristics
- Source: Tūranganui River West Branch
  - location: Te Maunga
  - coordinates: 41.40282°S 175.33055°E
- 2nd source: Tūranganui River East Branch
  - location: Tūranganui
  - coordinates: 41.41332°S 175.37094°E
- Mouth: Lake Ōnoke / Ruamāhanga River
  - coordinates: 41°22′11″S 175°08′37″E
- Length: 24 km (15 mi)

Basin features
- Progression: Tūranganui River → Ruamāhanga River → Lake Ōnoke → Lake Ōnoke Outlet → Palliser Bay → Cook Strait → Pacific Ocean
- Bridges: Te Rata Road Bridge, Tūranganui River Bridge

The Tūranganui River is a river of the Wellington Region, the southernmost region of the North Island of New Zealand. It flows through the south Wairarapa from its source in the Aorangi Range to reach both the Ruamāhanga River and Lake Ōnoke, shortly before the latter's outflow into Palliser Bay.

In December 2019, the approved official geographic name of the river was gazetted as "Tūranganui River".

The New Zealand Ministry for Culture and Heritage gives a translation of "great standing place" for Tūranganui.

== See also ==
- List of rivers of Wellington Region
- List of rivers of New Zealand
