= Bideford, New Zealand =

Bideford
- Interactive map of Bideford
- Coordinates: 40°53′S 175°53′E
- Country: New Zealand
- Region: Wairarapa
- Territorial authority: Masterton District
- Electorates: Wairarapa; Ikaroa-Rāwhiti (Māori)

Government
  - Territorial Authority: Masterton District Council
  - Regional council: Greater Wellington Regional Council
  - Mayor of Masterton: Bex Johnson
  - Wairarapa MP: Mike Butterick
  - Ikaroa-Rāwhiti MP: Cushla Tangaere-Manuel

Area
  - Total: 161.37 km^{2} (62.31 sq mi)

Population (2023 census)
  - Total: 147
  - Density: 0.911/km^{2} (2.36/sq mi)
- Time zone: UTC+12 (NZST)
  - Summer (DST): UTC+13 (NZDT)
- Area code: 06

Bideford is a small rural settlement, located in the Masterton district in the Wairarapa region of the North Island of New Zealand. The town is located 35 kilometres northeast of Masterton and a similar distance southwest of Eketāhuna. Bideford had a primary school until the Wairarapa school merge of 2004.

== Name ==
The settlement is named after Bideford, Devon, and was previously known as Upper Taueru until 1878.

== Demographics ==
Bideford locality has an area of 161.37 km^{2} (62.31 sq mi), which also includes Tauweru. It is part of the larger Whareama statistical area.

Historical population
Year	Pop.	±% p.a.
2006	126	—
2013	144	+1.93%
2018	147	+0.41%
2023	147	+0.00%

Bideford had a population of 147 in the 2023 New Zealand census, unchanged since the 2018 census, and an increase of 3 people (2.1%) since the 2013 census. There were 78 males and 72 females in 57 dwellings. The median age was 41.8 years (compared with 38.1 years nationally). There were 39 people (26.5%) aged under 15 years, 12 (8.2%) aged 15 to 29, 66 (44.9%) aged 30 to 64, and 30 (20.4%) aged 65 or older.

People could identify as more than one ethnicity. The results were 95.9% European (Pākehā), 18.4% Māori, 4.1% Pasifika, and 8.2% other, which includes people giving their ethnicity as "New Zealander". English was spoken by 98.0%, Samoan by 2.0%, and other languages by 8.2%. No language could be spoken by 2.0% (e.g. too young to talk). New Zealand Sign Language was known by 2.0%. The percentage of people born overseas was 16.3, compared with 28.8% nationally.

The sole religious affiliation given was 26.5% Christian. People who answered that they had no religion were 67.3%, and 6.1% of people did not answer the census question.

Of those at least 15 years old, 27 (25.0%) people had a bachelor's or higher degree, 60 (55.6%) had a post-high school certificate or diploma, and 27 (25.0%) people exclusively held high school qualifications. The median income was $36,800, compared with $41,500 nationally. 9 people (8.3%) earned over $100,000 compared to 12.1% nationally. The employment status of those at least 15 was 57 (52.8%) full-time, 15 (13.9%) part-time, and 6 (5.6%) unemployed.

== Residents ==
- John Falloon, Member of Parliament lived in Bideford at the time of his death.
- Jack Williams, Member of Parliament farmed in Bideford

== See also ==
- List of towns in New Zealand
- Regions of New Zealand
