= Whareama =

Rural locality in Wellington Region, New Zealand

- Locality
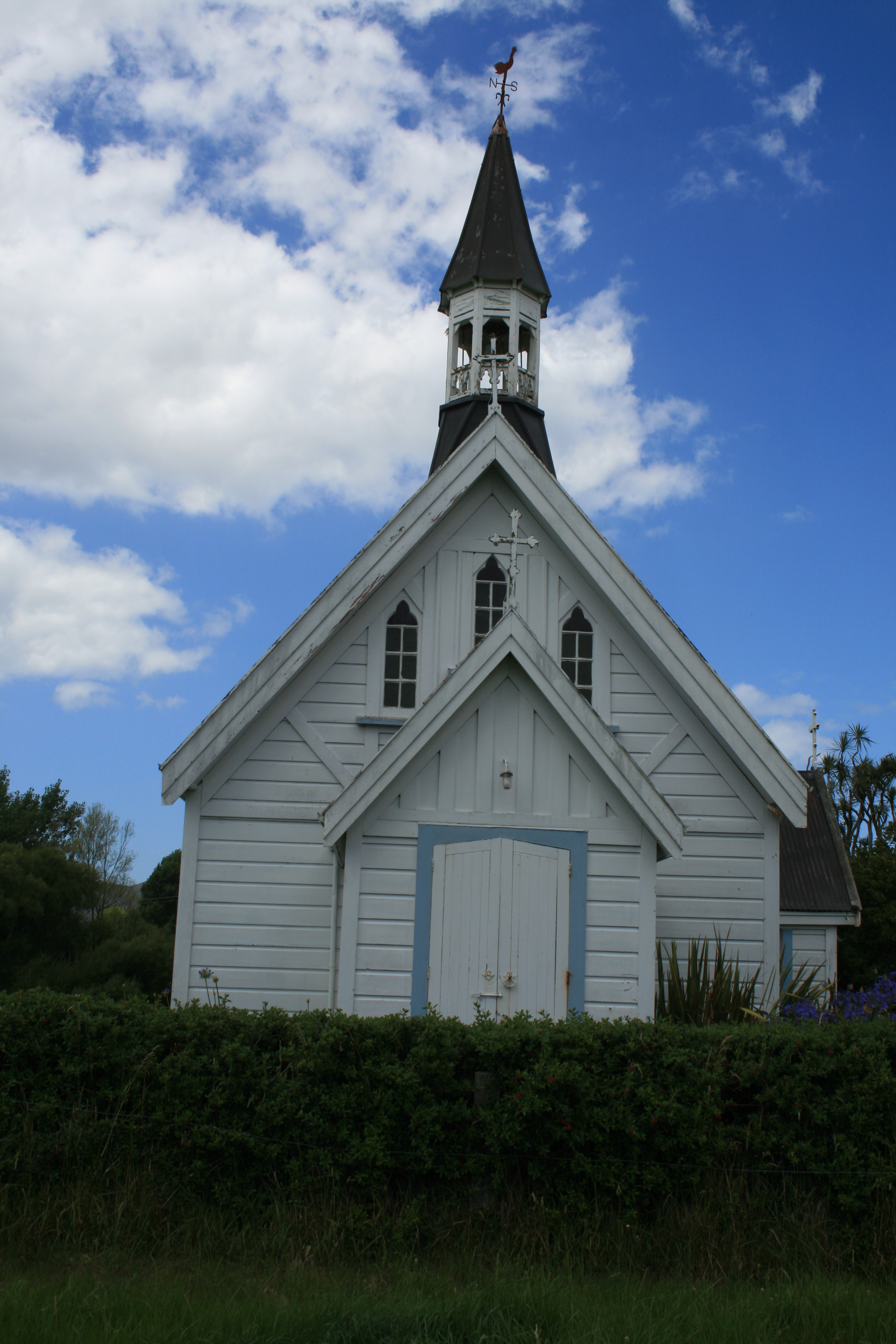
- 19th century Anglican Church at Whareama
- Interactive map of Whareama
- Coordinates: 40.956°S 176.037°E
- Country: New Zealand
- Region: Wellington Region
- Territorial authority: Masterton District
- Ward: Masterton/Whakaoriori General Ward; Masterton/Whakaoriori Māori Ward
- Electorates: Wairarapa; Ikaroa-Rāwhiti (Māori)

Government
  - Territorial Authority: Masterton District Council
  - Regional council: Greater Wellington Regional Council
  - Mayor of Masterton: Bex Johnson
  - Wairarapa MP: Mike Butterick
  - Ikaroa-Rāwhiti MP: Cushla Tangaere-Manuel

Area
  - Total: 1,596.08 km^{2} (616.25 sq mi)

Population (June 2025)
  - Total: 1,500
  - Density: 0.94/km^{2} (2.4/sq mi)

Whareama is a rural area in the Wellington Region of New Zealand's North Island. The Whareama River flows through the area.

== Marae ==
The community has two marae affiliated with the Ngāti Kahungunu hapū of Ngāi Tumapuhia-a-Rangi: Motuwairaka Marae, which lost its meeting house to fire in 2017, and Ngāi Tumapuhia a Rangi ki Okautete Marae, which is still constructing its meeting house by 2020.

In October 2020, the Government committed $2,179,654 from the Provincial Growth Fund to upgrade both marae, alongside Pāpāwai, Kohunui, Hurunui o Rangi and Te Oreore marae. Together, the upgrades were expected to create 19.8 full time jobs.

== Demographics ==
Whareama statistical area covers 1,596.08 km^{2} (616.25 sq mi) and also includes Bideford, Castlepoint, Riversdale Beach, Tauweru, Tīnui and Wainuioru. It had an estimated population of 1,500 as of June 2025, with a population density of 0.94 people per km^{2}.

Historical population
| Year | Pop. | ±% p.a. |
|---|---|---|
| 2006 | 1,290 | — |
| 2013 | 1,281 | −0.10% |
| 2018 | 1,410 | +1.94% |
| 2023 | 1,431 | +0.30% |

Whareama had a population of 1,431 in the 2023 New Zealand census, an increase of 21 people (1.5%) since the 2018 census, and an increase of 150 people (11.7%) since the 2013 census. There were 753 males, 669 females, and 3 people of other genders in 603 dwellings. 1.5% of people identified as LGBTIQ+. The median age was 47.3 years (compared with 38.1 years nationally). There were 246 people (17.2%) aged under 15 years, 201 (14.0%) aged 15 to 29, 672 (47.0%) aged 30 to 64, and 312 (21.8%) aged 65 or older.

People could identify as more than one ethnicity. The results were 93.9% European (Pākehā); 16.8% Māori; 2.7% Pasifika; 1.0% Asian; 0.2% Middle Eastern, Latin American and African New Zealanders (MELAA); and 2.1% other, which includes people giving their ethnicity as "New Zealander". English was spoken by 98.1%, Māori by 2.3%, Samoan by 0.2%, and other languages by 4.6%. No language could be spoken by 1.5% (e.g. too young to talk). New Zealand Sign Language was known by 0.6%. The percentage of people born overseas was 10.7, compared with 28.8% nationally.

Religious affiliations were 27.7% Christian, 0.2% Māori religious beliefs, 0.2% Buddhist, 0.2% New Age, and 0.4% other religions. People who answered that they had no religion were 62.7%, and 8.2% of people did not answer the census question.

Of those at least 15 years old, 222 (18.7%) people had a bachelor's or higher degree, 717 (60.5%) had a post-high school certificate or diploma, and 243 (20.5%) people exclusively held high school qualifications. The median income was $39,000, compared with $41,500 nationally. 102 people (8.6%) earned over $100,000 compared to 12.1% nationally. The employment status of those at least 15 was 606 (51.1%) full-time, 201 (17.0%) part-time, and 30 (2.5%) unemployed.

== Education ==
Whareama School is a co-educational state primary school for Year 1 to 8 students, with a roll of 50 as of July 2026. It opened in 1897.
