= Gladstone, New Zealand =

Rural locality in Wellington Region, New Zealand

Gladstone
- Locality
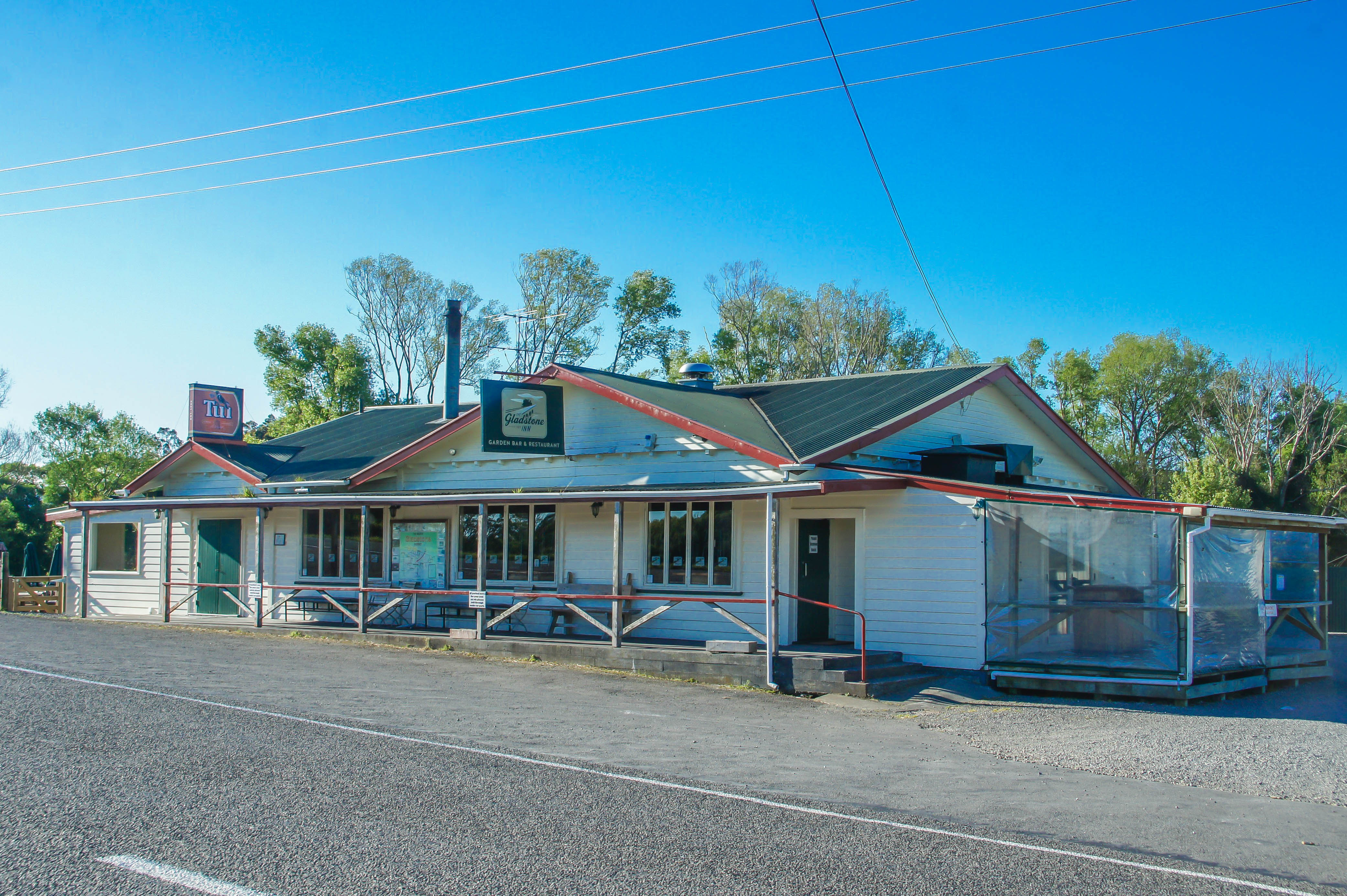
- Gladstone Inn
- Interactive map of Gladstone
- Coordinates: 41°04′40″S 175°39′22″E
- Region: Wellington Region
- Territorial authority: Carterton District
- Electorates: Wairarapa; Ikaroa-Rāwhiti (Māori)

Government
  - Territorial Authority: Carterton District Council
  - Regional council: Greater Wellington Regional Council
  - Mayor of Carterton: Steve Cretney
  - Wairarapa MP: TBD
  - Ikaroa-Rāwhiti MP: Cushla Tangaere-Manuel

Area
  - Total: 91.64 km^{2} (35.38 sq mi)

Population (2023 census)
  - Total: 345
  - Density: 3.76/km^{2} (9.75/sq mi)

Gladstone is a lightly populated locality in the Carterton District of New Zealand's North Island, located on the Mangahuia Stream near where the Tauweru River joins the Ruamāhanga River. The nearest town is Carterton 15 kilometres to the northwest, and nearby settlements include Ponatahi to the west and Longbush to the south. It was named after British prime minister William Ewart Gladstone.

Several other localities in the country are also called Gladstone - an Invercargill suburb, a coastal sawmill village south of Greymouth, a hamlet beside Lake Hāwea and an area near Levin.

== History and culture ==
Thirty-four deceased soldiers from Gladstone and its surrounds are commemorated by a small roadside war memorial, and part of the main road between Masterton and Gladstone is lined with 36 memorial oaks. Why there are thirty-six rather than thirty-four oaks is unknown.

=== Marae ===
The local Hurunui o Rangi Marae is affiliated with the Ngāti Kahungunu hapū of Ngāi Tahu, Ngāi Taneroroa, Ngāti Hinewaka, Ngāti Kaparuparu, Ngāti Moe, Ngāti Parera, Ngāti Rangitataia, Ngāti Rangitehewa, Ngāti Tatuki and Ngāti Te Tomo o Kahungunu, and the Rangitāne hapū of Ngāi Tahu.

In October 2020, the New Zealand Government committed $2,179,654 from the Provincial Growth Fund to upgrade Ngāi Tumapuhia a Rangi ki Okautete, Motuwairaka, Pāpāwai, Kohunui, Hurunui o Rangi and Te Oreore marae. The projects were expected to create 19.8 full time jobs.

== Demographics ==
Gladstone locality covers 91.64 km^{2} (35.38 sq mi). It is part of the larger Gladstone statistical area.

Historical population for Gladstone locality
Year	Pop.	±% p.a.
2006	237	—
2013	294	+3.13%
2018	309	+1.00%
2023	345	+2.23%

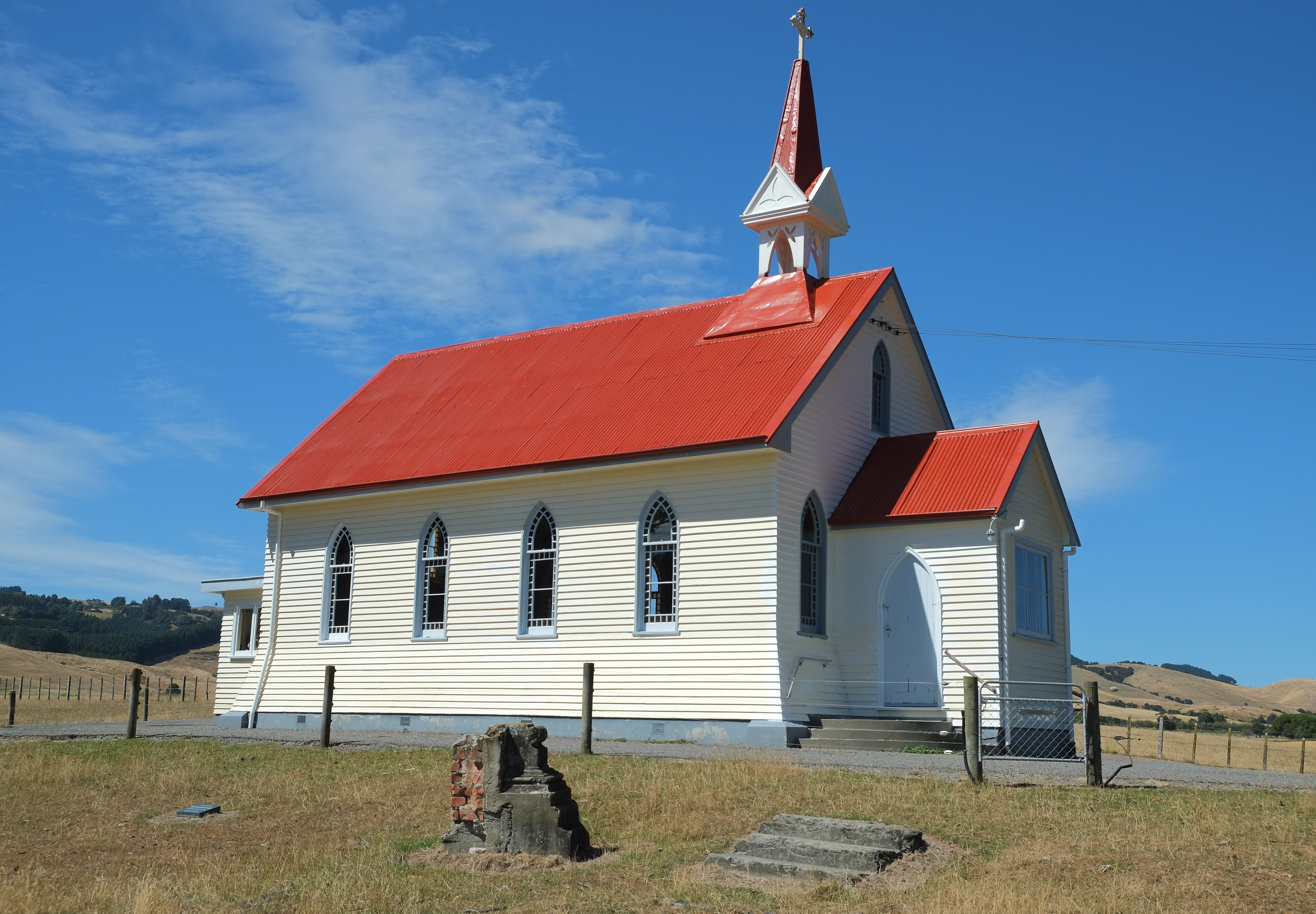
Gladstone Church, rebuilt in 1955

The locality had a population of 345 in the 2023 New Zealand census, an increase of 36 people (11.7%) since the 2018 census, and an increase of 51 people (17.3%) since the 2013 census. There were 174 males and 171 females in 141 dwellings. 1.7% of people identified as LGBTIQ+. There were 75 people (21.7%) aged under 15 years, 24 (7.0%) aged 15 to 29, 183 (53.0%) aged 30 to 64, and 60 (17.4%) aged 65 or older.

People could identify as more than one ethnicity. The results were 88.7% European (Pākehā); 12.2% Māori; 0.9% Pasifika; 0.9% Asian; 1.7% Middle Eastern, Latin American and African New Zealanders (MELAA); and 7.0% other, which includes people giving their ethnicity as "New Zealander". English was spoken by 96.5%, Māori by 2.6%, Samoan by 0.9%, and other languages by 8.7%. No language could be spoken by 1.7% (e.g. too young to talk). The percentage of people born overseas was 16.5, compared with 28.8% nationally.

Religious affiliations were 30.4% Christian, and 0.9% New Age. People who answered that they had no religion were 55.7%, and 12.2% of people did not answer the census question.

Of those at least 15 years old, 90 (33.3%) people had a bachelor's or higher degree, 144 (53.3%) had a post-high school certificate or diploma, and 39 (14.4%) people exclusively held high school qualifications. 42 people (15.6%) earned over $100,000 compared to 12.1% nationally. The employment status of those at least 15 was 150 (55.6%) full-time, 54 (20.0%) part-time, and 3 (1.1%) unemployed.

=== Gladstone statistical area ===
Gladstone statistical area covers 621.16 km^{2} (239.83 sq mi) and also includes Longbush. It had an estimated population of 980 as of June 2025, with a population density of 1.6 people per km^{2}.

Historical population for the statistical area
Year	Pop.	±% p.a.
2006	711	—
2013	816	+1.99%
2018	870	+1.29%
2023	939	+1.54%

Gladstone had a population of 939 in the 2023 New Zealand census, an increase of 69 people (7.9%) since the 2018 census, and an increase of 123 people (15.1%) since the 2013 census. There were 477 males and 459 females in 360 dwellings. 2.6% of people identified as LGBTIQ+. The median age was 44.4 years (compared with 38.1 years nationally). There were 198 people (21.1%) aged under 15 years, 120 (12.8%) aged 15 to 29, 471 (50.2%) aged 30 to 64, and 147 (15.7%) aged 65 or older.

People could identify as more than one ethnicity. The results were 92.0% European (Pākehā); 13.1% Māori; 1.0% Pasifika; 0.6% Asian; 0.3% Middle Eastern, Latin American and African New Zealanders (MELAA); and 5.8% other, which includes people giving their ethnicity as "New Zealander". English was spoken by 98.1%, Māori by 2.2%, Samoan by 0.3%, and other languages by 5.4%. No language could be spoken by 1.6% (e.g. too young to talk). New Zealand Sign Language was known by 0.3%. The percentage of people born overseas was 13.7, compared with 28.8% nationally.

Religious affiliations were 28.8% Christian, 0.6% New Age, and 1.0% other religions. People who answered that they had no religion were 60.7%, and 8.9% of people did not answer the census question.

Of those at least 15 years old, 222 (30.0%) people had a bachelor's or higher degree, 405 (54.7%) had a post-high school certificate or diploma, and 105 (14.2%) people exclusively held high school qualifications. The median income was $48,300, compared with $41,500 nationally. 105 people (14.2%) earned over $100,000 compared to 12.1% nationally. The employment status of those at least 15 was 435 (58.7%) full-time, 144 (19.4%) part-time, and 15 (2.0%) unemployed.

== Economy ==
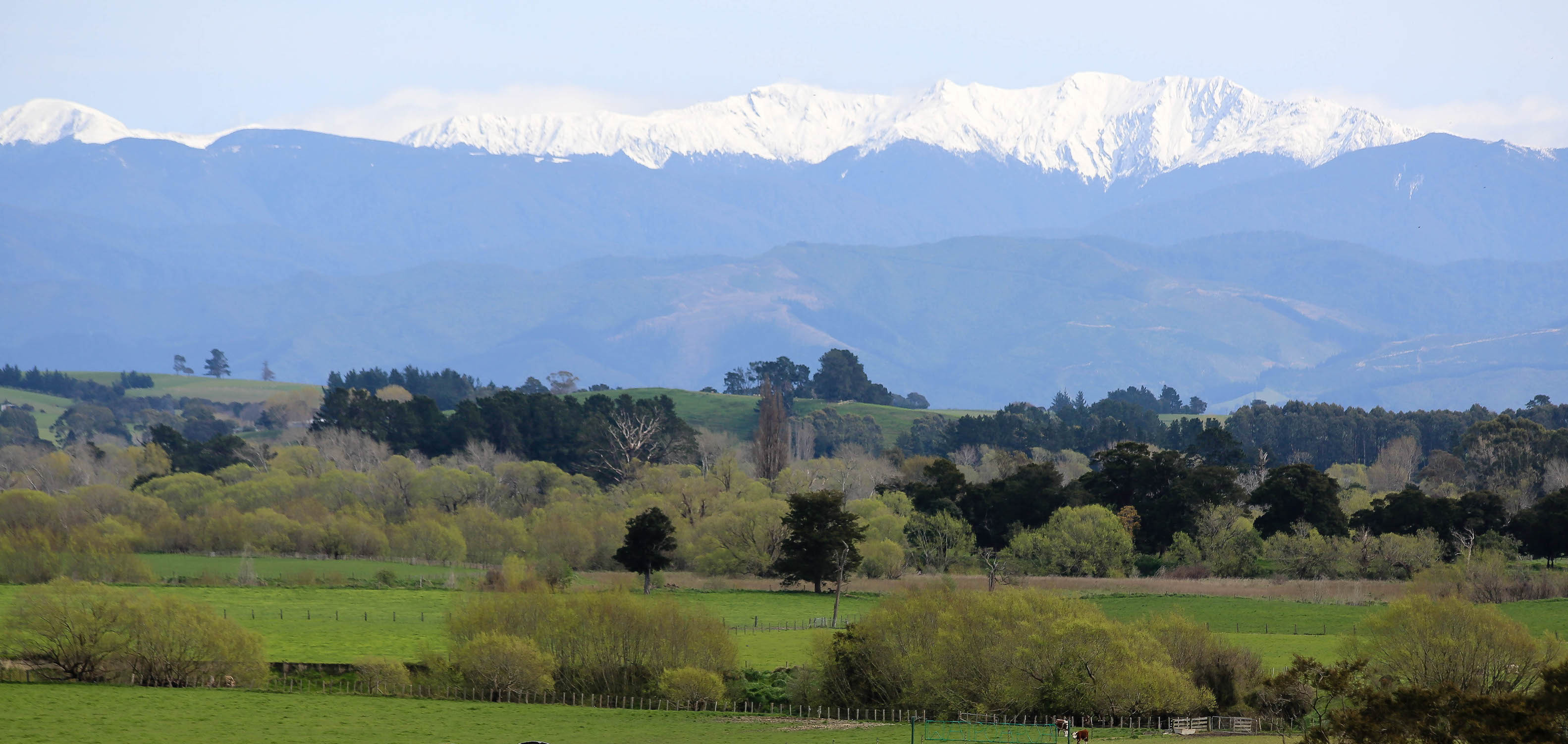
Looking north-west from Gladstone, Spring 2014

Gladstone is primarily a farming community and some viticulture occurs in the area. Viticultural activity is increasing as winemakers realise the potential of soil and climate that produce low yielding rich concentrated grapes. Gladstone also has a number of small businesses and industries, including cafes, homestays, and a wheelwright shop. The Summit Lodge is Gladstone's five star rated guest lodge which has been hosting guests since it was built in 2009.

The Gladstone Inn, known to locals as "The Gladdy", is Gladstone's local pub. It was voted the best country hotel in New Zealand in 2006 survey by the New Zealand Hospitality Association.

Gladstone also has a sports complex, built in 1979 - which is owned and run by the local community. Admiral Rd is often used by international cycling competitions and it was first "Everested" in 2017

== Education ==
Gladstone School is a full primary school with a roll of 184 students as of July 2026. It opened in 1876. This has been the main school for the area since the closure of schools in Longbush (opened 1904, closed in the 1950s), Maungaraki (opened 1948, closed 1967), Te Whiti (opened 1885, closed 1968 or 1972) and Wharau / Te Wharau (opened 1898, closed 1899, opened again 1902, and closed in 1989)

== Sport ==
A sports complex is located in Gladstone near the pub. It is the home of Gladstone's rugby union, hockey and netball clubs.

The Wairarapa Pistol and Shooting Sports Club (formerly the Wairarapa Pistol Club) has a shooting range in the area.

== Climate ==
Climate data for Gladstone (1971–2000)
Month	Jan	Feb	Mar	Apr	May	Jun	Jul	Aug	Sep	Oct	Nov	Dec	Year
Mean daily maximum °C (°F)	22.9 (73.2)	23.2 (73.8)	21.2 (70.2)	18.2 (64.8)	15.0 (59.0)	12.5 (54.5)	11.9 (53.4)	12.7 (54.9)	14.8 (58.6)	16.8 (62.2)	18.7 (65.7)	21.1 (70.0)	17.4 (63.4)
Daily mean °C (°F)	17.1 (62.8)	17.2 (63.0)	15.5 (59.9)	12.9 (55.2)	10.2 (50.4)	8.1 (46.6)	7.6 (45.7)	8.3 (46.9)	10.2 (50.4)	11.8 (53.2)	13.4 (56.1)	15.5 (59.9)	12.3 (54.2)
Mean daily minimum °C (°F)	11.4 (52.5)	11.2 (52.2)	9.8 (49.6)	7.7 (45.9)	5.4 (41.7)	3.6 (38.5)	3.2 (37.8)	3.8 (38.8)	5.5 (41.9)	6.8 (44.2)	8.2 (46.8)	10.0 (50.0)	7.2 (45.0)
Average rainfall mm (inches)	52 (2.0)	48 (1.9)	69 (2.7)	75 (3.0)	94 (3.7)	103 (4.1)	123 (4.8)	104 (4.1)	74 (2.9)	69 (2.7)	54 (2.1)	71 (2.8)	936 (36.8)
Source: NIWA (rainfall 1951–1980)
