= Castlepoint =

Beachside settlement in New Zealand

Castlepoint Rangiwhakaoma
- Town
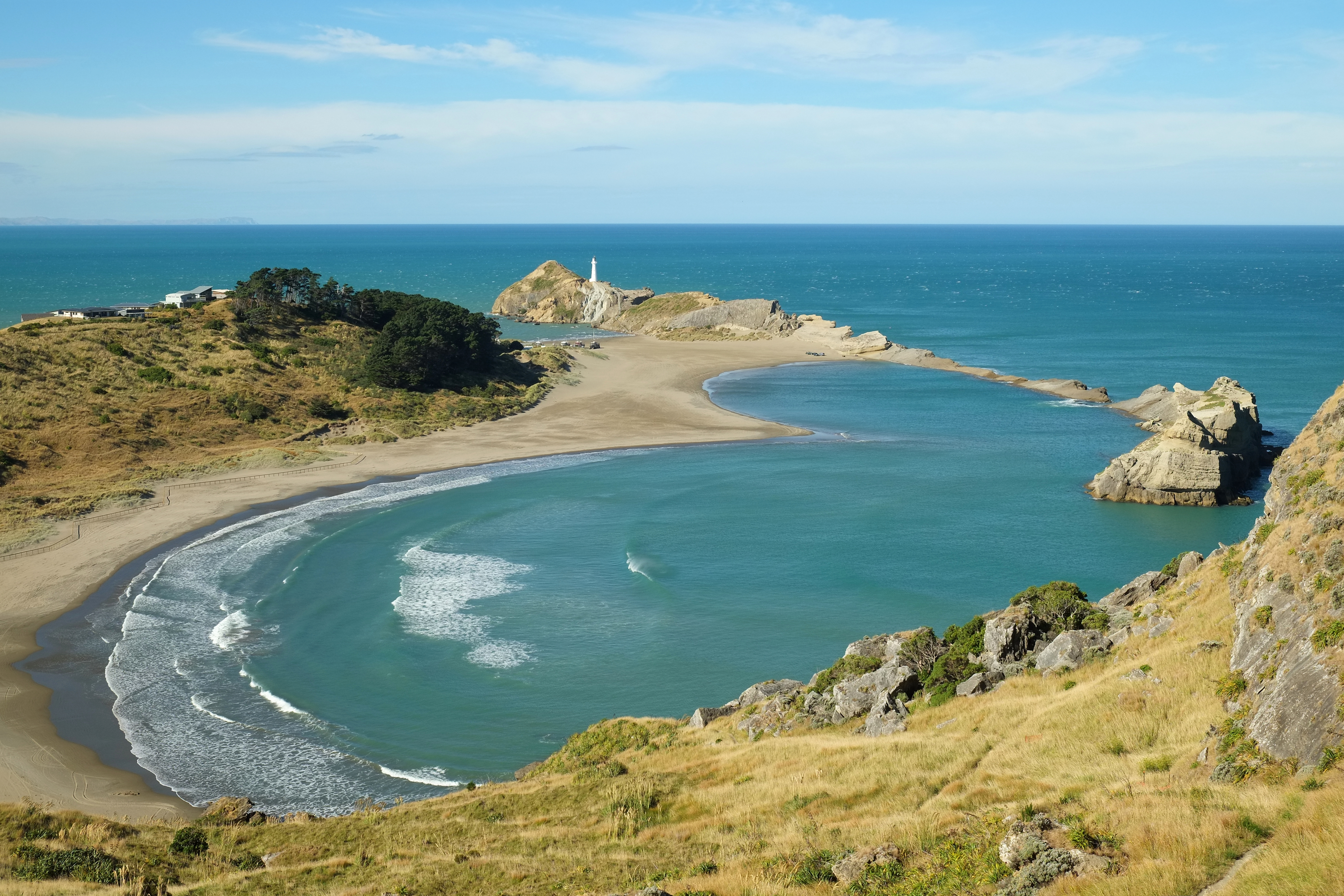
- Deliverance Cove towards Castlepoint and lighthouse
- Interactive map of Castlepoint
- Coordinates: 40°53′55″S 176°13′14″E
- Country: New Zealand
- Region: Wellington Region
- Territorial authority: Masterton District
- Ward: Masterton/Whakaoriori General Ward; Masterton/Whakaoriori Māori Ward
- Electorates: Wairarapa; Ikaroa-Rāwhiti (Māori)

Government
  - Territorial Authority: Masterton District Council
  - Regional council: Greater Wellington Regional Council
  - Mayor of Masterton: Bex Johnson
  - Wairarapa MP: TBD
  - Ikaroa-Rāwhiti MP: Cushla Tangaere-Manuel

Area
  - Total: 0.81 km^{2} (0.31 sq mi)

Population (June 2025)
  - Total: 60
  - Density: 74/km^{2} (190/sq mi)

Castlepoint is a small beachside settlement on the Wairarapa coast of the Wellington Region of New Zealand. It is home to a lighthouse which stands near the top of the northern end of a reef. The reef is about one kilometre long. At the southern end of the reef, there is an island known locally as "seagull island", due to its large population of seagulls. The southern side of Castle Rock is known as Christmas Bay. Castlepoint is approximately one hour's drive from Masterton.

Castlepoint was so named in 1770 by Captain Cook who was struck by the similarities of Castle Rock to the battlements of a castle. The Maori name for the area is Rangiwhakaoma, which translates as 'where the sky runs'. Smaller cetaceans such as dolphins frequent around Castlepoint while larger whales such as southern right whales and humpback whales may be visible from the shores during their migration seasons. A book chronicling the history of Castlepoint, including Castlepoint Station, Castle Point Lighthouse and the local fishing industry was published in October 2010 by Hedleys Books of Masterton.

Castle Rock is a landmark in Castlepoint and is 162 m high. It includes a walk through woods and over bridges and is approximately 45 minutes long.

Mataikona Sand Dunes are an area of large sand dunes approximately 30 minutes north of Castlepoint towards the Mataikona River mouth.

== Demographics ==
Castlepoint is described by Statistics New Zealand as a rural settlement and covers 0.81 km^{2} (0.31 sq mi). It had an estimated population of 60 as of June 2025, with a population density of 74 people per km^{2}. Castlepoint is part of the larger Whareama statistical area.

Historical population
Year	Pop.	±% p.a.
2006	27	—
2013	42	+6.52%
2018	57	+6.30%
2023	60	+1.03%

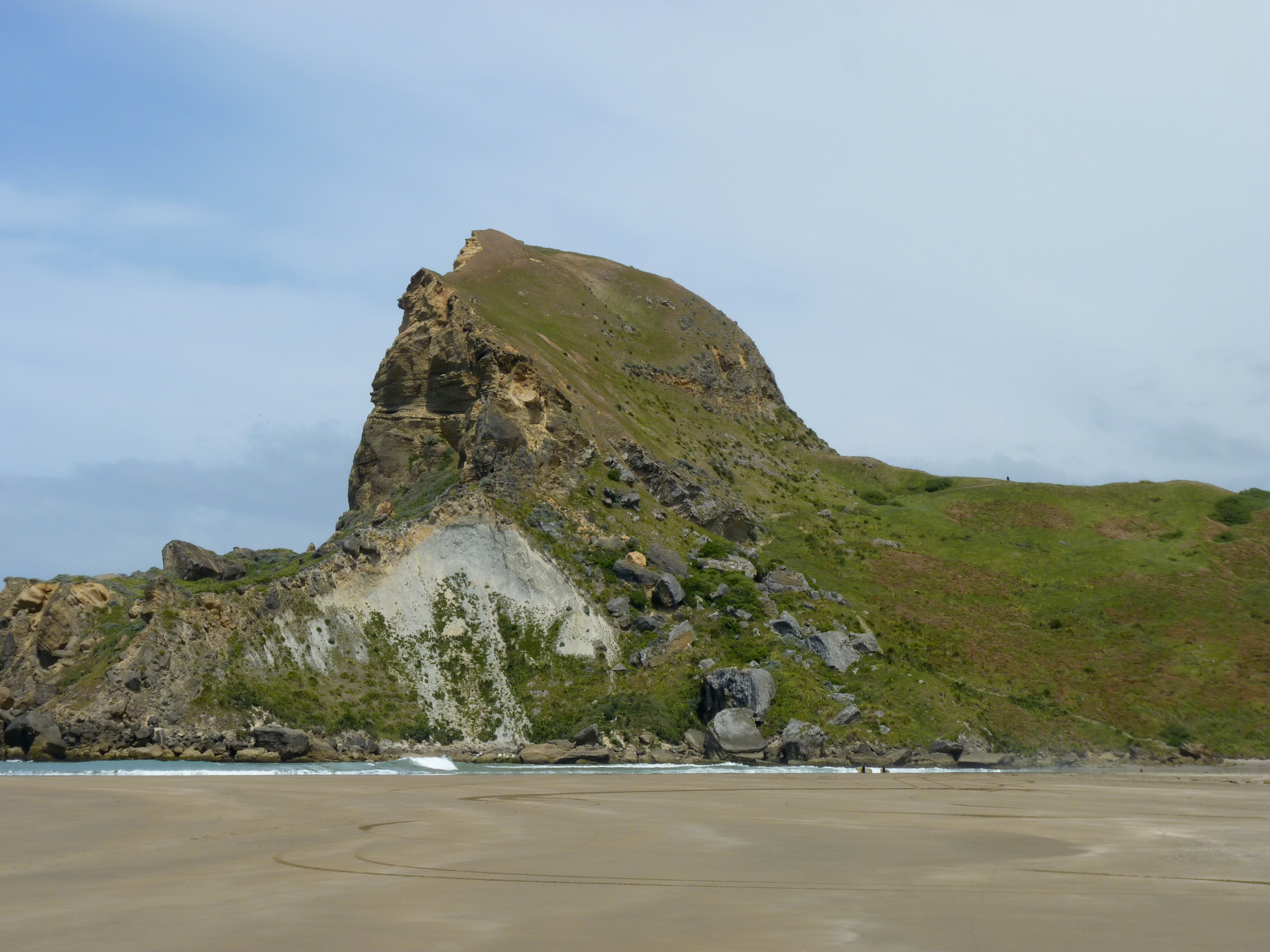
Two surfers and their surfboards in Deliverance Cove in front of Castle Rock

Castlepoint had a population of 60 in the 2023 New Zealand census, an increase of 3 people (5.3%) since the 2018 census, and an increase of 18 people (42.9%) since the 2013 census. There were 30 males and 27 females in 27 dwellings. The median age was 54.5 years (compared with 38.1 years nationally). There were 6 people (10.0%) aged under 15 years, 9 (15.0%) aged 15 to 29, 24 (40.0%) aged 30 to 64, and 21 (35.0%) aged 65 or older.

People could identify as more than one ethnicity. The results were 95.0% European (Pākehā), 15.0% Māori, 5.0% Pasifika, and 5.0% Asian. English was spoken by 100.0%, and Māori by 5.0%. The percentage of people born overseas was 15.0, compared with 28.8% nationally.

The sole religious affiliation given was 30.0% Christian. People who answered that they had no religion were 60.0%, and 5.0% of people did not answer the census question.

Of those at least 15 years old, 6 (11.1%) people had a bachelor's or higher degree, 27 (50.0%) had a post-high school certificate or diploma, and 21 (38.9%) people exclusively held high school qualifications. The median income was $29,200, compared with $41,500 nationally. 6 people (11.1%) earned over $100,000 compared to 12.1% nationally. The employment status of those at least 15 was 21 (38.9%) full-time and 12 (22.2%) part-time.

== Marae ==
The local Whakataki marae is affiliated with the Ngāti Kahungunu hapū of Te Hika a Pāpāuma ki Wairarapa. Its wharenui burned down 1960.

== Annual horse races ==
Remote from other settlements Castlepoint's beach has been home since 1872 to an historic annual horse race meeting when "local station hands rode on farm hacks competing for bottles of rum and any stray coins".

== Lighthouse ==
The Castle Point Lighthouse is a lighthouse near the village of Castlepoint in the Wellington Region of the North Island of New Zealand. It is owned and operated by Maritime New Zealand. In the early days of the 20th century Castle Point was one of the few lighthouses with easy access to a school. The Creamer family came there in 1918 or 1919 and the eldest son Eric had to complete five years of education in three years, so that he could go on to secondary school, there having been little education in previous locations where the family had been stationed. This aspect of the Keeper's lives seems to have been overlooked by the Marine Department. The light was built in 1913 and was originally fuelled by oil. In 1954 the oil lamp was replaced with an electric one powered by a local diesel generator. This was subsequently replaced by a connection to the mains grid in 1961. The lighthouse, is popular with holiday makers and the lighthouse itself is sometimes referred to as "The Holiday Light".

Completed on 12 January 1913, it was one of the last staffed lights built in New Zealand, but has been fully automated since 1988 and is now managed from a central control room in Wellington. It is a popular tourist attraction for holidaymakers to the area, although it is not open to the public.

The lighthouse is built out of steel sheets riveted together. This is an unusual method of construction for a lighthouse and the only one so built in New Zealand.

At sea, the light can be seen 35 kilometres (22 mi) away, and was used by sailors coming from South America to establish a point of reference when making for Wellington Harbour.

A camera set up at the top of an outcrop looking down on the lighthouse gives people a chance to see it on live feed castlepointlighthouse.com.

In December 2017, the lighthouse was controversially installed with multi-colour LED up-lights which would light the exterior of the lighthouse all year round at a cost of $35,000. Many Wairarapa region residents feel the lights are 'gaudy' and a source of unnecessary light pollution.

== Climate ==
Climate data for Castlepoint (1991–2020 normals, extremes 1972–present)
Month	Jan	Feb	Mar	Apr	May	Jun	Jul	Aug	Sep	Oct	Nov	Dec	Year
Record high °C (°F)	32.2 (90.0)	31.5 (88.7)	29.5 (85.1)	27.3 (81.1)	23.7 (74.7)	22.0 (71.6)	20.0 (68.0)	21.4 (70.5)	23.2 (73.8)	25.0 (77.0)	28.0 (82.4)	29.7 (85.5)	32.2 (90.0)
Mean maximum °C (°F)	28.3 (82.9)	27.9 (82.2)	26.3 (79.3)	23.9 (75.0)	20.7 (69.3)	18.4 (65.1)	16.7 (62.1)	18.2 (64.8)	20.4 (68.7)	22.2 (72.0)	24.3 (75.7)	26.4 (79.5)	29.3 (84.7)
Mean daily maximum °C (°F)	22.0 (71.6)	21.9 (71.4)	20.5 (68.9)	18.4 (65.1)	16.2 (61.2)	14.0 (57.2)	13.2 (55.8)	13.8 (56.8)	15.5 (59.9)	17.1 (62.8)	18.6 (65.5)	20.5 (68.9)	17.6 (63.8)
Daily mean °C (°F)	18.1 (64.6)	18.2 (64.8)	16.9 (62.4)	14.8 (58.6)	13.0 (55.4)	10.9 (51.6)	10.2 (50.4)	10.6 (51.1)	12.0 (53.6)	13.4 (56.1)	14.8 (58.6)	16.8 (62.2)	14.1 (57.5)
Mean daily minimum °C (°F)	14.2 (57.6)	14.5 (58.1)	13.3 (55.9)	11.3 (52.3)	9.7 (49.5)	7.9 (46.2)	7.3 (45.1)	7.5 (45.5)	8.6 (47.5)	9.8 (49.6)	11.0 (51.8)	13.1 (55.6)	10.7 (51.2)
Mean minimum °C (°F)	7.9 (46.2)	8.9 (48.0)	7.7 (45.9)	5.6 (42.1)	4.3 (39.7)	2.6 (36.7)	2.1 (35.8)	2.3 (36.1)	2.8 (37.0)	3.8 (38.8)	5.1 (41.2)	7.1 (44.8)	1.0 (33.8)
Record low °C (°F)	5.0 (41.0)	6.2 (43.2)	5.6 (42.1)	2.5 (36.5)	1.0 (33.8)	0.6 (33.1)	−0.3 (31.5)	0.0 (32.0)	0.5 (32.9)	0.5 (32.9)	0.8 (33.4)	4.7 (40.5)	−0.3 (31.5)
Average rainfall mm (inches)	80.1 (3.15)	59.8 (2.35)	74.3 (2.93)	84.4 (3.32)	90.1 (3.55)	104.1 (4.10)	123.9 (4.88)	91.8 (3.61)	64.2 (2.53)	80.4 (3.17)	67.4 (2.65)	60.4 (2.38)	980.9 (38.62)
Source: NIWA

== Gallery ==
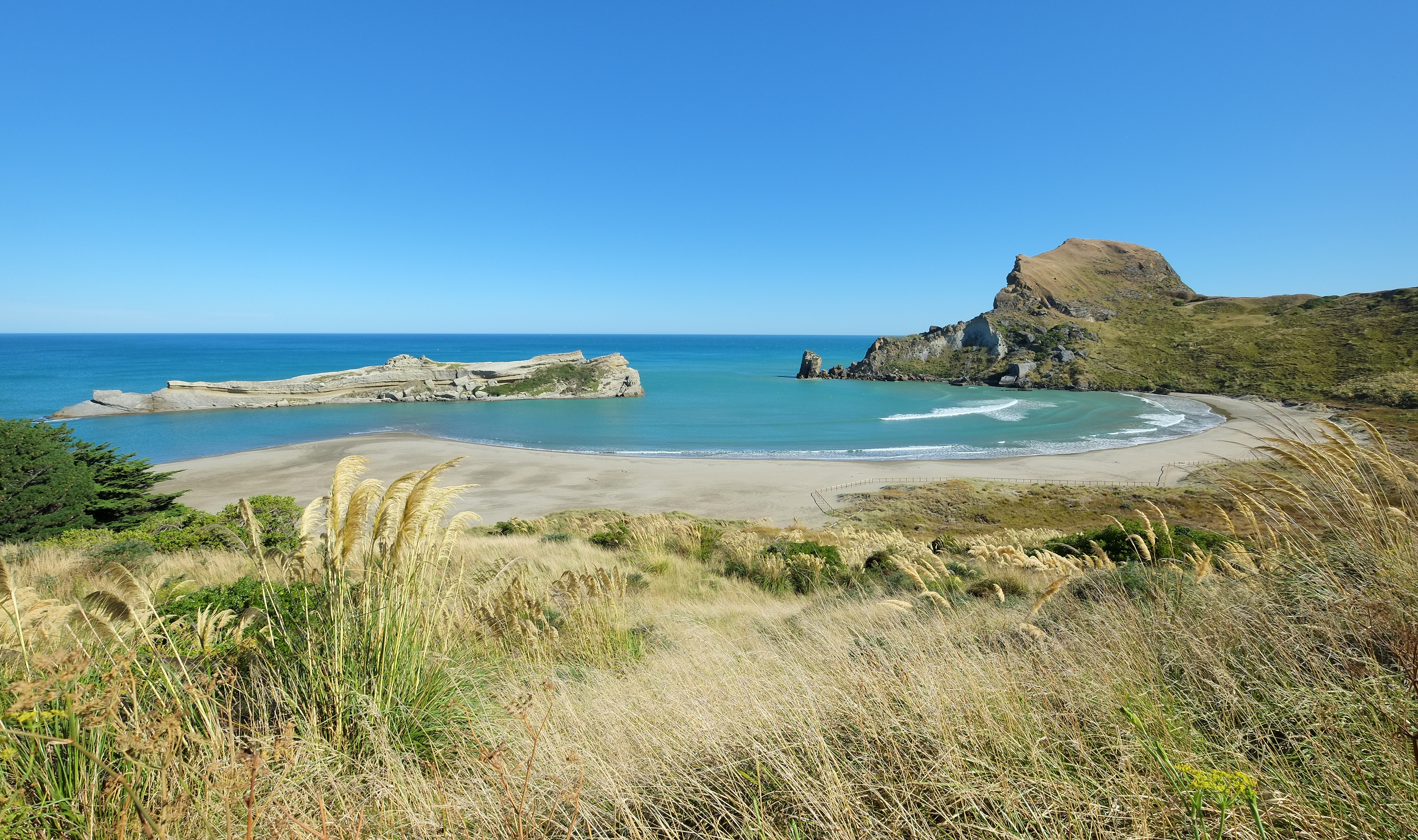
Deliverance Cove and Castle Rock

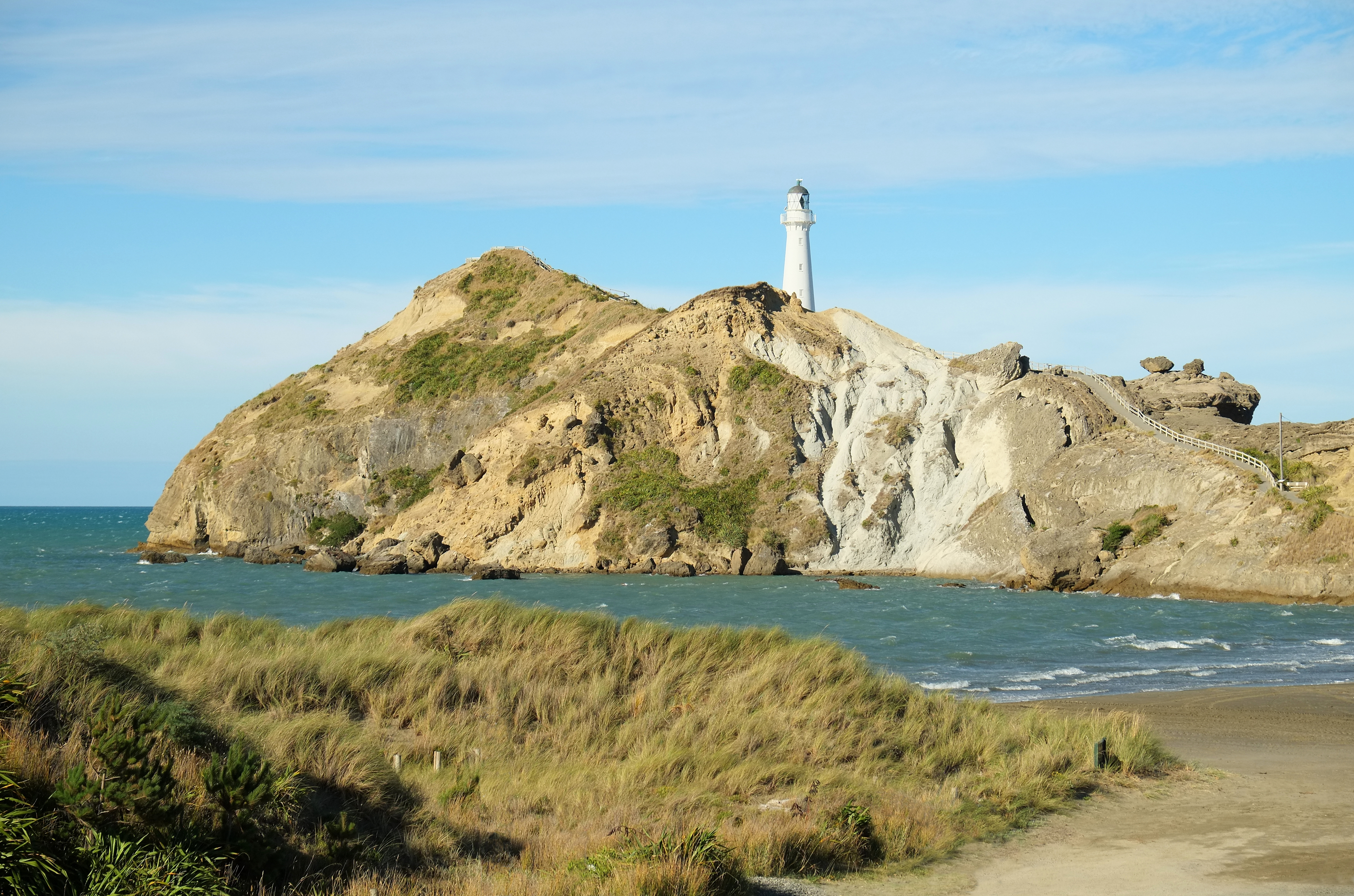
Castlepoint Lighthouse from the beach at Castlepoint

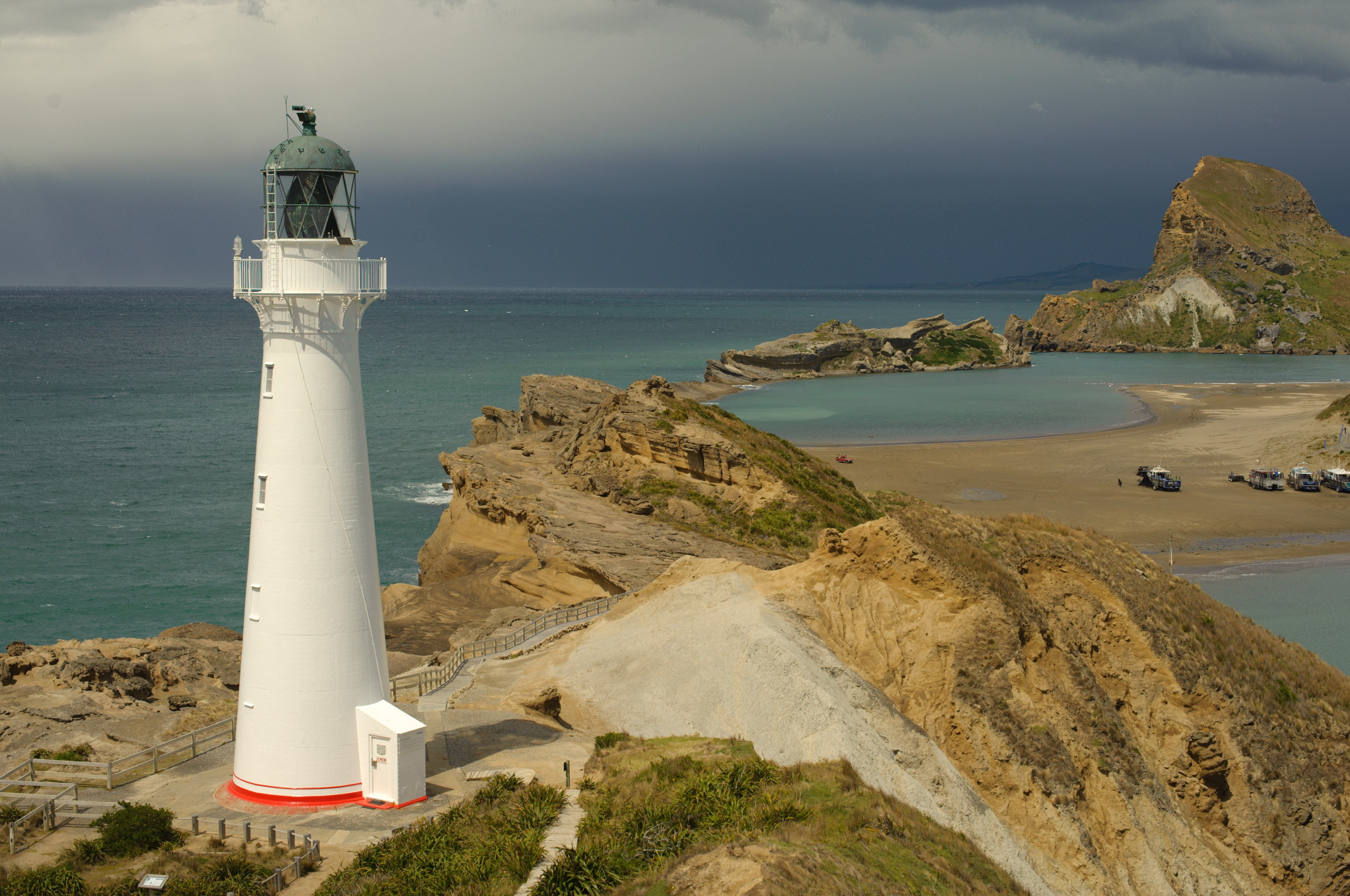
Castlepoint Lighthouse looking towards Castle Rock

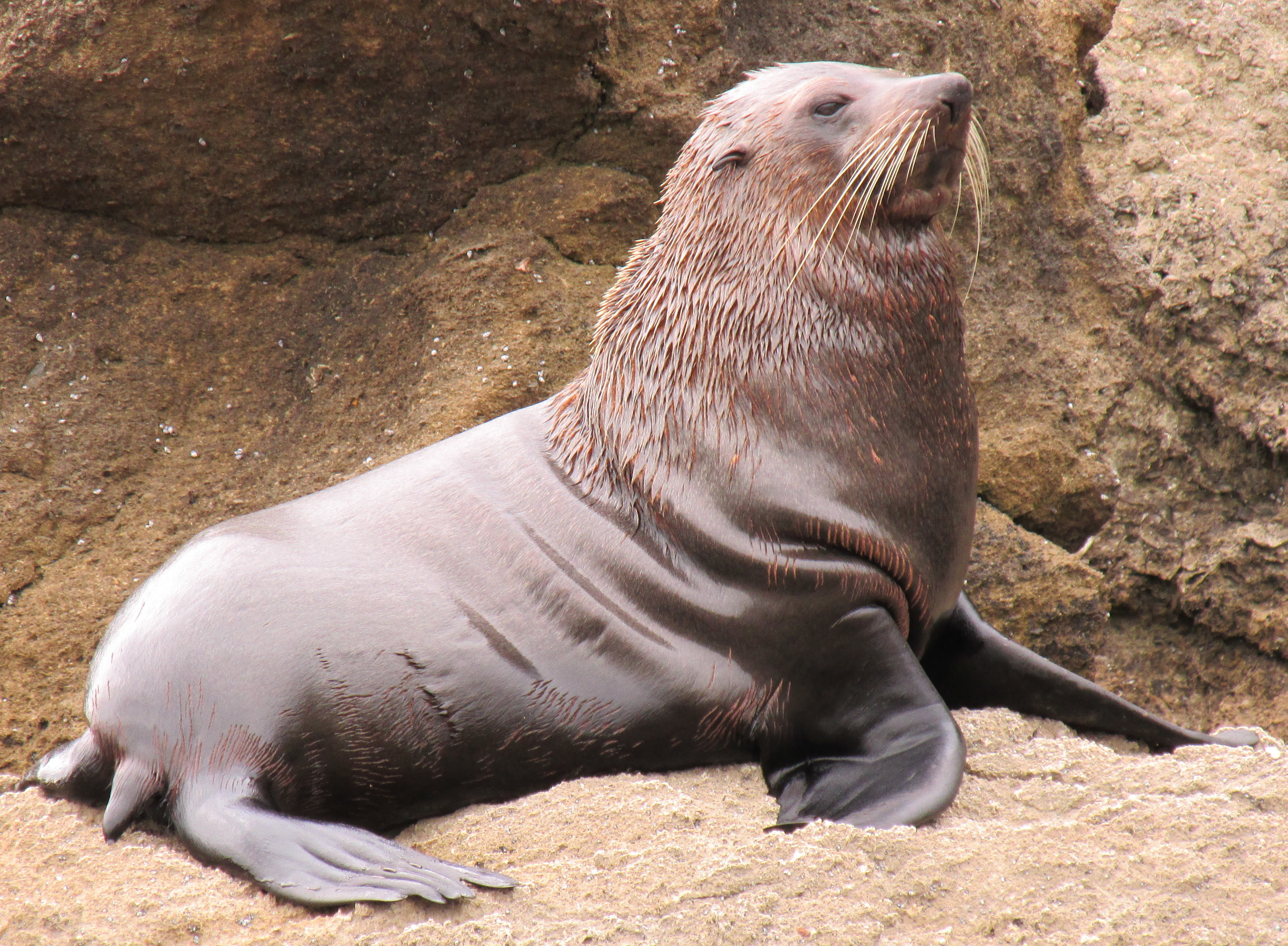
New Zealand fur seal on a rock at Castle point
