= Lake Wairarapa =

Lake in the North Island of New Zealand

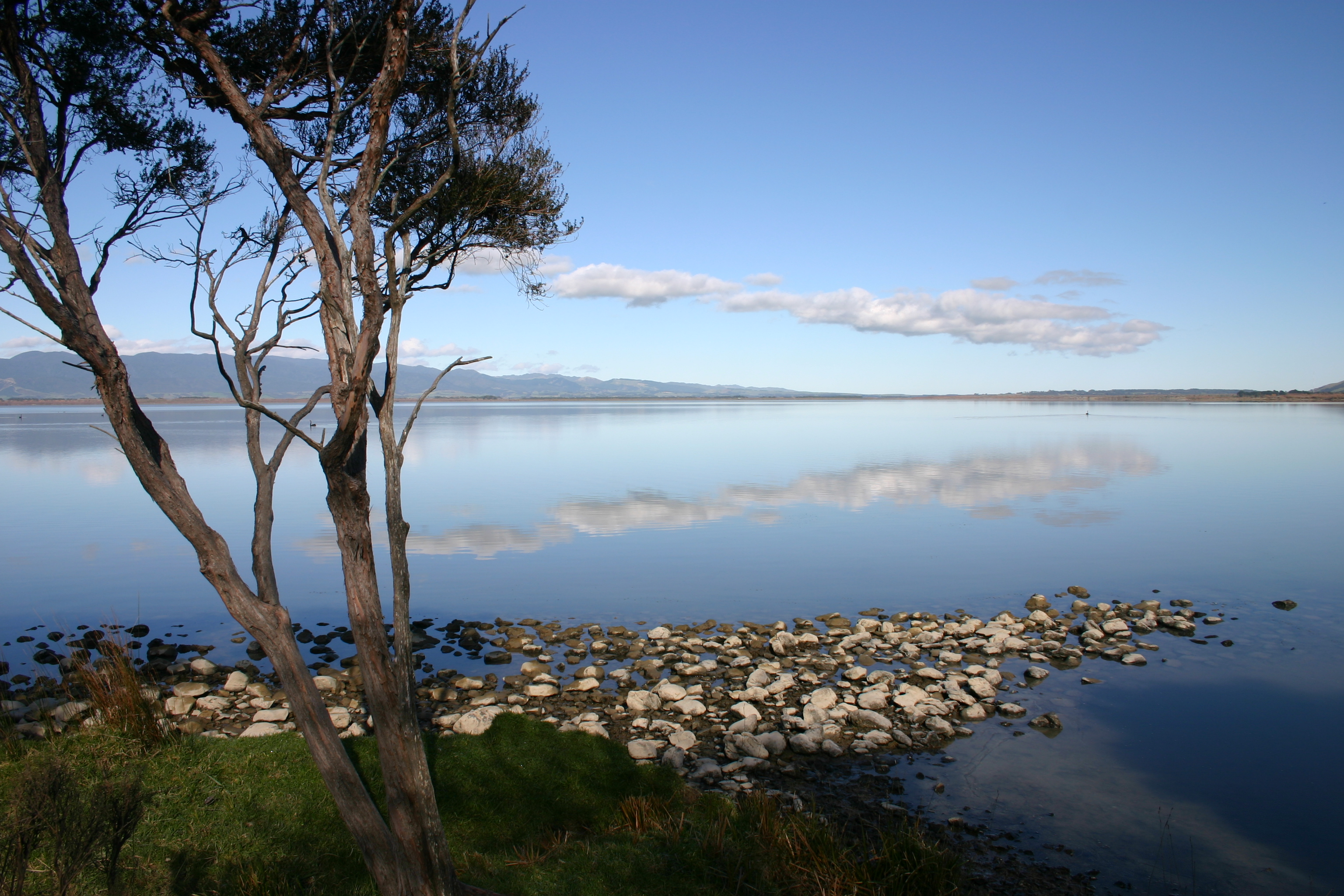
- Western shore looking south

- Lake Wairarapa is in the Wellington Region of the North Island.
- Interactive map of Lake Wairarapa
- Location: South Wairarapa District, Wellington Region, North Island
- Coordinates: 41°13′S 175°15′E
- Primary inflows: Tauwharenīkau River, Waiorongomai River, Oporua Spillway
- Primary outflows: Ruamāhanga River
- Basin countries: New Zealand
- Surface area: 78 km^{2} (30 sq mi)
- Max. depth: 2.5 m (8 ft 2 in)
- Settlements: Featherston

Ramsar Wetland
- Official name: Wairarapa Moana Wetland
- Designated: 20 August 2020
- Reference no.: 2432

Lake Wairarapa is a lake at the southern end of the North Island of New Zealand, 50 kilometres (31 mi) east of Wellington. The lake covers an area of 78 km^{2} (30 sq mi), and its maximum depth is 2.5 m (8.2 ft). It is the third largest lake in the North Island, fractionally smaller than Lake Rotorua (covering 79.8 km^{2}). The nearest town to the lake is Featherston, which is located five kilometres from its northern shore.

The lake forms part of the Wairarapa Moana Wetlands, a regional park administered by Wellington Regional Council, in collaboration with Kahungunu ki Wairarapa, the Department of Conservation, South Wairarapa District Council, and Rangitāne o Wairarapa. The wetland is the largest in the lower North Island, one of the largest in New Zealand, and was recognised as a wetland of international significance under the Ramsar Convention in August 2020.

== Geography ==
The lake's catchment area is large, and includes the eastern slopes of the Remutaka and Tararua Ranges. The lake receives inflows from several rivers and was originally the main point of outflow for the Ruamāhanga. Lake Wairarapa drained slowly into Palliser Bay and Cook Strait ten kilometres south near the settlement of Lake Ferry, via what is now Lake Ōnoke, but was prone to flooding. The Ruamāhanga River was diverted away from Lake Wairarapa in the 1960s to assist its flow, reducing the risk of flooding for farmers. The lake today therefore covers an area significantly smaller than its historical size of around 210 km^{2} (81 sq mi).

The area around the lake is low-lying and swampy. Agriculture and river development, flood control, and waterway diversions have resulted in the drainage of large areas of the surrounding wetlands, reducing their ecological values. Recent efforts have been made to preserve its important wetland features and restore wildlife habitat that has been degraded through human use.

Lake Wairarapa is classed as supertrophic on the trophic level index, meaning that it is polluted with a combination of nitrates which leach from intensified agriculture in the catchment area of the lake, and the outflows from sewage treatment plants for Masterton, Carterton, Greytown and Martinborough.

== History ==
The name Wairarapa means "glistening waters" in te reo Māori. According to some oral histories, the Polynesian explorer Kupe named the wetlands after touching down in the area several times. According to other oral histories, explorer Haunui named the wetlands after the way the lake appeared to glisten from the Remutaka Ranges to the west.

The lake has long been used by Māori as a source of readily available food, and many species of waterfowl and fish uncommon elsewhere in New Zealand can be found in or around the lake.

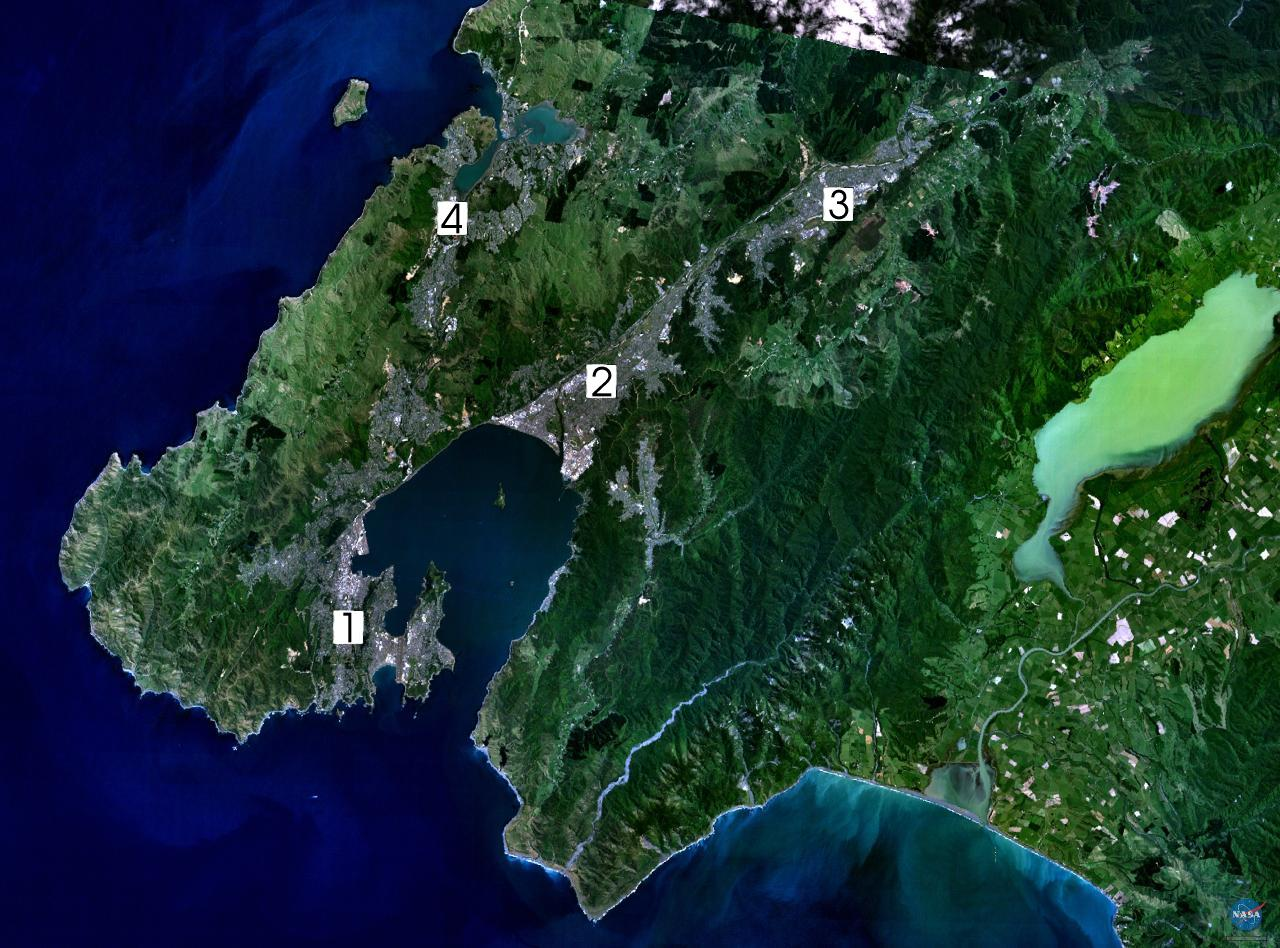
Lake Wairarapa is the large light area at the right of this satellite image of the Wellington area (composite landsat-7 image).

== Climate ==
Climate data for Lake Wairarapa (Waiorongomai) (1981–2010)
Month	Jan	Feb	Mar	Apr	May	Jun	Jul	Aug	Sep	Oct	Nov	Dec	Year
Mean daily maximum °C (°F)	21.7 (71.1)	21.8 (71.2)	20.3 (68.5)	17.4 (63.3)	15.1 (59.2)	12.8 (55.0)	12.0 (53.6)	12.8 (55.0)	14.5 (58.1)	15.9 (60.6)	17.6 (63.7)	19.6 (67.3)	16.8 (62.2)
Daily mean °C (°F)	17.3 (63.1)	17.2 (63.0)	15.8 (60.4)	13.1 (55.6)	11.3 (52.3)	9.3 (48.7)	8.5 (47.3)	9.0 (48.2)	10.6 (51.1)	12.2 (54.0)	13.7 (56.7)	15.8 (60.4)	12.8 (55.1)
Mean daily minimum °C (°F)	13.0 (55.4)	12.5 (54.5)	11.3 (52.3)	8.8 (47.8)	7.4 (45.3)	5.7 (42.3)	5.0 (41.0)	5.1 (41.2)	6.8 (44.2)	8.4 (47.1)	9.8 (49.6)	12.1 (53.8)	8.8 (47.9)
Average rainfall mm (inches)	83.8 (3.30)	88.1 (3.47)	122.4 (4.82)	108.4 (4.27)	151.8 (5.98)	147.3 (5.80)	139.4 (5.49)	143.6 (5.65)	118.0 (4.65)	126.1 (4.96)	119.1 (4.69)	127.0 (5.00)	1,475 (58.08)
Source: NIWA

== See also ==
- List of lakes in New Zealand
- Lakes of New Zealand
