= Ruamāhanga River =

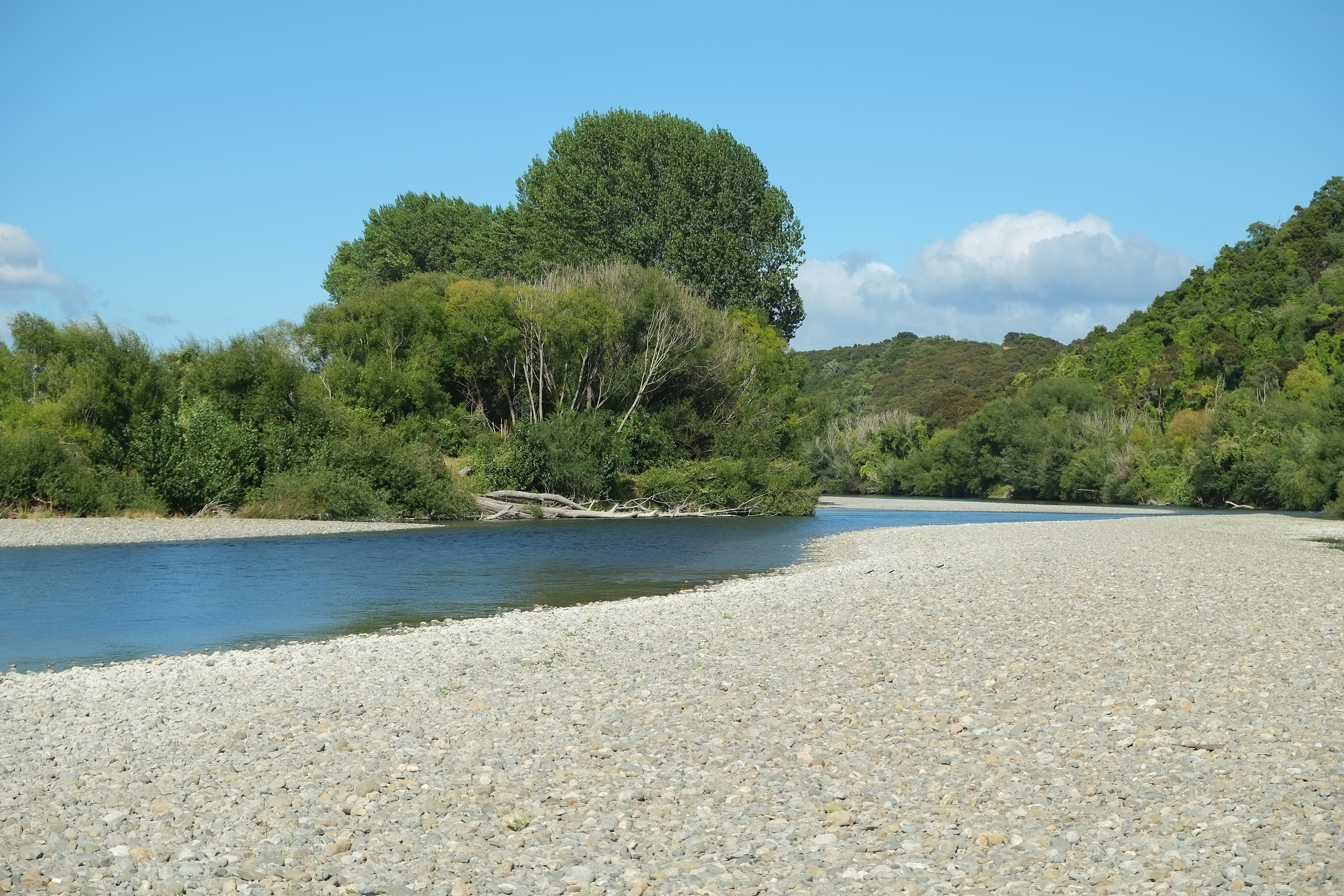
- Ruamāhanga River near Carter Scenic Reserve
- Route of the Ruamāhanga River
- Mouth of the Ruamāhanga River Ruamāhanga River (North Island)
- Native name: Te Awa Tapu o Ruamāhanga (Māori)

Location
- Country: New Zealand
- Island: North Island
- Region: Wellington
- District: Masterton, Carterton, South Wairarapa

Physical characteristics
- Source: Tararua Range
  - location: Between Dundas Ridge and the Twins
  - coordinates: 40.7441°S 175.4436°E
  - elevation: 1,504 m (4,934 ft)
- Mouth: Lake Ōnoke
  - coordinates: 41°22′16″S 175°08′25″E
  - elevation: 0 m (0 ft)
- Length: 158 km (98 mi)
- Basin size: 3,470 km^{2} (1,340 sq mi)
- Discharge
  - average: 81 m^{3}/s (2,900 cu ft/s)

Basin features
- Progression: Ruamāhanga River → Lake Ōnoke → Lake Ōnoke Outlet → Palliser Bay → Cook Strait → Pacific Ocean
- Cities: Masterton, Pāpāwai
- Tributaries
  - left: Chamberlain Creek, Ruapae Stream, Kōpuaranga River, Mangaotawake Stream, Whangaehu River, Tauweru River, Makahakaha Stream, Ahiaruhe Stream, Big Swamp Stream, Pohaturiki Stream, Waitawatautau Stream, Huangarua River, Kellys Stream, Dry River, Ōkōura Stream, Parapara Stream, Pātakanui Stream / Grannys Creek, Waihora Stream, Whangaehu Stream, Tauanui River, Tūranganui River
  - right: Cleft Creek, Waipoua River, Makoura Stream, Waingawa River, Waikoukou Stream, Booths Creek, Waiohine River, Papawai Stream, Whakawiriwiri Stream, Lake Wairarapa Outlet, Boundary Creek
- Bridges: Ruamāhanga River Suspension Bridge, Ruamāhanga River Bridge (State Highway 2), Wairarapa Line railway bridge, Opaki-Kaiparoro Road bridge, Te Ore Ore Road bridge, Te Whiti Road bridge, Gladstone Road bridge, Kokotau Road Bridge, Waihenga Bridge (State Highway 53), Kahutara Road bridge

The Ruamāhanga River runs through the southeastern North Island of New Zealand.

== Geography ==
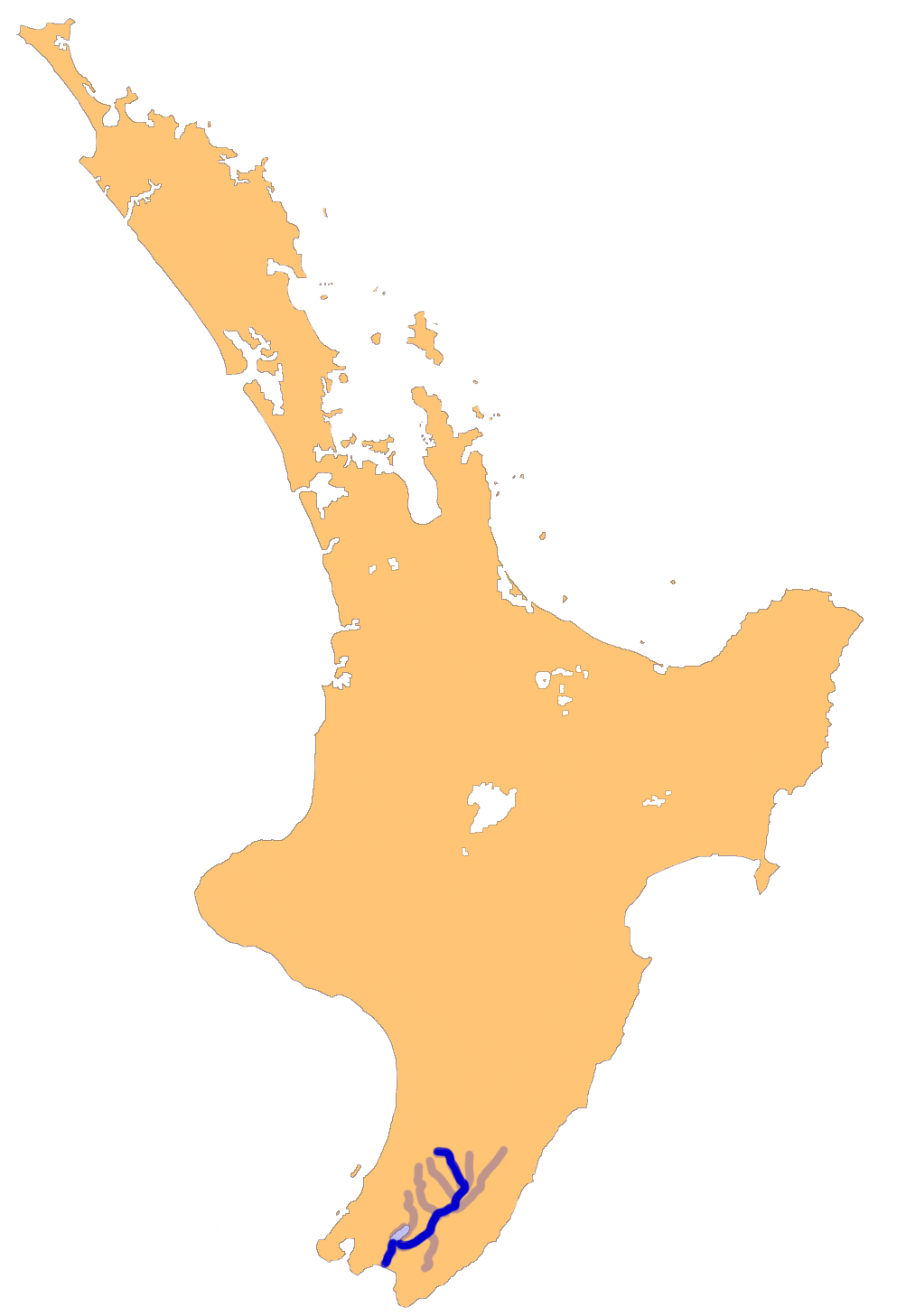
The Ruamāhanga River system

The river's headwaters are in the Tararua Range northwest of Masterton. From there it runs firstly south and then southwest for 130 kilometres (81 mi) before emptying into the Cook Strait. The towns of Masterton and Martinborough are close to the banks of the river. It is joined by many other rivers, including the Tauweru River near Gladstone.

In its lower reaches, the river meanders across a large floodplain, culminating in the wetlands around the edges of Lake Wairarapa. The river once flowed into the lake, but has now been diverted. The river drains at Palliser Bay 10 kilometres (6 mi) further south.

The river has now become generally polluted from sewage and farming that prevents people from swimming in the river or its tributaries.

== See also ==
- List of rivers of New Zealand
- List of rivers of Wellington Region
