= Lake Ōnoke =

Lake in South Wairarapa, New Zealand

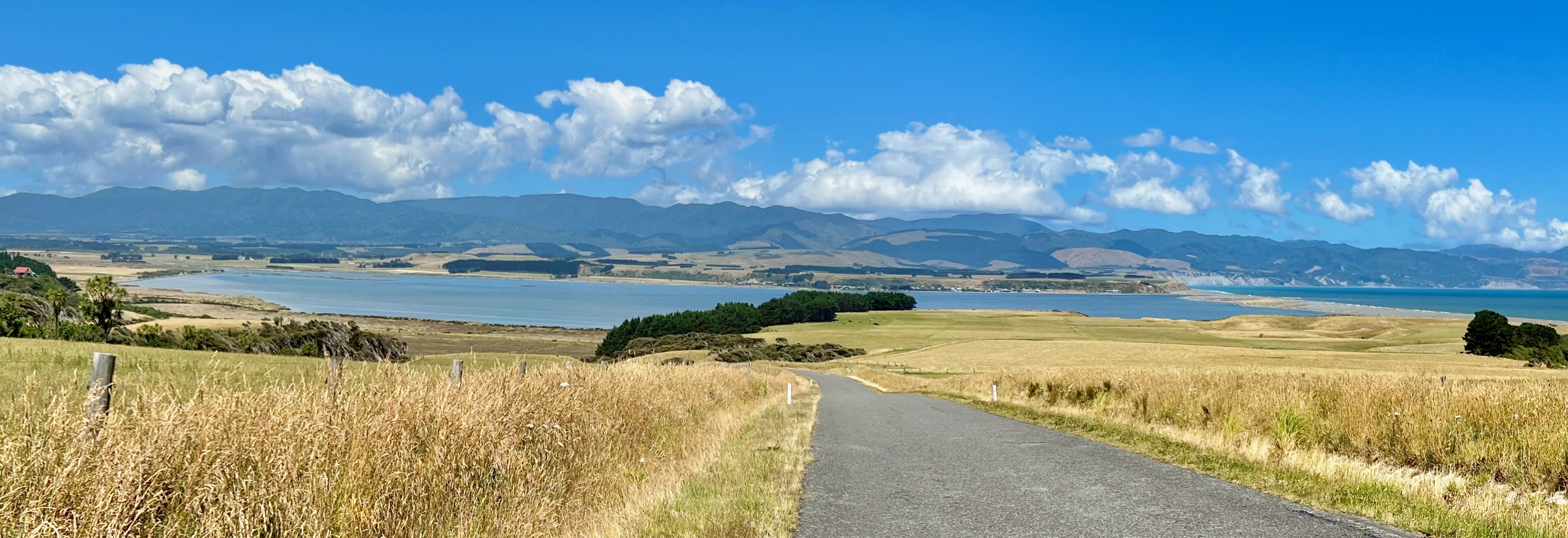
- Lake Ōnoke and Palliser Bay from Western Lake Road

- Location within North Island
- Interactive map of Lake Ōnoke
- Location: South Wairarapa District, Wellington Region
- Coordinates: 41°22′50″S 175°7′53″E
- Basin countries: New Zealand
- Max. length: 3.2 km (2.0 mi)
- Max. width: 2.7 km (1.7 mi)
- Surface area: 6.3 km^{2} (2.4 sq mi)
- Average depth: 1.5 m (4.9 ft)
- Surface elevation: 0 m (0 ft)

Lake Ōnoke is a lake located in South Wairarapa District, in the Wellington Region of New Zealand.

== Geography ==
Lake Ōnoke is a coastal lake located around 30 km (19 mi) east-southeast of Wellington city centre and 9 km (5.6 mi) south-southwest of Alsops Bay of Lake Wairarapa. The lake is around 1.5 m (4.9 ft) deep with an area of around 6.3 km^{2} (2.4 sq mi). It extends around 3.2 km (2.0 mi) along the coast parallel to Palliser Bay and around 2.7 km (1.7 mi) inland.

The lake is mainly fed by the Ruamāhanga River, but the Tūranganui River and some streams also flow into the lake. The lake has an ocean outlet to Palliser Bay at its southeastern end. The Lake Ōnoke spit, separating the lake from the ocean, is only 200 to 300 m wide and 3.5 km (2.2 mi) long.

The lake becomes noticeably shallower over the years. It was shown by studies from 1994 and 2010, in which it was found that the silting up with sediments amounts to an average of 12.5 mm per year. The lake has an average pH of 7.6.

== Lake Ferry settlement ==
Lake Ferry is a small coastal settlement on the eastern shore of Lake Ōnoke. The Palliser Bay coast is a popular fishing location and the settlement is a mixture of permanent and holiday homes, and a camping ground. There is a historic hotel close to the sea coast at the point where Lake Ōnoke flows into Palliser Bay. The name of the settlement and the hotel arises from a ferry service that previously operated across the lake outlet.

== Ocean outlet ==
The ocean outlet of Lake Ōnoke is frequently closed by natural wave action on the beach, and this can lead to rising water levels in the lake. Natural forces can lead to the opening of the lake outlet, but historically, the lake levels have been controlled by excavating a channel through the beach to the sea, to limit flooding of properties around the lake.

The outlet of Lake Ōnoke is known as a dangerous location for fishing, and there have been several drownings.
