= Palliser Bay =

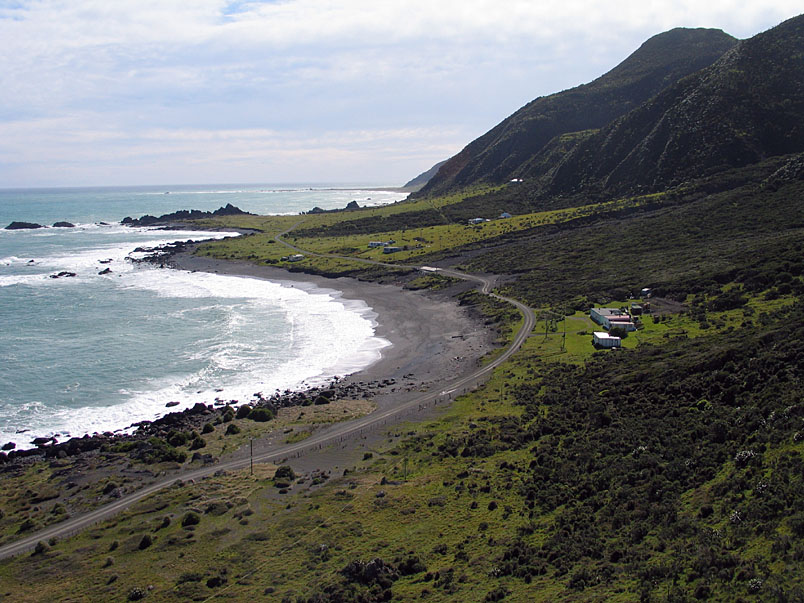
- Typical coastline in Palliser Bay
- Interactive map of Palliser Bay
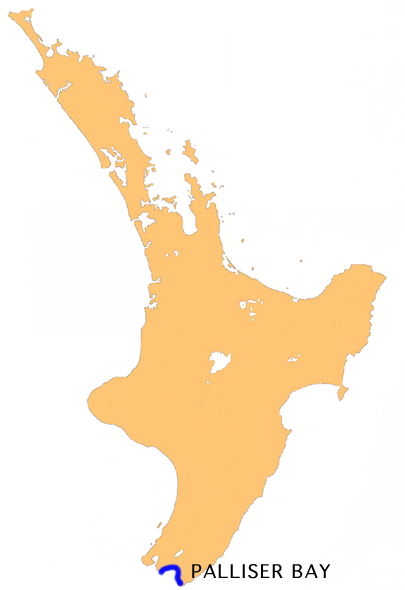
- Location of Palliser Bay
- Location: North Island
- Coordinates: 41°25′S 175°05′E
- Type: Bay
- Part of: Cook Strait/Pacific Ocean
- Basin countries: New Zealand

Palliser Bay is at the southern end of the North Island of New Zealand, to the southeast of Wellington. It runs for 40 kilometres (25 mi) along the Cook Strait coast from Turakirae Head at the southern end of the Remutaka Ranges to Cape Palliser, the North Island's southernmost point. The coastline is exposed to the weather and winds.

Inland from the bay is the plain of the Ruamāhanga River, which has its outflow in the bay. This river flows through Lake Wairarapa, 10 kilometres (6.2 mi) from the coast.

There are several notable geographical features in the area, including the Pūtangirua Pinnacles, Kupe's Sail and the Whatarangi Bluff, the erosion of which has had dramatic effects on the coastline. Some of these cliffs are made of mudstone and are therefore easily eroded, and sometimes collapse.

== Archaeology ==
Palliser Bay is an important Māori archaeological site. Stone rows raised for cultivation along the eastern shore of Palliser Bay, noted by archaeologists as early as 1904, hinted at historic horticulture practices. The first major excavations were undertaken between 1969 and 1972, led by Foss Leach and Helen Leach. Early writers suggesed the Tini o Awa people, or their contemporaries the Kāti Māmoe or Waitaha people may have built these stone rows.

The purpose of the stone rows is not clear. The prevailing idea is that the stone was a by-product of gardening and was reused to mark the edges of plots. Another suggestion is that the stones were mined and lined up for the purpose of building rows, not necessarily for gardens. Terrace gardens on the slopes are thought to have housed crops for majority of the time Palliser Bay was settled. Kūmara and gourds are the most plausible crop, as these can withstand cooler temperatures, mature in less than 12 months, and can be stored for longer periods of time in pits. It is also suggested that one of the purposes of the stone rows is that it creates protection for sprouting crops. Although kūmara is the best fit as a staple food, it does not last all year in storage, so the Palliser Bay settlements needed other food sources.

Initially the small communities in Palliser Bay were thought to be active from AD1150 – AD1500. More recent carbon dating revealed the bay was first settled in the 1300s, with evidence for six separate communities on the eastern side and a total population of about 300. Because these groups were so small, the six settlement sites may represent same group travelling in between seasons to escape inhospitable weather. Another thought is that the six small groups were parts of a larger aggregate, and may have convened every so often for trade and/or marriage.

Quantities of foreign raw material found in these sites revealed a network of historic communication through Cook Strait, or even further: in 1970 an adze was found on a long beach ridge in Palliser Bay, locally known as the Great Wall, which had been modified with stone walls and kumara gardens before European settlement. Small adze, fishhook tabs of moa bone, chert, and obsidian flakes were commonly recovered at the beach. The adze found at the Great Wall had unusual dimensions in a New Zealand context, but was similar to those found in the Tuamotu Islands, Lower Cook Islands, Austral Islands, and the Society Islands in tropical Polynesia. It was made from basaltic rock which could be from the Cook Islands or from New Zealand.

Sea mammal hunting was common around New Zealand, but difficult in Palliser Bay because of the poor weather conditions. Compared to other coastal archaeology sites, Palliser Bay had a wider range of marine mammal species represented: New Zealand fur seals (Arctocephalus forsteri), dolphins—either dusky dolphin (Lagenorhynchus obscurus) or common dolphin (Delphinus delphis), baleen whales (Mysticeti), pilot whales (Globicephala melaena), New Zealand sea lions (Phocarctos hookeri), and southern elephant seals (Mirounga leonina). None of these species were abundant, so they were an unreliable food source. Palliser Bay exhibits both hunter-gatherer and horticulturalist systems at work simultaneously—this lack of dichotomy did not fit the prevailing view of early Māori history at the time the excavations were carried out.

Bones from a variety of fish species were found in the sites in small numbers—many still exist in the bay today, including tarakihi (Cheilodactylus macropterus), red codling (Pseudophycis bachus), and barracouta (Thyrsites atun). Archaeological sites elsewhere in New Zealand typically have very few fish species, but in greater numbers. Shellfish such as blackfoot pāua (Haliotis iris), maihi (Melagraphia and Diloma spp.), radiate limpet (Cellana radians), cat's eye snail (Lunella smaragda), brown rock shell snail (Haustrum haustorium), Cook's turban snail (Cookia sulcata), and pipi and tuatua (Paphies spp.) are thought to have made up the bulk of a shellfish diet of the early Māori communities.

It is difficult to know for sure how much this harvesting impacted shellfish populations and how quickly their numbers dropped. Polulation decline could have been caused by environmental change, changing cultural preferences, or sampling effects (the lack of excavation in areas difficult to get to, like Black Rocks). In the 12th–13th century, crayfish populations were over-collected and their numbers declined; today they still have not recovered. Although the marine resources at Palliser Bay were overexploited, it is inaccurate to think that the Māori communities at Black Rocks were ignorant or unsympathetic to the need for shellfish conservation.

Species commonly caught in the rocky inshore areas at Black Rocks in Palliser Bay were fish such as greenbone (Odax pullus) and wrasses (Pseudolabrus spp.). Shellfish species in this area that were heavily collected and exploited include maihi, radiate limpet, cat's eye snail, dentate limpet (Cellana denticulata), blackfoot pāua, yellowfoot pāua (Haliotis australis), and crayfish (Jasus edwardsii).

The sites also contained remains of birds such as the fluttering shearwater (Puffinus gavia), Hutton's shearwater (Puffinus huttoni), and red-crowned parakeet (Cyanoramphus novaezelandiae), and, less commonly, domesticated dogs/kurī. Eight fishing lure shanks were discovered that were made of moa and marine mammal bone, although some argue that moa were not hunted in this region.

The Washpool Valley was once full of native bush, but after over 800 years of significant forest fires (slash-and-burn) a grassy valley with a shingle river formed. Because there was no more dense forest, bush birds, rats, and berries declined as a food source. The resulting erosion of the Makotukutuku River was sped up, pushing sediment into shallow coastal waters and decreasing shellfish populations. The arrival of the Little Ice Age in the 16th century saw lower temperatures, more frequent heavy rainfall, and unsettled stormy weather, shortening the growing seasons of kumara and gourds.

Summer seasons between 1450 and 1800 were unpredictable, with temperatures ranging from 4°C – 30°C. Only half of the season was adequate for shellfish collecting and inshore fishing: strong wind swells lasting days made it difficult to canoe or handline fish, while gardens needed very stable shelter to be successful. The Palliser Bay settlements were abandoned some time between 1550 and 1625, probably from a combination of falling temperatures making agriculture more difficult, deforestation through fire, and soil erosion smothering shellfish beds.

== European settlement ==
Circa 1844 painting of Palliser Bay by Samuel Brees

Palliser Bay was the site of an early whaling station at Te Kopi, until the 1855 earthquake made the harbour unusable. The coast was largely abandoned but for a few cottages, and access was around the coast from Wellington.
