= Castle River (Wellington) =

- Route of the Castle River
- Mouth of the Castle River Castle River (Wellington) (North Island)

Location
- Country: New Zealand
- Island: North Island
- Region: Wellington
- District: South Wairarapa

Physical characteristics
- Source: Aorangi Range
  - coordinates: 41.47572°S 175.34231°E
  - elevation: 680 m (2,230 ft)
- Mouth: Rough Stream
  - coordinates: 41°29′19″S 175°25′20″E
  - elevation: 78 m (256 ft)
- Length: 6.2 km (3.9 mi)

Basin features
- Progression: Castle River → Rough Stream → Ōpouawe River → Pacific Ocean

The Castle River is a river in the southeast of the Wairarapa district of the North Island of New Zealand. It rises on the flanks of the Aorangi Range at the edge of the Aorangi Forest Park and flows eastward, joining Rough Stream 1.6 kilometres (1.0 mi) north of that stream's confluence with the Ōpouawe River.

== See also ==
- List of rivers of Wellington Region
- List of rivers of New Zealand
