= List of rivers of Wellington Region =

The following is a list of rivers in the Wellington Region. The list is arranged in arranged by the location of the river mouth clockwise around the bottom of the North Island. Tributaries are indented under their downstream parent's name and arranged by nearest to the source.

== Pacific Ocean (Wairarapa Coast) ==
- Mataikona River
  - Pakowhai River
- Whareama River
  - Tīnui River
- Kaihoata River
- Pāhaoa River
  - Wainuioru River
    - Whakatahine River
- Rerewhakaaitu River
- Ōterei River
- Awhea River
- Ōpouawe River
  - Cape River
  - Castle River
- Whawanui River

== Cook Strait (Palliser Bay) ==
- Ruamāhanga River
  - Kōpuaranga River
  - Waipoua River
  - Whangaehu River
  - Waingawa River
  - Tauweru River
  - Waiohine River
    - Park River
    - Hector River
    - Mangātarere Stream
  - Huangarua River
    - Mākara River
    - Ruakōkoputuna River
  - Dry River (Wellington)
  - Tauwharenīkau River
    - Waiorongomai River (Wellington)
  - Tūranganui River (Wellington)
- Wharepapa River

== Cook Strait (Wainui & Wellington Coast) ==
- Ōrongorongo River
- Wainuiomata River
- Waiwhetū Stream
- Te Awa Kairangi / Hutt River
  - Eastern Hutt River
  - Western Hutt River
  - Pākuratahi River
  - Mangaroa River
  - Akatarawa River
    - Little Akatarawa River
  - Whakatīkei River
- Kaiwharawhara Stream
  - Korimako Stream
- Waipiro Stream
- Tutaenui Stream
- Kumutoto Stream
- Waimāpihi Stream

== Tasman Sea (Kapiti Coast) ==
- Wharemauku Stream
- Waikanae River
  - Ngatiawa River
  - Rangiora River
  - Reikorangi Stream
  - Maungakōtukutuku Stream
- Ōtaki River
  - Waitewaewae River
  - Waiotauru River
