= Reikorangi Stream =

- Route of the Reikorangi Stream
- Mouth of the Reikorangi Stream Reikorangi Stream (North Island)

Location
- Country: New Zealand

Physical characteristics
- Source
  - location: Maunganui, Tararua Range
  - coordinates: 40.96639°S 175.05418°E
- Mouth
  - location: Waikanae River
  - coordinates: 40°54′28″S 175°04′40″E

Basin features
- Progression: Reikorangi Stream → Waikanae River → Rauoterangi Channel → South Taranaki Bight → Tasman Sea
- Landmarks: Akatarawa Forest, Reikorangi
- Tributaries
  - left: Saddle Creek

The Reikorangi Stream is a stream on the Kāpiti Coast of New Zealand's North Island. It is one of the Waikanae River's major tributaries. Its headwaters are in the Tararua Ranges near Maungakotukutuku, and it flows north to Reikorangi in the Akatarawa Valley, where it meets the Waikanae River.

== See also ==
- List of rivers of Wellington Region
- List of rivers of New Zealand
