= Cape River =

- Route of the Cape River
- Mouth of the Cape River Cape River (North Island)

Location
- Country: New Zealand
- Island: North Island
- Region: Wellington
- District: South Wairarapa

Physical characteristics
- Source: Aorangi Range and Mākara
  - coordinates: 41.42986°S 175.38257°E
- Mouth: Ōpouawe River
  - coordinates: 41°28′13″S 175°26′44″E
- Length: 8 km (5.0 mi)

Basin features
- Progression: Cape River → Ōpouawe River → Pacific Ocean
- Bridges: Cape River Road Bridge

The Cape River is a river of New Zealand. A tributary of the Ōpouawe River, it is located in the Wairarapa in the southern North Island.

== See also ==
- List of rivers of Wellington Region
- List of rivers of New Zealand
