= Ruakōkoputuna River =

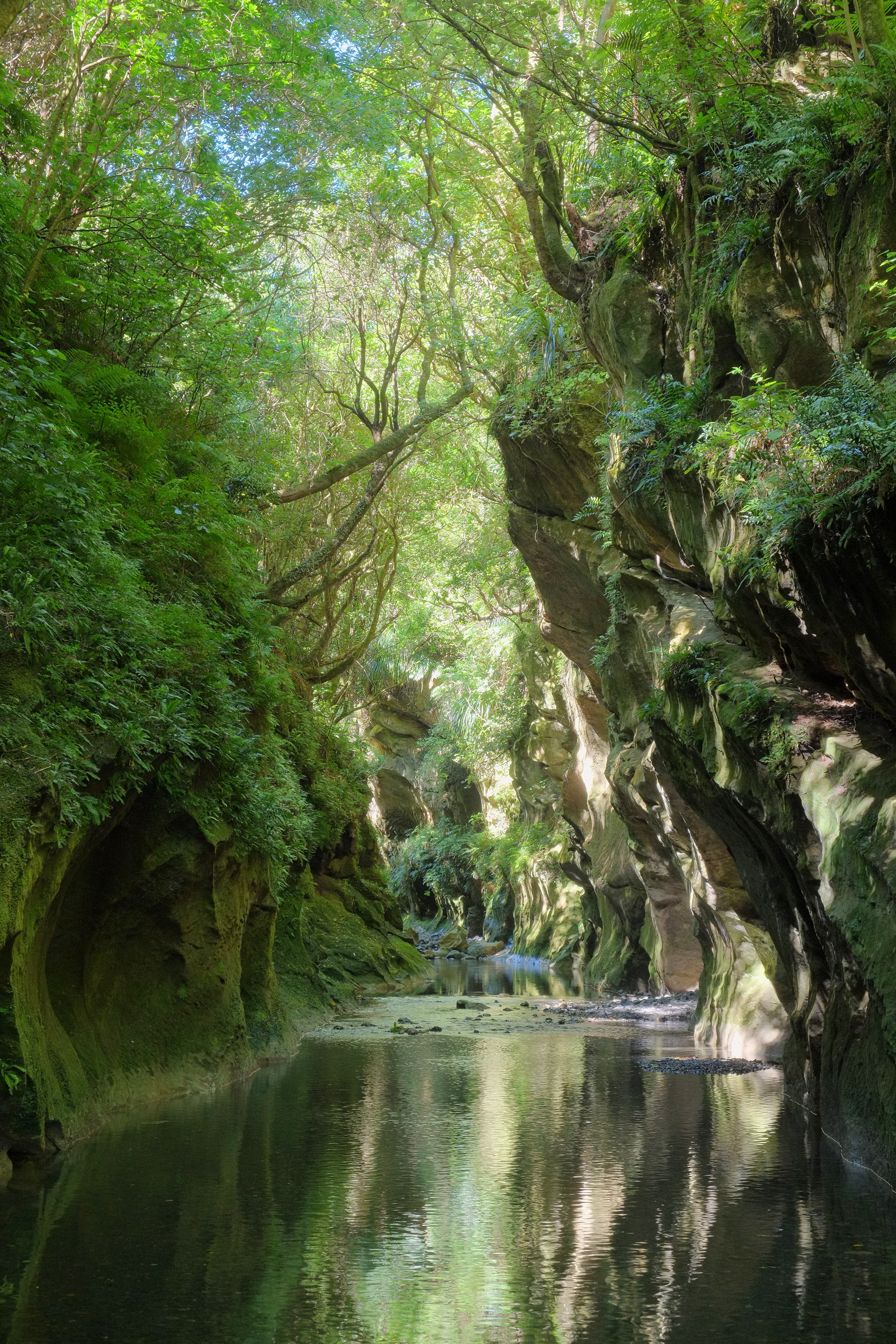
- The Ruakōkoputuna River flowing through the Patuna Chasm
- Route of the Ruakōkoputuna River
- Mouth of the Ruakōkoputuna River Ruakōkoputuna River (North Island)
- Native name: Ruakōkoputuna (Māori)

Location
- Country: New Zealand
- Island: North Island
- Region: Wellington
- District: South Wairarapa

Physical characteristics
- Source: Iraia
  - location: Aorangi Range
  - coordinates: 41.41634°S 175.35029°E
- Mouth: Huangarua River
  - coordinates: 41°17′49″S 175°28′29″E
- Length: 15 km (9.3 mi)

Basin features
- Progression: Ruakōkoputuna River → Huangarua River → Ruamāhanga River → Lake Ōnoke → Lake Ōnoke Outlet → Palliser Bay → Cook Strait → Pacific Ocean
- Tributaries
  - left: Blue Rock Stream
  - right: Clay Creek
- Bridges: Haurangi Road Bridge, White Rock Road Bridge

The Ruakōkoputuna River is a river of the Wairarapa, in the Wellington Region of New Zealand's North Island. It flows northeast from its sources within Haurangi Forest Park to the east of Palliser Bay, reaching the Huangarua River 10 kilometres (6 mi) south of Martinborough. The river's upper section flows through the Patuna Chasm, a narrow slot canyon.

== See also ==
- List of rivers of Wellington Region
- List of rivers of New Zealand
