= Ōpouawe River =

- Route of the Ōpouawe River
- Mouth of the Ōpouawe River Ōpouawe River (North Island)
- Native name: Ōpouawe (Māori)

Location
- Country: New Zealand
- Island: North Island
- Region: Wellington
- District: South Wairarapa

Physical characteristics
- Source: Aorangi Range
  - coordinates: 41.4531°S 175.4286°E
- Mouth: Pacific Ocean
  - coordinates: 41°33′53″S 175°25′26″E
  - elevation: Sea level
- Length: 17 km (11 mi)

Basin features
- Progression: Ōpouawe River → Pacific Ocean
- Tributaries
  - left: Coopers Stream
  - right: Cape River, Rough Stream, Poley Stream
- Bridges: Cape Rive Road Bridge, White Rock Road Bridge

The Ōpouawe River is a river of the Wairarapa, in the Wellington Region of New Zealand's North Island. One of the North Island's southernmost rivers, it flows generally south to reach the Pacific Ocean close to Te Kaukau Point, 12 kilometres (7 mi) northeast of Cape Palliser.

== See also ==
- List of rivers of Wellington Region
- List of rivers of New Zealand
