= Awhea River =

- Route of the Awhea River
- Mouth of the Awhea River Awhea River (North Island)
- Native name: Awhea (Māori)

Location
- Country: New Zealand
- Island: North Island
- Region: Wellington
- District: South Wairarapa

Physical characteristics
- Source: Confluence of Waihoronuku Stream and Whakapuni Stream
  - coordinates: 41.3884°S 175.5146°E
- Mouth: Pacific Ocean
  - coordinates: 41°30′17″S 175°31′08″E
  - elevation: Sea level
- Length: 24 km (15 mi)

Basin features
- Progression: Awhea River → Pacific Ocean
- Cities: Tuturumuri, Tora Farm Settlement
- Tributaries
  - right: Stony Creek
- Bridges: Hardys Bridge No. 1, Hardys Bridge No. 2, bridge on White Rock Road north of Tuturumuri, Moores Bridge, Bridge near 256 Tora Road, Brown Hill Bridge, Tora Farm Settlement Road Bridge

The Awhea River is a river of New Zealand. It is in the Wairarapa, close to the North Island's southernmost point, and flows south for 24 kilometres (15 mi) from rough hill country south of Martinborough to reach the Pacific 20 kilometres (12 mi) to the east of Cape Palliser.

== See also ==
- List of rivers of Wellington Region
- List of rivers of New Zealand
