= Mākara River (Wellington) =

- Route of the Mākara River
- Mouth of the Mākara River Mākara River (Wellington) (North Island)
- Native name: Mākara (Māori)

Location
- Country: New Zealand
- Island: North Island
- Region: Wellington
- District: South Wairarapa

Physical characteristics
- Source: Aorangi Range
  - coordinates: 41.42841°S 175.37403°E
  - elevation: 655 m (2,149 ft)
- Mouth: Huangarua River
  - coordinates: 41°17′48″S 175°28′32″E
  - elevation: 70 m (230 ft)
- Length: 17 km (11 mi)

Basin features
- Progression: Mākara River → Huangarua River → Ruamāhanga River → Lake Ōnoke → Lake Ōnoke Outlet → Palliser Bay → Cook Strait → Pacific Ocean
- Tributaries
  - right: Haitai Stream, Mangapari Stream
- Bridges: Paruwai Road Bridge, White Rock Road Bridge

The Mākara River is a tributary of the Huangarua River, part of the Ruamāhanga River system in the North Island of New Zealand. It flows north from the Aorangi Range, reaching the Huangarua to the south of Martinborough.

== See also ==
- List of rivers of Wellington Region
- List of rivers of New Zealand
