= Whakatahine River =

- Route of the Whakatahine River
- Mouth of the Whakatahine River Whakatahine River (North Island)
- Native name: Whakatahine (Māori)

Location
- Country: New Zealand
- Island: North Island
- Region: Wellington
- District: Masterton

Physical characteristics
- Source
  - coordinates: 41.08821°S 175.91073°E
- Mouth: Wainuioru River
  - coordinates: 41°02′35″S 175°49′33″E
- Length: 19 km (12 mi)

Basin features
- Progression: Whakatahine River → Wainuioru River → Pāhaoa River → Pacific Ocean
- Bridges: Masterton Stronvar Road Bridge

The Whakatahine River is a river of the Wellington Region of New Zealand's North Island. It flows generally northwest from its source in rough hill country southeast of Masterton before turning southwest to reach the Wainuiora River.

== See also ==
- List of rivers of Wellington Region
- List of rivers of New Zealand
