= Ōterei River =

- Red-billed gulls at the Ōterei River mouth
- Route of the Ōterei River
- Mouth of the Ōterei River Ōterei River (North Island)
- Native name: Ōterei (Māori)

Location
- Country: New Zealand
- Island: North Island
- Region: Wellington
- District: South Wairarapa

Physical characteristics
- Source
  - coordinates: 41.3719°S 175.6032°E
- Mouth: Pacific Ocean
  - coordinates: 41°29′02″S 175°34′34″E
  - elevation: Sea level
- Length: 20 km (12 mi)

Basin features
- Progression: Ōterei River → Pacific Ocean
- Tributaries
  - left: Coles Creek

The Ōterei River is a river of the southern Wairarapa, in the Wellington Region of New Zealand's North Island. It flows initially northwest before turning south to reach the Pacific Ocean 30 kilometres (19 mi) northeast of Cape Palliser.

In December 2019, the approved official geographic name of the river was gazetted as "Ōterei River".

== See also ==
- List of rivers of Wellington Region
- List of rivers of New Zealand
