= Rerewhakaaitu River =

- Route of the Rerewhakaaitu River
- Mouth of the Rerewhakaaitu River Rerewhakaaitu River (North Island)
- Native name: Rerewhakaaitu (Māori)

Location
- Country: New Zealand
- Island: North Island
- Region: Wellington
- District: South Wairarapa

Physical characteristics
- Source
  - coordinates: 41.3531°S 175.58264°E
- Mouth: Pacific Ocean
  - coordinates: 41°24′53″S 175°40′28″E
  - elevation: Sea level
- Length: 16 km (9.9 mi)

Basin features
- Progression: Rerewhakaaitu River → Pacific Ocean

The Rerewhakaaitu River is a river of the Wellington Region of New Zealand's North Island. It flows southeast from its sources in rough hill country southeast of Martinborough, reaching the Pacific Ocean 40 kilometres (25 mi) northeast of Cape Palliser.

== See also ==
- List of rivers of Wellington Region
