= Maungakōtukutuku Stream =

- Route of the Maungakōtukutuku Stream
- Mouth of the Maungakōtukutuku Stream Maungakōtukutuku Stream (North Island)

Location
- Country: New Zealand

Physical characteristics
- Source
  - location: Tararua Range
  - coordinates: 40.99788°S 175.00182°E
- Mouth
  - location: Waikanae River
  - coordinates: 40°54′09″S 175°04′16″E

Basin features
- Progression: Maungakōtukutuku Stream → Waikanae River → Rauoterangi Channel → South Taranaki Bight → Tasman Sea
- Landmarks: Akatarawa Forest, Reikorangi

The Maungakōtukutuku Stream is a stream on the Kāpiti Coast of New Zealand's North Island. Its headwaters are in the Maungakotukutuku area and it is a tributary of the Waikanae River. Consideration has been given to damming the stream in order to increase the Kāpiti Coast's water supply.

== See also ==
- List of rivers of Wellington Region
- List of rivers of New Zealand
