= Huangarua River =

- Route of the Huangarua River
- Mouth of the Huangarua River Huangarua River (North Island)
- Native name: Huangarua (Māori)

Location
- Country: New Zealand
- Island: North Island
- Region: Wellington
- District: South Wairarapa

Physical characteristics
- Source: Confluence of Ruakōkoputuna River and Mākara River
  - location: White Rock Road Bridge
  - coordinates: 41.29625°S 175.47492°E
- Mouth: Ruamāhanga River
  - coordinates: 41°11′55″S 175°27′40″E
- Length: 15 km (9.3 mi)

Basin features
- Progression: Huangarua River → Ruamāhanga River → Lake Ōnoke → Lake Ōnoke Outlet → Palliser Bay → Cook Strait → Pacific Ocean
- Tributaries
  - right: Whangaehu Stream
- Bridges: White Rock Road Bridge, Hinekura Road Bridge, Ponatahi Road Bridge

The Huangarua River is a river of the southern North Island of New Zealand. Rising in the foothills of the Aorangi Range it flows north to join the Ruamāhanga River to the north of Martinborough.

== See also ==
- List of rivers of Wellington Region
- List of rivers of New Zealand
