= Rangiora River =

- Route of the Rangiora River
- Mouth of the Rangiora River Rangiora River (North Island)

Location
- Country: New Zealand

Physical characteristics
- Source
  - location: Tararua Range
  - coordinates: 40.95845°S 175.15898°E
- Mouth
  - location: Waikanae River
  - coordinates: 40°54′20″S 175°04′51″E

Basin features
- Progression: Rangiora River → Waikanae River → Rauoterangi Channel → South Taranaki Bight → Tasman Sea
- Landmarks: Reikorangi

The Rangiora River is a river of the Wellington Region of the North Island of New Zealand. It is a tributary of the Waikanae River, which it joins 5 kilometres (3 mi) southeast of Waikanae.

== See also ==
- List of rivers of Wellington Region
- List of rivers of New Zealand
