= Mangaroa River =

River on North Island, New Zealand

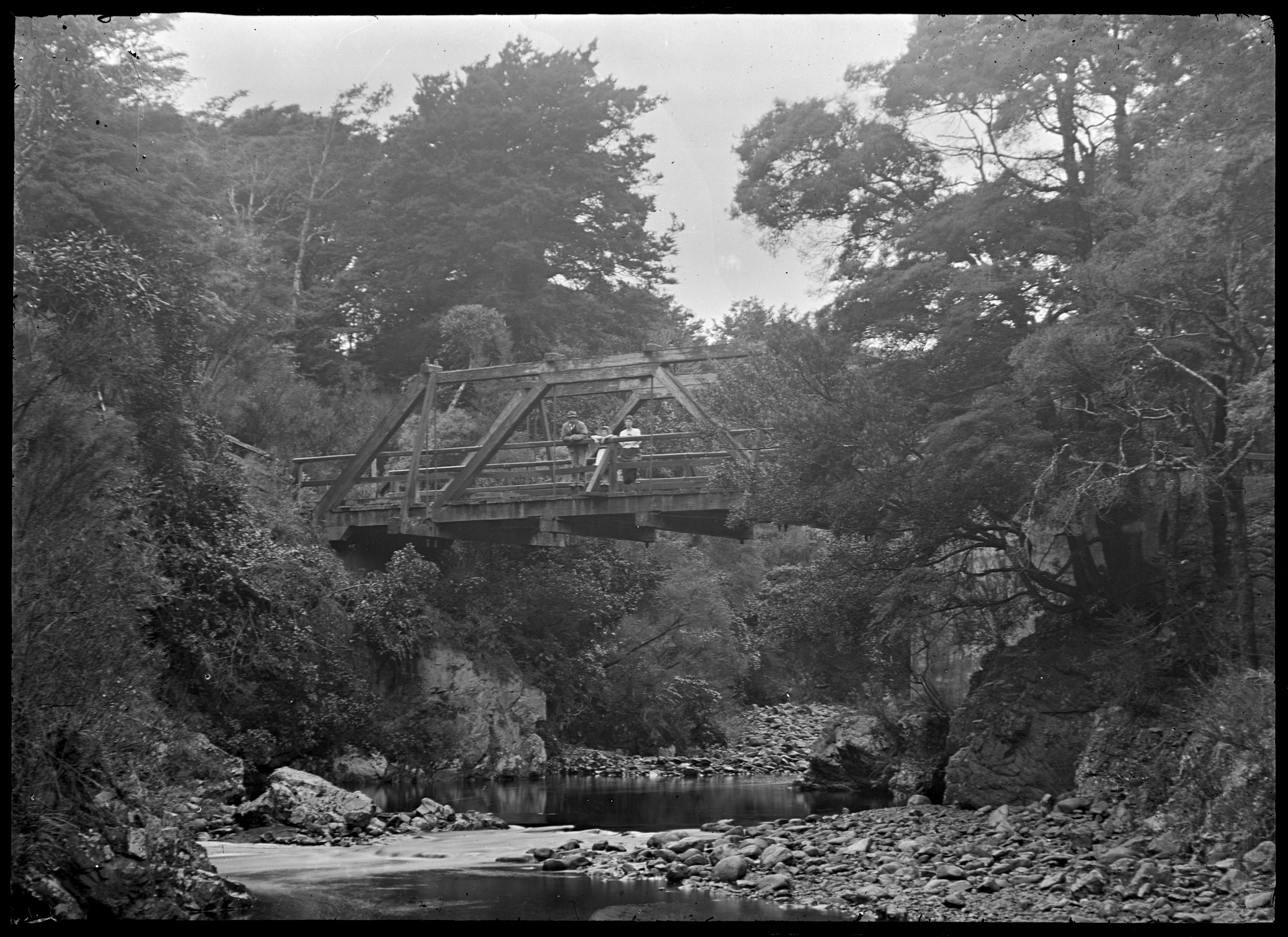
- Traffic bridge over the Mangaroa River, ca. 1924
- Route of the Mangaroa River
- Mouth of the Mangaroa River Mangaroa River (North Island)
- Native name: Te Awa o Mangaroa (Māori)

Location
- Country: New Zealand
- Island: North Island
- Region: Wellington
- District: Upper Hutt

Physical characteristics
- Source: Remutaka Ranges
  - location: EM Peak
  - coordinates: 41.2137°S 175.0003°E
- Mouth: Te Awa Kairangi / Hutt River
  - location: Te Mārua (Upper Hutt)
  - coordinates: 41°05′37″S 175°07′33″E
- Length: 21 km (13 mi)
- Basin size: 103 km^{2} (40 sq mi)

Basin features
- Progression: Mangaroa River → Te Awa Kairangi / Hutt River → Wellington Harbour → Cook Strait → Pacific Ocean
- Cities: Whitemans Valley, Te Mārua (Upper Hutt)
- Tributaries
  - left: Black Stream
  - right: Narrow Neck Stream, Huia Stream, Cooleys Stream, Colletts Stream, Mahers Stream, Blaikie Stream, Collins Stream
- Bridges: Bridge near 914 Whitemans Valley Road, Bridge near 175 Whitemans Valley Road, Mangaroa Valley Road Bridge, Mangaroa Hill Road Bridge, Mangaroa railway bridge (Wairarapa Line), Mangaroa River Bridge (Main Road North)

The Mangaroa River is a river of the Wellington Region of New Zealand's North Island. It flows north from the western foothills of the Remutaka Range to the west of Lower Hutt, meeting with Te Awa Kairangi / Hutt River on the northern outskirts of Upper Hutt.

== Geography ==
The Mangaroa River, also known as the Mungaroa River, rises in the northeastern Remutaka Ranges to the east of the Hutt Valley, flowing primarily over open farmland through Whitemans Valley. In the lower reaches of the river, the water is peat stained from water entering the river from the Te Pango wetlands. The river flows into Te Awa Kairangi / Hutt River at the Upper Hutt suburb of Te Mārua, after passing through a steep gorge. Approximately 53% of the catchment is composed of native forests, with 31% of the area being farmland and pasture, and 14% used for managed pine plantations. Only 2% of the catchment area is covered by urban development.

== History ==
The Mangaroa River catchment was traditionally settled by Māori including Ngāti Ira, who established Whakataka Pā between the right bank of the Mangaroa River and Te Awa Kairangi / Hutt River, where large terraces of kūmara cultivations were constructed. Whakataka Pā was defeated by warriors led by Tāmati Wāka Nene of Ngāpuhi and Te Rauparaha of Ngāti Toa in the early 19th century. Following these events, members of Ngāti Mutunga and Te Āti Awa travelled to the Upper Hutt area, establishing a village near the river at Te Hau-Karetu (Maoribank).

European settlers arrived in the Mangaroa River area in the 1850s.

== Recreation ==
The river is a fishing spot for brown trout.

== See also ==
- List of rivers of Wellington Region
- List of rivers of New Zealand
