= Waikanae River =

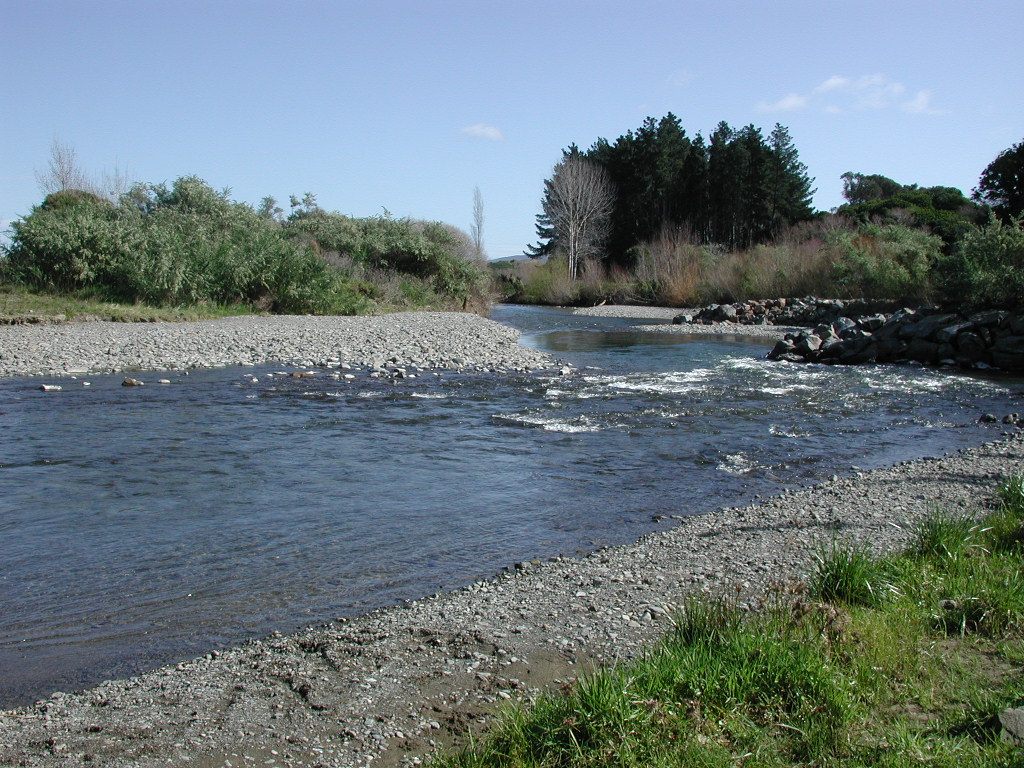
- Waikanae River flowing towards sea
- Route of the Waikanae River
- Mouth of the Waikanae River Waikanae River (North Island)
- Native name: Te Awa o Waikanae (Māori)

Location
- Country: New Zealand

Physical characteristics
- Source
  - location: Tararua Range
  - coordinates: 40.84012°S 175.13521°E
- Mouth
  - location: Rauoterangi Channel
  - coordinates: 40°52′28″S 174°59′59″E

Basin features
- Progression: Waikanae River → Rauoterangi Channel → South Taranaki Bight → Tasman Sea
- Landmarks: Reikorangi, Waikanae, Waimanu Lagoon
- Tributaries
  - left: Ngatiawa River, Rangiora River, Reikorangi Stream, Maungakōtukutuku Stream, Muaupoko Stream
  - right: Kapakapanui Stream
- Bridges: Nimmo Street Bridge, Otaihanga Suspension Bridge

Waikanae River is located on the Kāpiti Coast in the North Island of New Zealand.

== Description ==
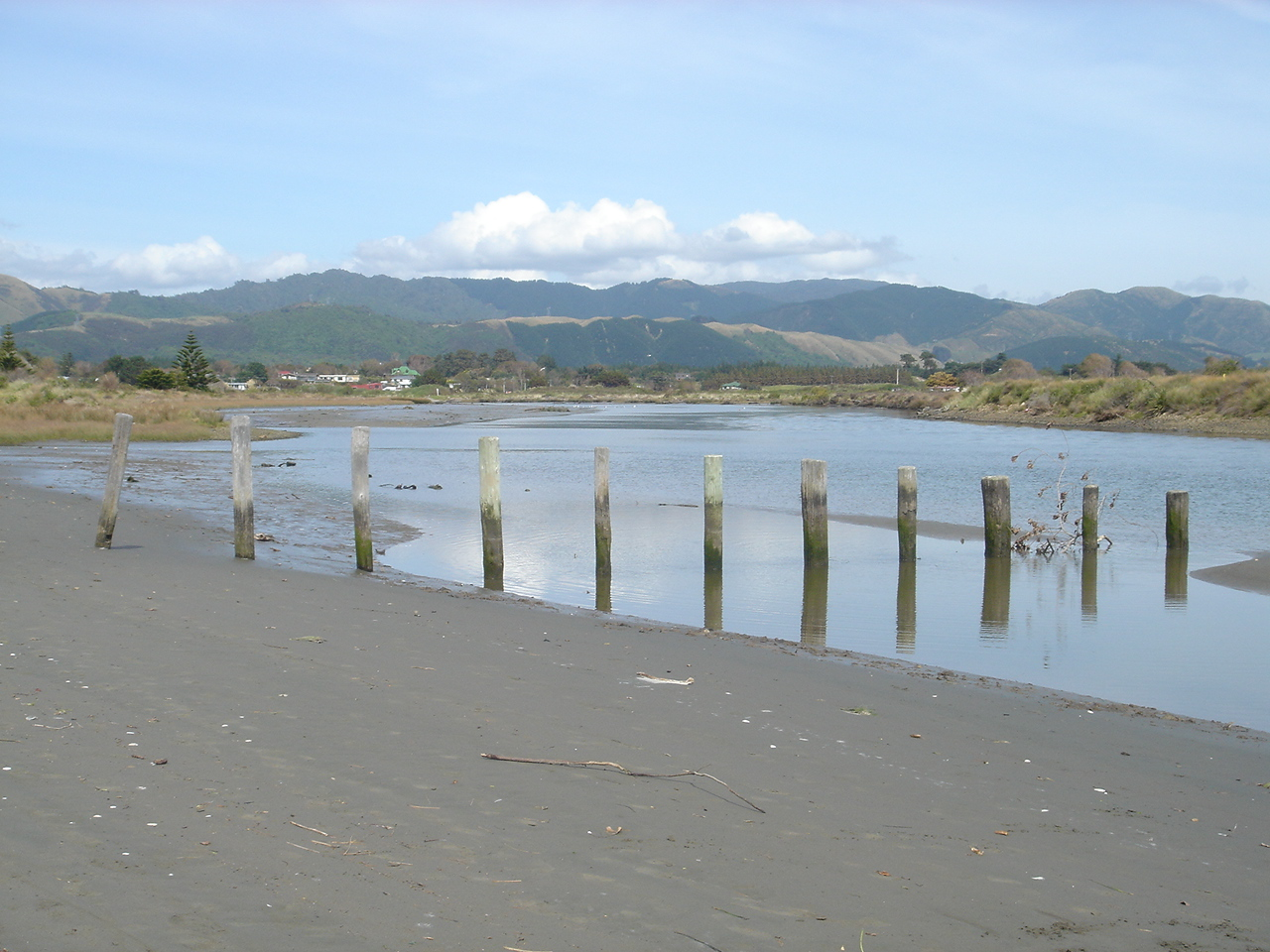
Waikanae River entering Tasman Sea at Waikanae Beach

The river drains the western flanks of the Tararua Ranges around Reikorangi and the Akatarawa Valley, then passes to the south of the town of Waikanae to the north of the river and Otaihanga/ Paraparaumu to the south before entering the Tasman Sea at Waikanae – Paraparaumu Beach. Tributaries include the Maungakōtukutuku Stream, Ngatiawa River, and Reikorangi Stream. The estuary of the river is a significant reserve providing shelter and habitat for local and migratory seabirds. It also provides a major recreational location, both for residents and tourists. Walking and cycling tracks are present on both sides of the river, leading from Waikanae Beach and Otaihanga Domain to the old state highway bridge just south Waikanae.

The estuary of the Waikanae River is ever changing, with major and minor storms disrupting the banks and causing it to change shape. Prior to storms in 2016/17, the river seamlessly transitioned into the sea, but after storms, long sandbars and banks have caused the river to take an winding path to reach the Tasman Sea.

== History ==
Water supplies for the Kāpiti Coast region are sourced from combination of bores and surface water from the river. This sometimes leads to water restrictions if the river runs low, however in January 2005 the river burst its banks after heavy rain. The river has good water quality and high aquatic biodiversity, but there are occasional blooms of toxic cyanobacteria after prolonged periods of low flow during hot, dry weather.

There have been multiple instances in earlier years (2020, 2021) where the river bank has burst, leading to several floods in the elevated areas south of the river. It came with heavy rainfall and heavy storms and cyclones in the area.

== Bridges ==
The first bridge was built about 1885 by the Wellington and Manawatu Railway Company. It was a 3-span timber truss bridge. In 1925 a fence of old rails was built to protect the bridge, backed by fifteen old square iron tanks (sent from East Town), filled with river bed stones. By 1938 the bridge had been rebuilt in steel and concrete. In 2017 a mural of a kingfisher was painted on to it.

The next bridge was built nearby and opened in 1901. It was also 3 timber spans and 247 ft (75 m) long.

In 1964 a bridge opened to the then State Highway 1. In 2024 a pedestrian and cyclist lane was added to it.

The latest bridge is on the Kāpiti Expressway. It is a single T-beam, 35 m (115 ft) above the river, with a 39 m (128 ft) span.

There are also a few walking bridges built by the Kāpiti Coast District on the river walking paths, such as the Otaihanga Domain Bridge, and Te Arawai Bridge.

== See also ==
- List of rivers of Wellington Region
- List of rivers of New Zealand
