= Whareama River =

- Route of the Whareama River
- Mouth of the Whareama River Whareama River (North Island)
- Native name: Whareama (Māori)

Location
- Country: New Zealand
- Island: North Island
- Region: Wellington
- District: Masterton

Physical characteristics
- Source
  - coordinates: 40.74303°S 176.10972°E
- Mouth: Pacific Ocean
  - coordinates: 41°00′58″S 176°06′28″E
  - elevation: Sea level
- Length: 39 km (24 mi)

Basin features
- Progression: Whareama River → Pacific Ocean
- Cities: Tīnui, Whareama
- Tributaries
  - left: Morepork Stream, Tīnui River, Bush Hill Stream
  - right: Ratanui Stream, Woody Gully Stream, Axehandle Stream, Annedale Stream, Mākirikiri Stream, Rewa Rewa Stream, Flag Creek, Mangapakeha Stream, Mangapokia Stream, Waihora Stream, Kohiwai Stream, Mangapokio Stream
- Bridges: Bridge near 1963 Annedale Road, Bridge near 1655 Annedale Road, Bridge near 1037 Manawa Road, Bridge near 772 Manawa Road, Masterton-Castlepoint Road Bridge, Waimimi Road Bridge

The Whareama River is a river of the Wellington Region of New Zealand's North Island. It flows generally south from its origins west of Castlepoint to reach the Pacific Ocean 40 kilometres (25 mi) east of Masterton.

== See also ==
- List of rivers of New Zealand
- List of rivers of Wellington Region
