= Little Akatarawa River =

- Route of the Little Akatarawa River
- Mouth of the Little Akatarawa River Little Akatarawa River (North Island)

Location
- Country: New Zealand
- Island: North Island
- Region: Wellington
- District: Upper Hutt

Physical characteristics
- Source: Mount Barton
  - coordinates: 41.03814°S 175.09909°E
- Mouth: Akatarawa River West
  - coordinates: 41°03′23″S 175°05′29″E
- Length: 6 km (3.7 mi)

Basin features
- Progression: Little Akatarawa River → Akatarawa River West → Akatarawa River → Te Awa Kairangi / Hutt River → Wellington Harbour → Cook Strait → Pacific Ocean

The Little Akatarawa River is a river of the Wellington Region of New Zealand's North Island. It is a tributary of the Akatarawa River, which it meets 5 kilometres (3 mi) northwest of Te Mārua.

== See also ==
- List of rivers of Wellington Region
- List of rivers of New Zealand
