= Wharepapa River =

- Route of the Wharepapa River
- Mouth of the Wharepapa River Wharepapa River (North Island)
- Native name: Wharepapa (Māori)

Location
- Country: New Zealand
- Island: North Island
- Region: Wellington
- District: South Wairarapa

Physical characteristics
- Source: Remutaka Range
  - coordinates: 41.29661°S 175.07083°E
- Mouth: Palliser Bay
  - location: Ocean Beach
  - coordinates: 41°22′46″S 175°04′40″E
- Length: 10 km (6.2 mi)

Basin features
- Progression: Wharepapa River → Palliser Bay → Cook Strait → Pacific Ocean
- Tributaries
  - right: Papatahi Stream
- Bridges: Wharekaukau Road Bridge

The Wharepapa River is a river of the Wellington Region of New Zealand's North Island. It flows south from its sources within Remutaka Forest Park to reach the western end of Palliser Bay close to the small settlement of Wharekauhau.

== See also ==
- List of rivers of Wellington Region
- List of rivers of New Zealand
