= Pakowhai River =

- Route of the Pakowhai River
- Mouth of the Pakowhai River Pakowhai River (North Island)
- Native name: Pakowhai (Māori)

Location
- Country: New Zealand
- Island: North Island
- Region: Wellington
- District: Masterton, Tararua

Physical characteristics
- Source: Tanawa
  - coordinates: 40.7367°S 176.1532°E
- Mouth: Mataikona River
  - coordinates: 40°42′24″S 176°13′33″E
- Length: 18 km (11 mi)

Basin features
- Progression: Pongaroa River → Mataikona River → Pacific Ocean
- Tributaries
  - left: Wingate Stream, Makoura Stream

The Pakowhai River is a river of the Wairarapa, in the Wellington Region of New Zealand's North Island. It flows initially north then east from its sources northeast of Masterton, reaching the Mataikona River 10 kilometres (6 mi) from the coast of the Pacific Ocean.

== See also ==
- List of rivers of New Zealand
- List of rivers of Wellington Region
