= Tīnui River =

- Route of the Tīnui River
- Mouth of the Tīnui River Tīnui River (North Island)
- Native name: Tīnui (Māori)

Location
- Country: New Zealand
- Island: North Island
- Region: Wellington
- District: Masterton

Physical characteristics
- Source
  - coordinates: 40.74713°S 176.10826°E
- Mouth: Whareama River
  - coordinates: 40°52′35″S 176°04′42″E
- Length: 16 km (9.9 mi)

Basin features
- Progression: Tīnui River → Whareama River → Pacific Ocean
- Cities: Tīnui
- Tributaries
  - left: Takiritini Stream, Motupaua Stream, Te Wakaaraho Stream
- Bridges: Bridge near 1529 Tinui Valley Road, Bridge north of 1329 Tinui Valley Road, Bridge south of 1329 Tinui Valley Road, Bridge near 619 Tinui Valley Road, Bridge near 4541 Masterton-Castlepoint Road

The Tīnui River is a river of the Wellington Region of New Zealand's North Island. It flows initially east from its origins in the northern Wairarapa before turning southwest to flow parallel with the Pacific coast. It reaches the Whareama River at the settlement of Tīnui, 30 kilometres (19 mi) east of Masterton.

== See also ==
- List of rivers of Wellington Region
- List of rivers of New Zealand
