= Whitemans Valley =

- Rural locality
- Interactive map of Whitemans Valley
- Coordinates: 41.166°S 175.085°E
- Country: New Zealand
- Region: Wellington Region
- City: Upper Hutt
- Electorates: Remutaka; Ikaroa-Rāwhiti (Māori)

Government
  - Territorial Authority: Upper Hutt City Council
  - Regional council: Greater Wellington Regional Council
  - Mayor of Upper Hutt: Peri Zee
  - Remutaka MP: Chris Hipkins
  - Ikaroa-Rāwhiti MP: Cushla Tangaere-Manuel

Area
  - Total: 37.01 km^{2} (14.29 sq mi)

Population (2023 census)
  - Total: 744
  - Density: 20.1/km^{2} (52.1/sq mi)

Whitemans Valley is a rural locality of Upper Hutt located in the lower North Island of New Zealand. Situated roughly 4 kilometers south of the Upper Hutt city centre, the area has a variety of farms and lifestyle blocks.

The first settler to discover the valley was George Whiteman in 1846 while he was pig-hunting. Settlement in the valley was founded by the Whiteman family in 1871.

== Geography ==
The Mangaroa River flows through Whitemans Valley.

== Demographics ==
Whitemans Valley covers 37.01 km^{2} (14.29 sq mi), and is part of Mangaroa statistical area.

Historical population
Year	Pop.	±% p.a.
2006	573	—
2013	690	+2.69%
2018	723	+0.94%
2023	744	+0.57%
The 2006 population is for a larger area of 75.46 km^{2}. Source:

Whitemans Valley had a population of 744 in the 2023 New Zealand census, an increase of 21 people (2.9%) since the 2018 census, and an increase of 54 people (7.8%) since the 2013 census. There were 357 males and 387 females in 258 dwellings. 3.6% of people identified as LGBTIQ+. There were 135 people (18.1%) aged under 15 years, 120 (16.1%) aged 15 to 29, 405 (54.4%) aged 30 to 64, and 84 (11.3%) aged 65 or older.

People could identify as more than one ethnicity. The results were 93.5% European (Pākehā); 8.9% Māori; 0.4% Pasifika; 2.8% Asian; 0.4% Middle Eastern, Latin American and African New Zealanders (MELAA); and 4.4% other, which includes people giving their ethnicity as "New Zealander". English was spoken by 98.0%, Māori by 1.2%, and other languages by 5.6%. No language could be spoken by 2.4% (e.g. too young to talk). The percentage of people born overseas was 17.7, compared with 28.8% nationally.

Religious affiliations were 25.8% Christian, 0.4% Islam, 0.8% New Age, and 2.4% other religions. People who answered that they had no religion were 62.5%, and 7.7% of people did not answer the census question.

Of those at least 15 years old, 159 (26.1%) people had a bachelor's or higher degree, 372 (61.1%) had a post-high school certificate or diploma, and 75 (12.3%) people exclusively held high school qualifications. 153 people (25.1%) earned over $100,000 compared to 12.1% nationally. The employment status of those at least 15 was 390 (64.0%) full-time, 69 (11.3%) part-time, and 9 (1.5%) unemployed.

== Climate ==
Climate data for Whitemans Valley (1951–1980)
Month	Jan	Feb	Mar	Apr	May	Jun	Jul	Aug	Sep	Oct	Nov	Dec	Year
Mean daily maximum °C (°F)	19.4 (66.9)	20.1 (68.2)	17.9 (64.2)	15.6 (60.1)	13.5 (56.3)	10.7 (51.3)	10.1 (50.2)	11.1 (52.0)	12.3 (54.1)	13.7 (56.7)	16.2 (61.2)	17.6 (63.7)	14.8 (58.7)
Daily mean °C (°F)	14.9 (58.8)	15.2 (59.4)	13.2 (55.8)	11.2 (52.2)	9.2 (48.6)	6.6 (43.9)	6.5 (43.7)	7.3 (45.1)	8.8 (47.8)	10.1 (50.2)	11.8 (53.2)	13.2 (55.8)	10.7 (51.2)
Mean daily minimum °C (°F)	10.3 (50.5)	10.2 (50.4)	8.4 (47.1)	6.8 (44.2)	4.8 (40.6)	2.4 (36.3)	2.9 (37.2)	3.5 (38.3)	5.2 (41.4)	6.4 (43.5)	7.3 (45.1)	8.8 (47.8)	6.4 (43.5)
Average rainfall mm (inches)	106 (4.2)	87 (3.4)	128 (5.0)	112 (4.4)	164 (6.5)	169 (6.7)	177 (7.0)	155 (6.1)	110 (4.3)	124 (4.9)	128 (5.0)	116 (4.6)	1,576 (62.1)
Source: NIWA
