= Wainuioru River =

- Route of the Wainuioru River
- Mouth of the Wainuioru River Wainuioru River (North Island)
- Native name: Wainuioru (Māori)

Location
- Country: New Zealand
- Island: North Island
- Region: Wellington
- District: Masterton, Carterton, South Wairarapa

Physical characteristics
- Source
  - coordinates: 41.06793°S 175.9457°E
- Mouth: Wainuioru River
  - coordinates: 41°15′31″S 175°44′04″E
- Length: 46 km (29 mi)

Basin features
- Progression: Wainuioru River → Pāhaoa River → Pacific Ocean
- Tributaries
  - left: Waipapa Stream, Whakatahine River, Upokongaruru Stream, Kuamahanga Stream, Ōpunake Stream, Waipunga Stream
  - right: Awatiritiri Stream, Makahaka Stream, Waipapa Stream, Maungatepopo Stream, Mangoariki Stream, Pahuri Stream, Maurioho Stream, Whakangaire Stream, Ririwai Stream, Whāngaiotekapinga Stream
- Bridges: Masterton Stronvar Road Bridge, Te Wharau Road Bridge, Clifton Grove Road Bridge

The Wainuioru River is a river of the Wellington Region of New Zealand's North Island. A major tributary of the Pāhaoa River, it follows a twisting generally southwestward course from its origins 25 kilometres east of Masterton, reaching the Pahaoa 20 kilometres (12 mi) southeast of Martinborough.

== See also ==
- List of rivers of Wellington Region
- List of rivers of New Zealand
