= Ngawi, New Zealand =

Village in Wellington, New Zealand

Ngawi
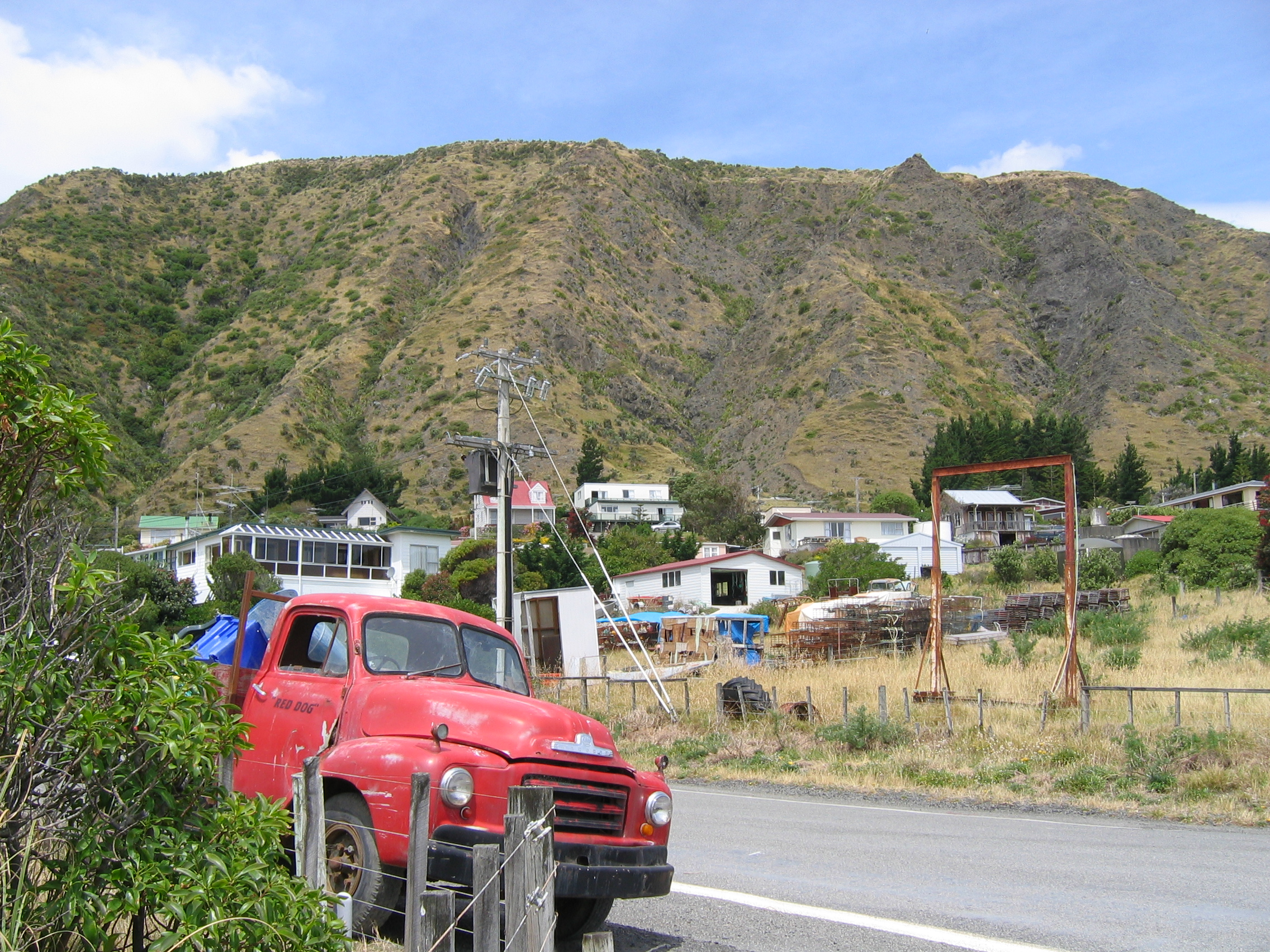
- Ngawi Fishing Village
- Interactive map of Ngawi
- Coordinates: 41°35′15.34″S 175°14′5.08″E
- Country: New Zealand
- Region: Wellington
- Territorial authority: South Wairarapa District
- Ward: Ngawi
- Electorates: Wairarapa; Ikaroa-Rāwhiti (Māori)

Government
  - Territorial Authority: South Wairarapa District Council
  - Regional council: Greater Wellington Regional Council
  - Mayor of South Wairarapa: Fran Wilde
  - Wairarapa MP: Mike Butterick
  - Ikaroa-Rāwhiti MP: Cushla Tangaere-Manuel

Area
  - Total: 5.48 km^{2} (2.12 sq mi)

Population (2023 Census)
  - Total: 51
  - Density: 9.3/km^{2} (24/sq mi)
- Time zone: UTC+12 (NZST)
  - Summer (DST): UTC+13 (NZDT)
- Area code: 06

Ngawi (pronounced "ngaa-wee") is a small fishing / holiday village within five kilometres of Cape Palliser, the southern-most point of New Zealand's North Island.

The New Zealand Ministry for Culture and Heritage gives a translation of Ngāwī as "the native tussock grass".

The area is popular with commercial and recreational fishermen. The fishery includes pāua (a type of abalone which is prized for its iridescent shell as well as the flesh), crayfish, and cod.

Ngawi has more bulldozers per capita than anywhere else. The bulldozers are used to haul fishing boats into and out of the water as there is no wharf or other access to the ocean other than the beach, which can be notoriously rough. Crayfish (also known as rock lobster) are caught commercially for live export. In 2011, there were around a dozen commercial fishermen working from Ngawi, but most did not live in the village.

The village comprises mainly small wooden houses, called baches. The population is much larger during the summer season, when all the holiday homes are occupied. There are no shops in Ngawi, and the nearest school is at Pirinoa, around 37.5 kilometres (23.3 mi) to the north.

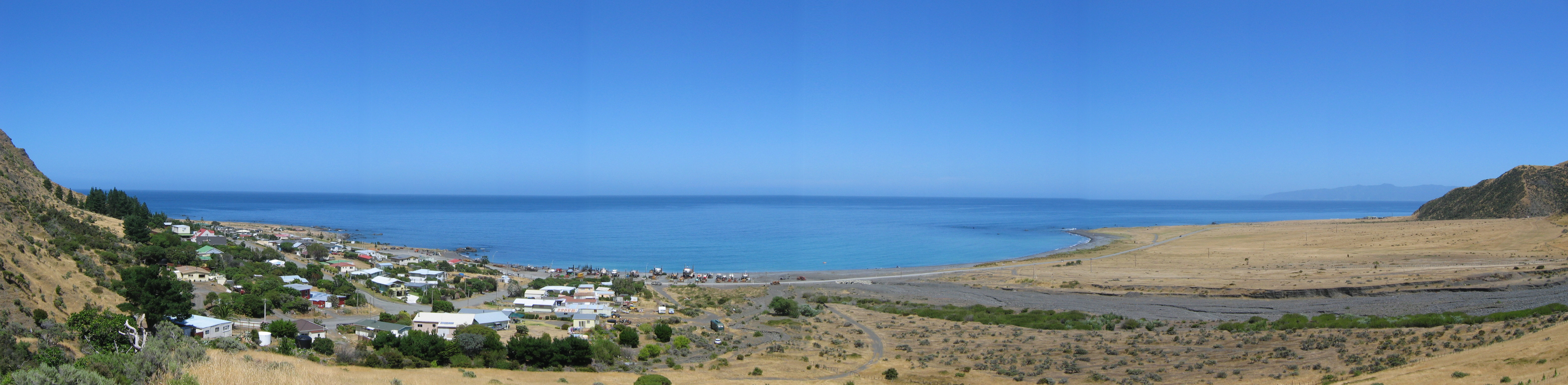
Panoramic View of Ngawi and Palliser Bay

== Geography and environment ==
Ngawi is situated on the southern coast of New Zealand’s North Island in the Palliser Bay region, near the southernmost point at Cape Palliser. The village lies along an exposed stretch of coastline that faces the Cook Strait, meaning it is regularly battered by strong winds and southerly swells. The shore here consists of steep gravel and cobble beaches, backed by a narrow coastal plain of mixed marine and alluvial gravels and flanked by rugged hillsides inland. The vegetation is sparse and mainly hardy coastal grassland and shrubland adapted to the salty winds and rough conditions. Due to its coastal exposure and dynamic environment, coastal erosion and shifting shorelines are ongoing features of the landscape.

Ngawi’s marine environment supports diverse wildlife; just a few kilometres along the coast at Cape Palliser is one of the largest fur seal colonies in the North Island, a prominent part of the local ecosystem that draws seasonal wildlife interest. The coastal waters and reefs also sustain important fish species like paua (abalone) and crayfish, which have shaped the village’s fishing heritage.

The combination of powerful ocean conditions, clear coastal views, and minimal tree cover gives Ngawi a distinctive wild and open coastal character that contrasts with more sheltered parts of New Zealand’s shoreline.

Climate data for Ngawi (1991–2020)
Month	Jan	Feb	Mar	Apr	May	Jun	Jul	Aug	Sep	Oct	Nov	Dec	Year
Mean daily maximum °C (°F)	22.6 (72.7)	22.6 (72.7)	20.7 (69.3)	18.1 (64.6)	16.1 (61.0)	13.8 (56.8)	12.9 (55.2)	13.6 (56.5)	15.3 (59.5)	17.1 (62.8)	18.8 (65.8)	21.0 (69.8)	17.7 (63.9)
Daily mean °C (°F)	18.7 (65.7)	18.7 (65.7)	17.2 (63.0)	15.1 (59.2)	13.4 (56.1)	11.4 (52.5)	10.5 (50.9)	11.0 (51.8)	12.4 (54.3)	13.8 (56.8)	15.3 (59.5)	17.4 (63.3)	14.6 (58.2)
Mean daily minimum °C (°F)	14.8 (58.6)	14.8 (58.6)	13.7 (56.7)	12.2 (54.0)	10.8 (51.4)	8.9 (48.0)	8.1 (46.6)	8.4 (47.1)	9.5 (49.1)	10.6 (51.1)	11.8 (53.2)	13.7 (56.7)	11.4 (52.6)
Average rainfall mm (inches)	61.9 (2.44)	43.0 (1.69)	68.3 (2.69)	64.6 (2.54)	69.8 (2.75)	99.4 (3.91)	114.5 (4.51)	86.8 (3.42)	71.7 (2.82)	69.2 (2.72)	66.3 (2.61)	66.8 (2.63)	882.3 (34.73)
Source: NIWA

== Culture and history ==
Ngawi's heritage is tied closely to the broader history of the Palliser Bay area, which was inhabited by Māori communities from around the late 1300s. Archaeological research shows that early Māori people occupied the coastal strip east of Palliser Bay in several small settlements, cultivating kūmara (sweet potato) and other crops, fishing from the sea, and gathering shellfish (leaving behind features like stone walls and midden deposits that indicate long-term use of the land and sea resources). Many parts of the coastline near Ngawi, including kāinga and pā sites, are still recognised for their cultural significance to Māori.

For Māori, the wider Cape Palliser region (very near Ngawi) is also associated with traditions about the great Polynesian explorer Kupe, whose journeys across Aotearoa (New Zealand) are celebrated in local place names and stories.

European settlement in the South Wairarapa region began in the mid-1800s, with pastoral farming becoming established on much of the cleared land. Within this context, Ngawi itself developed as a small commercial fishing base, taking advantage of the abundant kaimoana (seafood) such as crayfish and pāua along the exposed Cook Strait coast. Although the village never grew into a large town, it became known for its robust fishing community and its distinctive practice of using bulldozers and tractors to launch boats straight from the beach due to the absence of a sheltered harbour (a local custom that reflects the rugged working culture of the settlement).

In May 2006, filmmaker Peter Salmon shot a short film called 'Fog' in Ngawi. Salmon was drawn to the area's unique landscape and isolated feel. 'Fog' premiered at Critic's Week at the Cannes Film Festival in 2007. It stars Joe Dekkers-Reihana, Chelsie Crayford Preston, Jim Moriarty and Tina Cook.

== Demographics ==
Ngawi locality covers 5.48 km^{2} (2.12 sq mi). It is part of the larger Aorangi Forest statistical area.

Historical population
Year	Pop.	±% p.a.
2006	51	—
2013	33	−6.03%
2018	51	+9.10%
2023	51	+0.00%

Ngawi had a population of 51 in the 2023 New Zealand census, unchanged since the 2018 census, and an increase of 18 people (54.5%) since the 2013 census. There were 27 males and 21 females in 30 dwellings. The median age was 66.9 years (compared with 38.1 years nationally). There were 3 people (5.9%) aged 15 to 29, 21 (41.2%) aged 30 to 64, and 24 (47.1%) aged 65 or older.

People could identify as more than one ethnicity. The results were 94.1% European (Pākehā), and 5.9% Māori. English was spoken by 100.0%, and Māori by 5.9%. The percentage of people born overseas was 11.8, compared with 28.8% nationally.

The sole religious affiliation given was 29.4% Christian. People who answered that they had no religion were 64.7%, and 5.9% of people did not answer the census question.

Of those at least 15 years old, 6 (11.8%) people had a bachelor's or higher degree, 24 (47.1%) had a post-high school certificate or diploma, and 18 (35.3%) people exclusively held high school qualifications. The median income was $29,300, compared with $41,500 nationally. 3 people (5.9%) earned over $100,000 compared to 12.1% nationally. The employment status of those at least 15 was 18 (35.3%) full-time and 9 (17.6%) part-time.
