= Hector River =

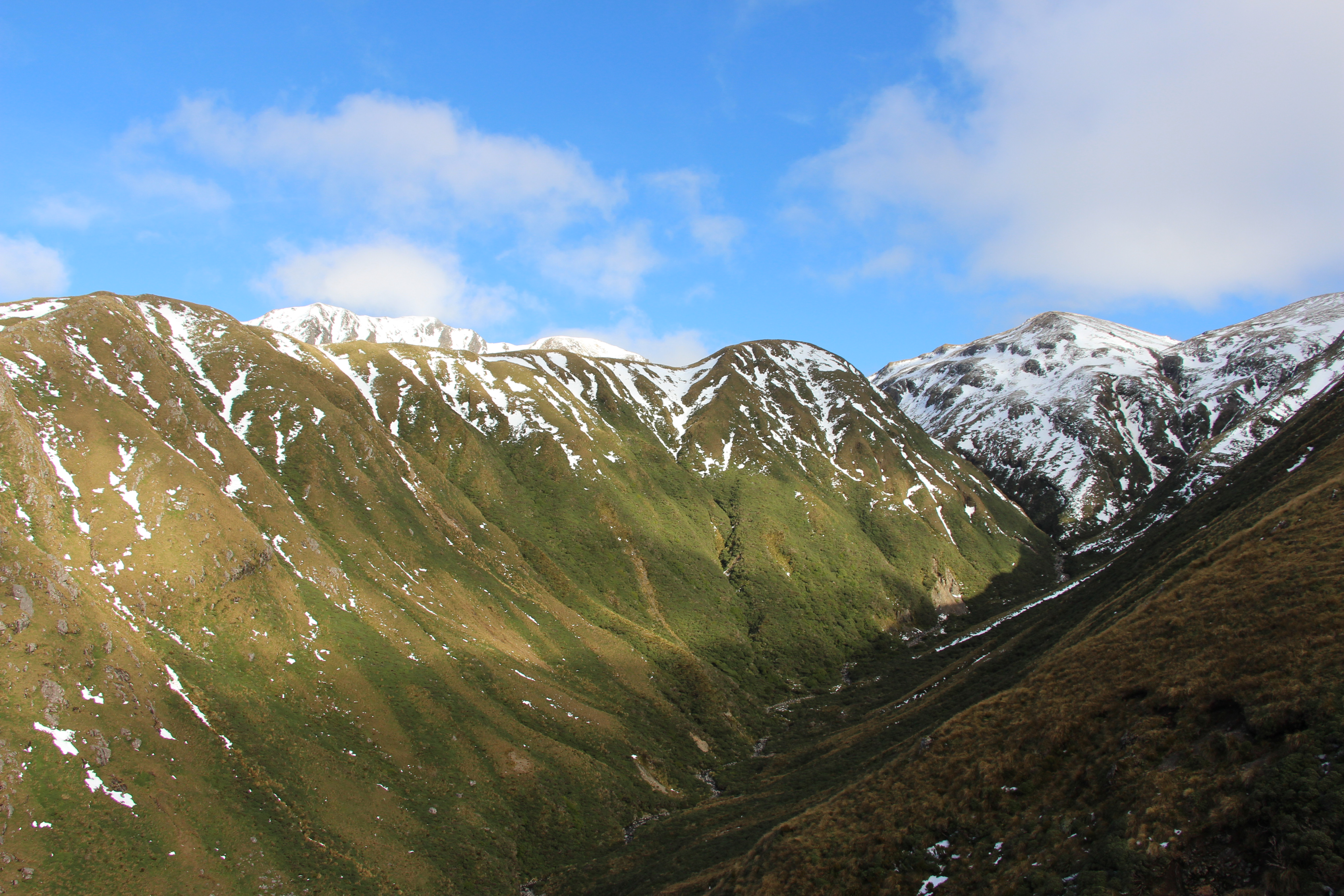
- Hector River with Mt Hector in the background
- Route of the Hector River
- Mouth of the Hector River Hector River (North Island)

Location
- Country: New Zealand
- Island: North Island
- Region: Wellington
- District: Carterton, South Wairarapa

Physical characteristics
- Source: Tararua Range
  - location: Mount Hector
  - coordinates: 40.9473°S 175.2815°E
- Mouth: Waiohine River
  - location: Hector Forks
  - coordinates: 40°55′16″S 175°22′38″E
- Length: 10 km (6.2 mi)

Basin features
- Progression: Hector River → Waiohine River → Ruamāhanga River → Lake Ōnoke → Lake Ōnoke Outlet → Palliser Bay → Cook Strait → Pacific Ocean
- Tributaries
  - left: Corkill Stream, Tarahanga Stream
  - right: Neill Creek

The Hector River is a river of New Zealand's southern North Island. It rises on the northern slopes of Mount Hector in the Tararua Range, flowing east through Tararua Forest Park before joining with the upper reaches of the Waiohine River at Hector Forks.

== See also ==
- List of rivers of Wellington Region
- List of rivers of New Zealand
