= Tīnui =

- Locality
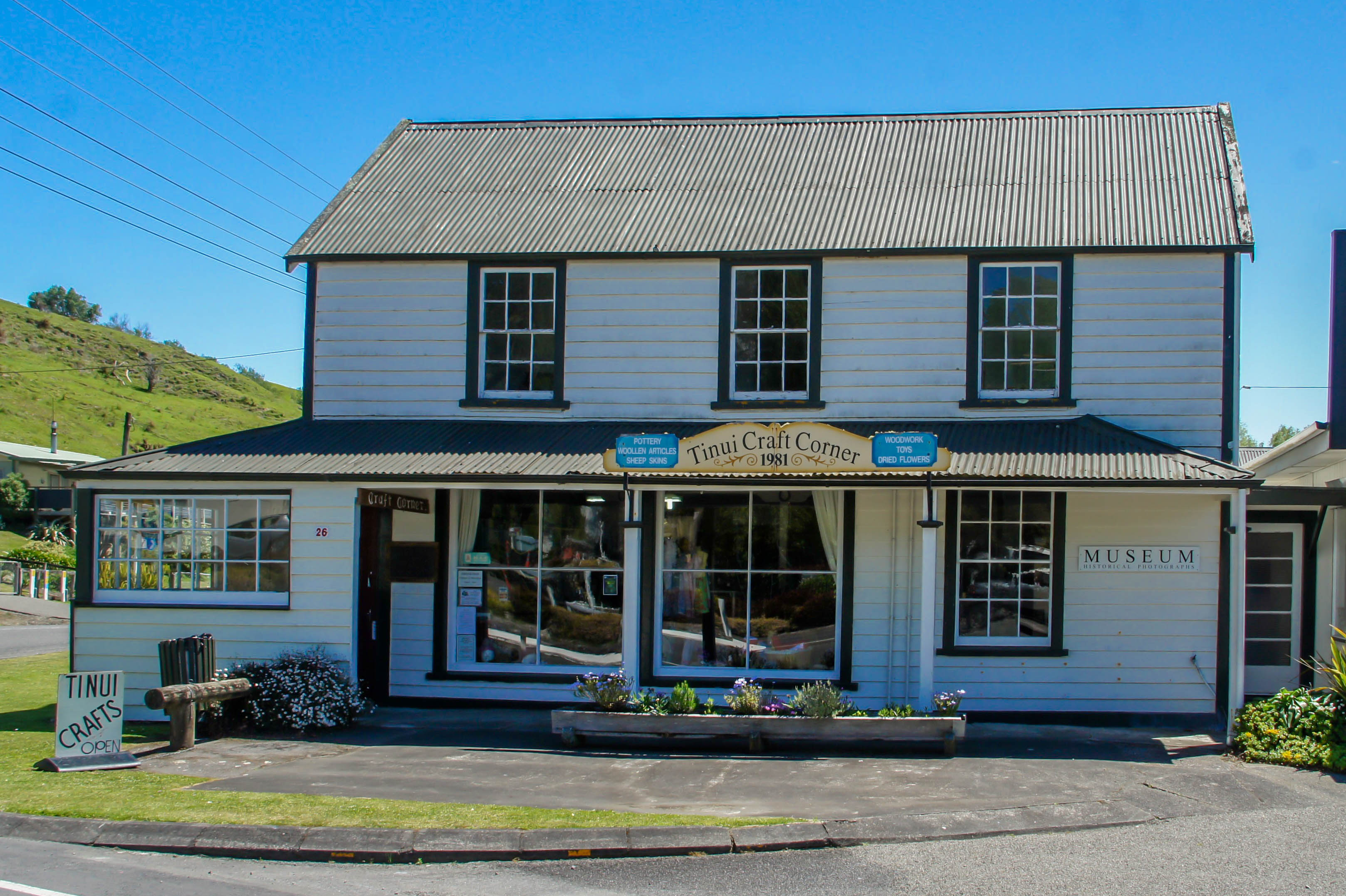
- Tīnui Museum
- Interactive map of Tīnui
- Coordinates: 40°52′40″S 176°04′20″E
- Country: New Zealand
- Region: Wellington Region
- Territorial authority: Masterton District
- Electorates: Wairarapa; Ikaroa-Rāwhiti (Māori)

Government
  - Territorial Authority: Masterton District Council
  - Regional council: Greater Wellington Regional Council
  - Mayor of Masterton: Bex Johnson
  - Wairarapa MP: Mike Butterick
  - Ikaroa-Rāwhiti MP: Cushla Tangaere-Manuel

Area
  - Total: 123.94 km^{2} (47.85 sq mi)

Population (2023 census)
  - Total: 150
  - Density: 1.2/km^{2} (3.1/sq mi)

Tīnui, also spelled Tinui and formerly spelled Tenui, is a small village approximately 40 kilometres from Masterton, in the Wairarapa, New Zealand. The name comes from the Māori words tī, cabbage tree, and nui, many.

== History ==
=== Settlement ===
The land between the Whareama and Tīnui Rivers was purchased by the Crown from the Ngāti Kahungunu and Rangitāne iwi in the mid-1850s. The settlement was founded in the 1860s and by the 1870s the small town contained churches, a school, a post office and other public buildings, as well as businesses such as blacksmiths and saddlers, cake shops and hotels. The post office and general store buildings, built in 1878, survive to the present day.

The Anglican Church of the Good Shepherd opened in 1902. The church was moved from its original site on Manawa Road to Blackhill Road in 2019 due to the ongoing flood risk. The building was restored and ownership transferred from the Anglican Diocese of Wellington to the Tīnui and Castlepoint Community Trust.

=== Anzac memorial ===
It has often been reported that Tīnui held the first Anzac memorial service in the world. However, historian Neil Frances says evidence shows there were in fact hundreds of Anzac services that took place on April 25, 1916, all over New Zealand. According to Frances, the cross placed on the Tīnui Taipo on that day, along with a flagpole at Petone are the first two memorials raised strictly to commemorate those who fell during the Gallipoli Campaign.

On 25 April 1916, the local vicar led an expedition to place a large cross to commemorate the dead on Tīnui Taipo, a 360 m (1200 ft) high promontory behind the village. The Tīnui Taipo, also known as Mount Maunsell, is part of Tinui Station, which was owned by the Maunsell family, whose son fought at Gallipoli. The family of Private John Robert Dunn who died in the attack on Chunuk Bair at Gallipoli, also lived on the station.

The original wooden cross was replaced by a metal one in 1965 and is a Category I Heritage New Zealand historic place.

In 2006, the 90th anniversary was commemorated with a 21-gun salute fired by soldiers from Waiouru Army Camp. In 2009, the Air Force began promoting Tīnui as an alternative to travelling to Gallipoli. Veterans' Affairs Minister Judith Collins said of the promotion: "I would be delighted to see Tīnui become a place where people come to pay their respects and remember those who have fallen." The centenary of the first service was marked in 2016 with a flyover during the service by four WWI aircraft from director Peter Jackson's Masterton-based collection.

=== Flooding ===
Tīnui has been flooded often, as it is situated on the river flats next to the confluence of the Whareama River and the Tīnui River. The first recorded flood was in 1858, when water covered the river flats. In 1936, floods caused thousands of sheep to drown and floodwaters reached a depth of 450 mm inside the Tīnui Hotel. The 1991 floods devastated the village when 200 mm of rain fell over a 24-hour period, and the river flooded again in July 1992.

The settlement was flooded again in February 2023 during Cyclone Gabrielle, when it was the worst-affected area in the Wairarapa, receiving three times as much rainfall as inland areas. Flood waters reached up to 400mm inside the school buildings.

The historic Tinui Hotel building was relocated to Greytown in 2008 where it became a private residence. The remaining building housing the Tinui Cafe and Bar was affected by the Cyclone Gabrielle flooding.

== Demographics ==
Tīnui locality covers 123.94 km^{2} (47.85 sq mi). It is part of the Whareama statistical area.

Historical population
Year	Pop.	±% p.a.
2006	159	—
2013	153	−0.55%
2018	144	−1.21%
2023	150	+0.82%

Tīnui had a population of 150 in the 2023 New Zealand census, an increase of 6 people (4.2%) since the 2018 census, and a decrease of 3 people (−2.0%) since the 2013 census. There were 84 males and 66 females in 60 dwellings. The median age was 42.4 years (compared with 38.1 years nationally). There were 30 people (20.0%) aged under 15 years, 24 (16.0%) aged 15 to 29, 66 (44.0%) aged 30 to 64, and 27 (18.0%) aged 65 or older.

People could identify as more than one ethnicity. The results were 88.0% European (Pākehā), 24.0% Māori, and 4.0% Pasifika. English was spoken by 98.0%, and Māori by 4.0%. No language could be spoken by 2.0% (e.g. too young to talk). The percentage of people born overseas was 8.0, compared with 28.8% nationally.

The sole religious affiliation given was 30.0% Christian. People who answered that they had no religion were 60.0%, and 8.0% of people did not answer the census question.

Of those at least 15 years old, 15 (12.5%) people had a bachelor's or higher degree, 66 (55.0%) had a post-high school certificate or diploma, and 36 (30.0%) people exclusively held high school qualifications. The median income was $33,200, compared with $41,500 nationally. 3 people (2.5%) earned over $100,000 compared to 12.1% nationally. The employment status of those at least 15 was 66 (55.0%) full-time, 18 (15.0%) part-time, and 3 (2.5%) unemployed.

== Education ==
Tīnui School is a co-educational state primary school for Year 1 to 8 students from the Mangapakeha, Tīnui, Annedale, Tīnui Valley, Whakataki, Castlepoint, and Mataikona areas. It has a roll of 20 as of July 2026.

The school opened in 1876 with a combination master's residence and boarding school on Manawa Road, before moving to its current Charles Street site in 1955.

== Gallery ==
Tīnui

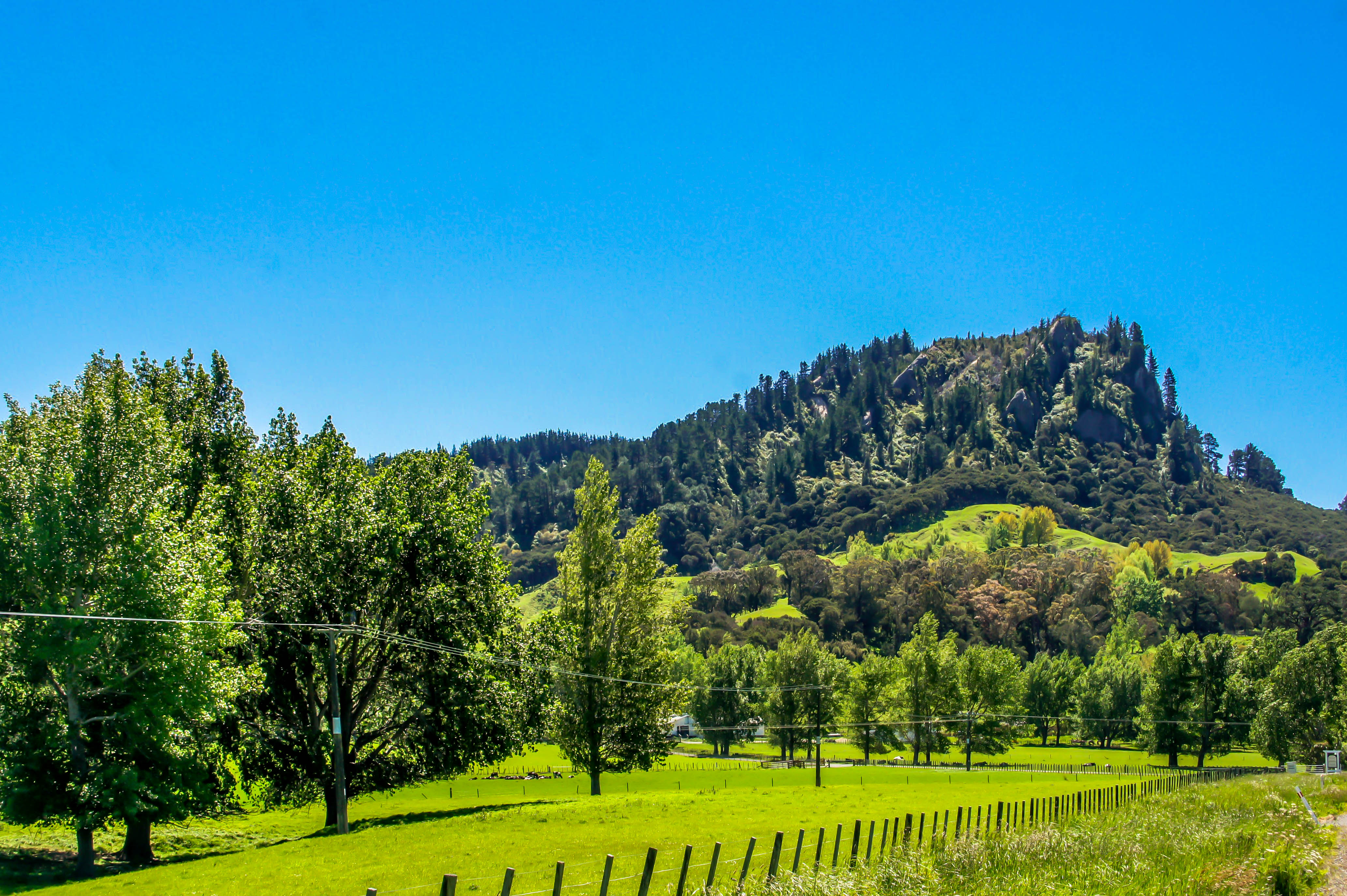
Tīnui Taipo

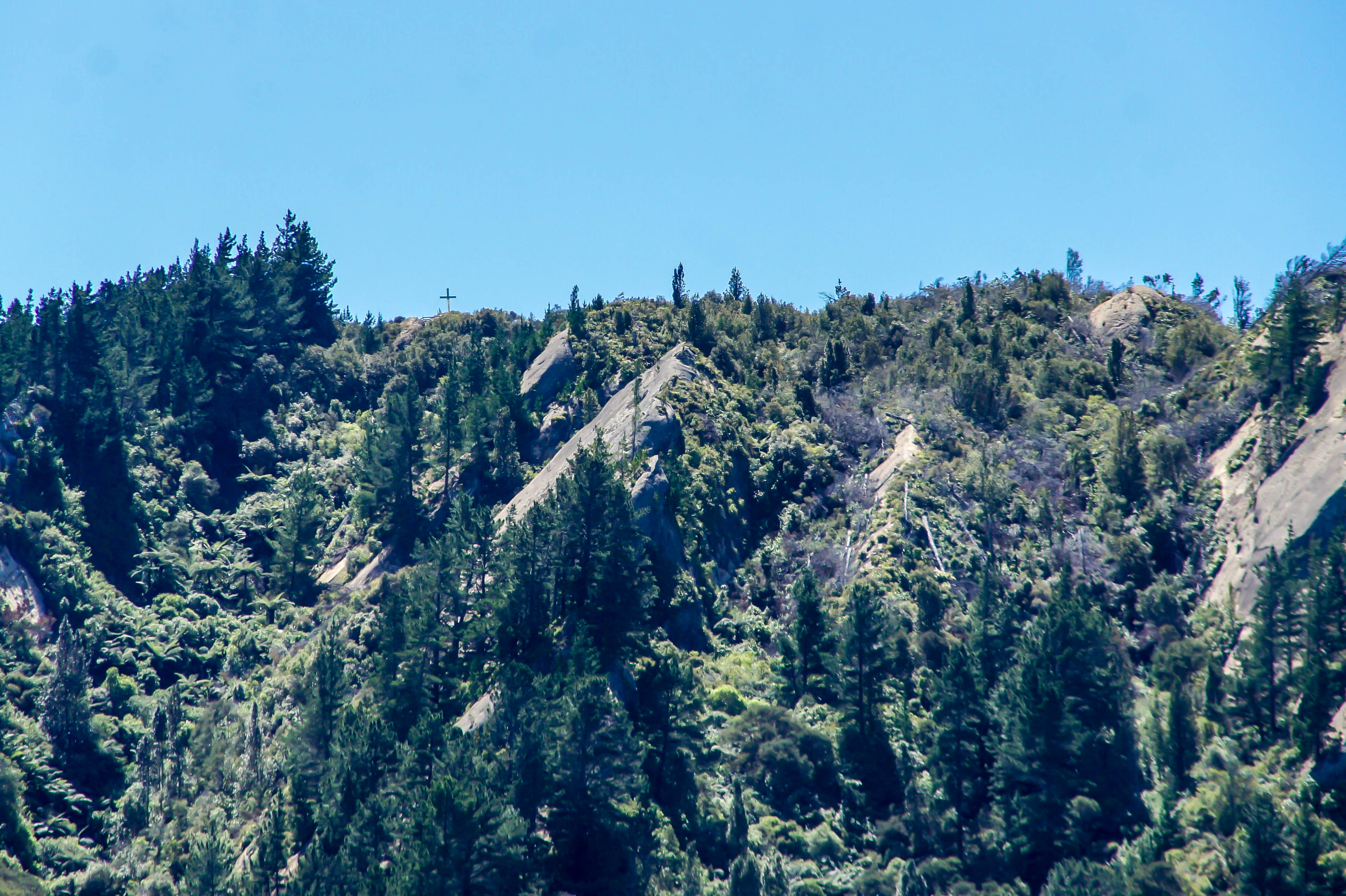
The cross on the hill

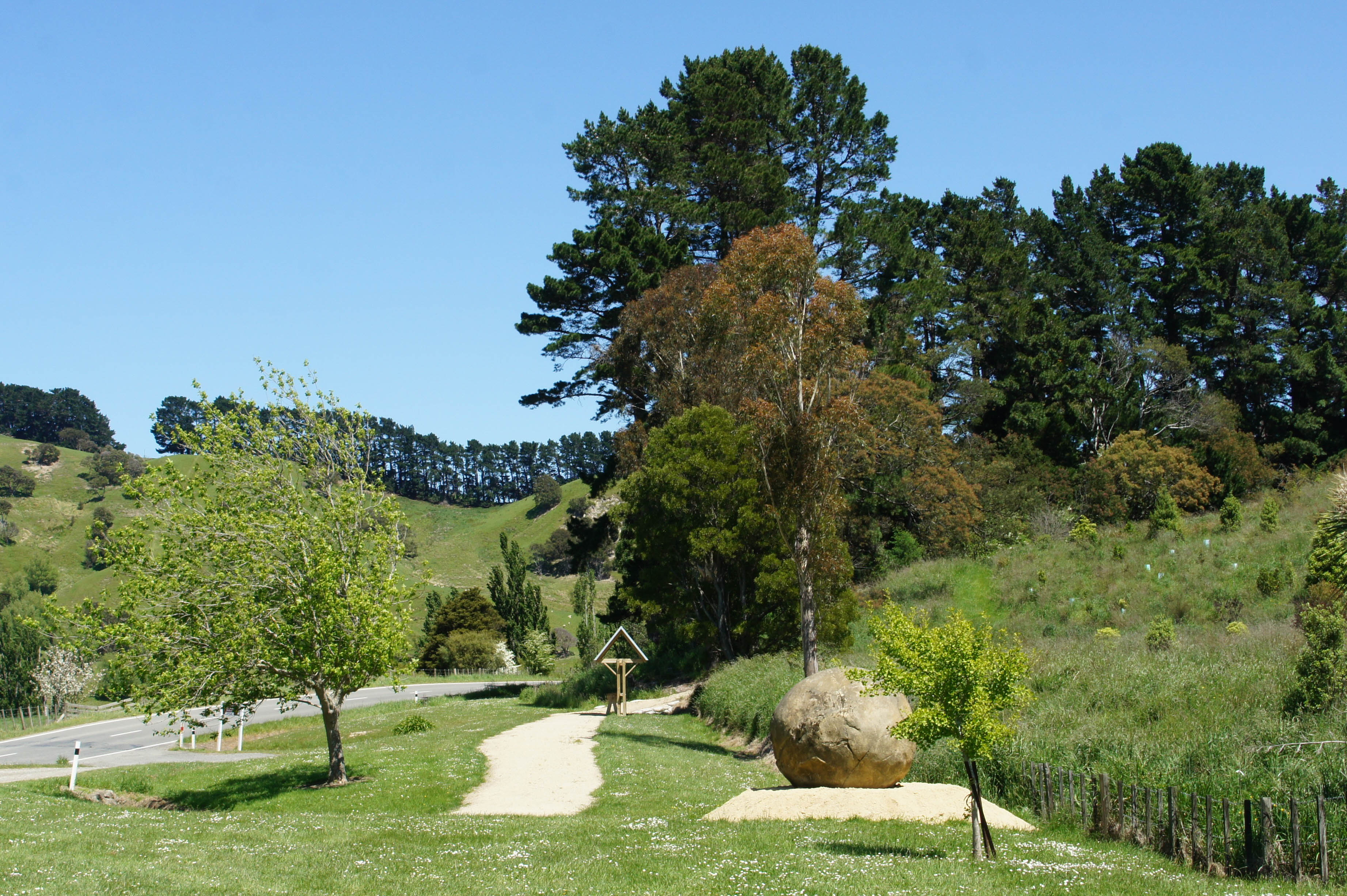
ANZAC walkway

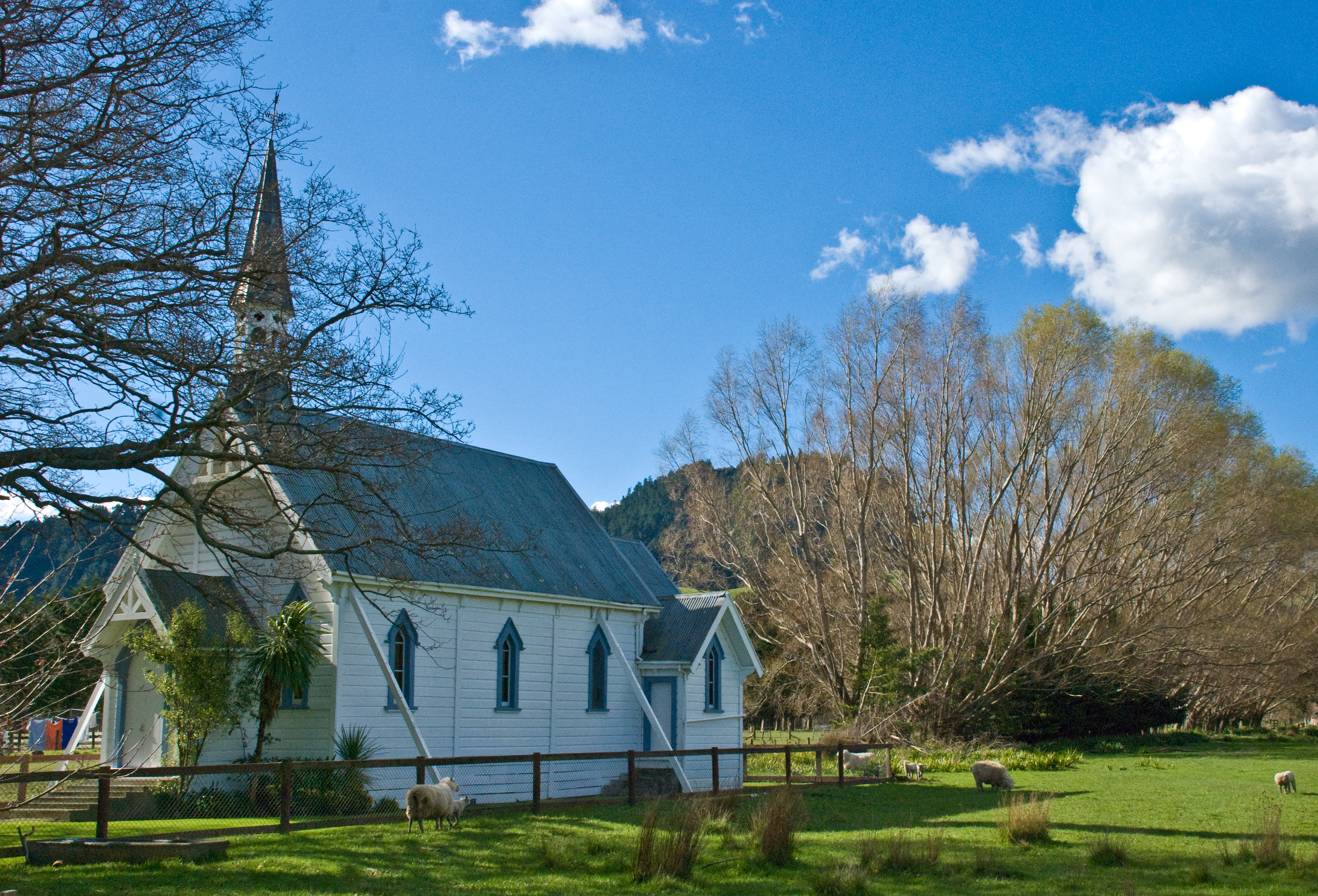
Church of the Good Shepherd

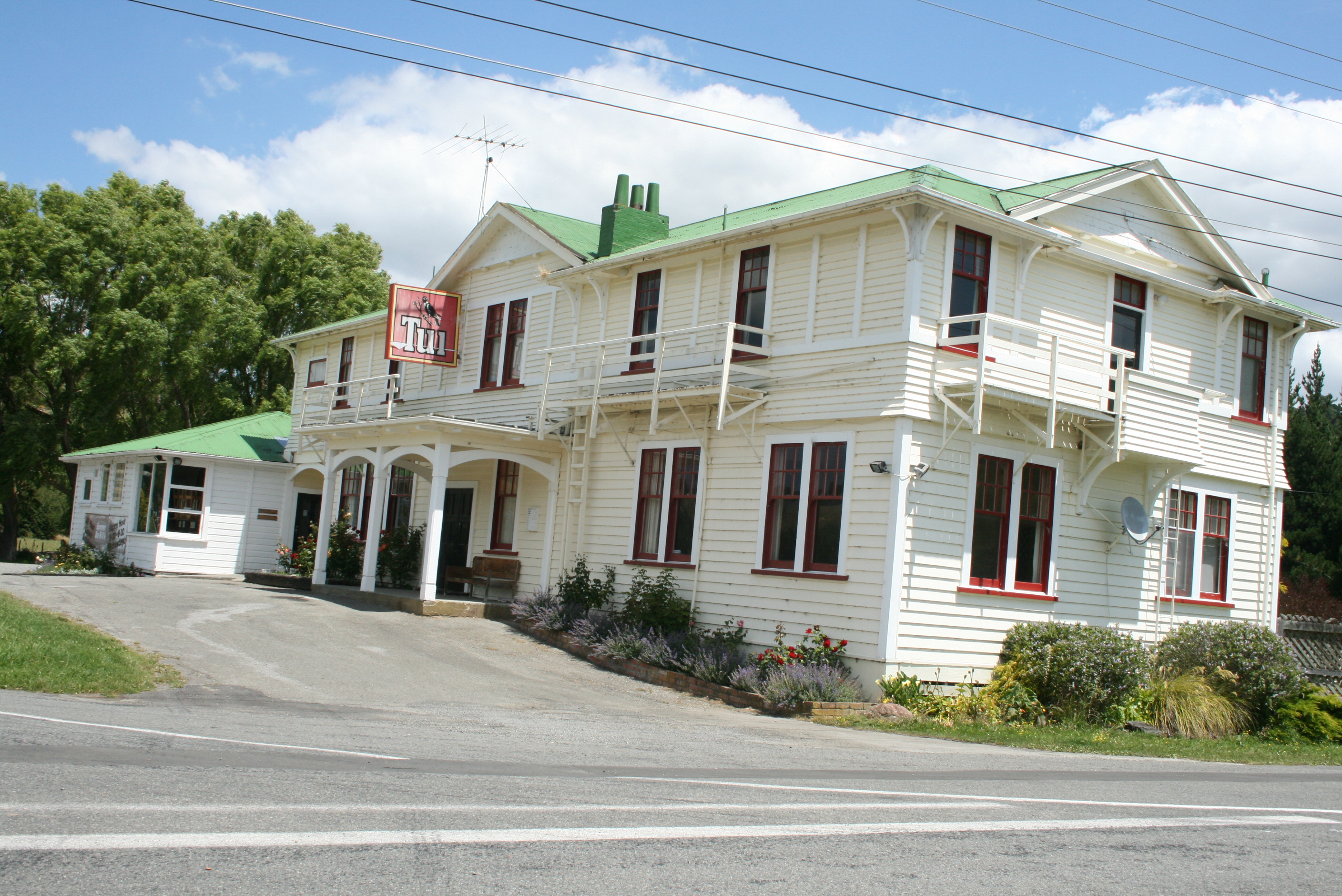
Tīnui Hotel in 2008 before removal to Greytown
