= Waiohine River =

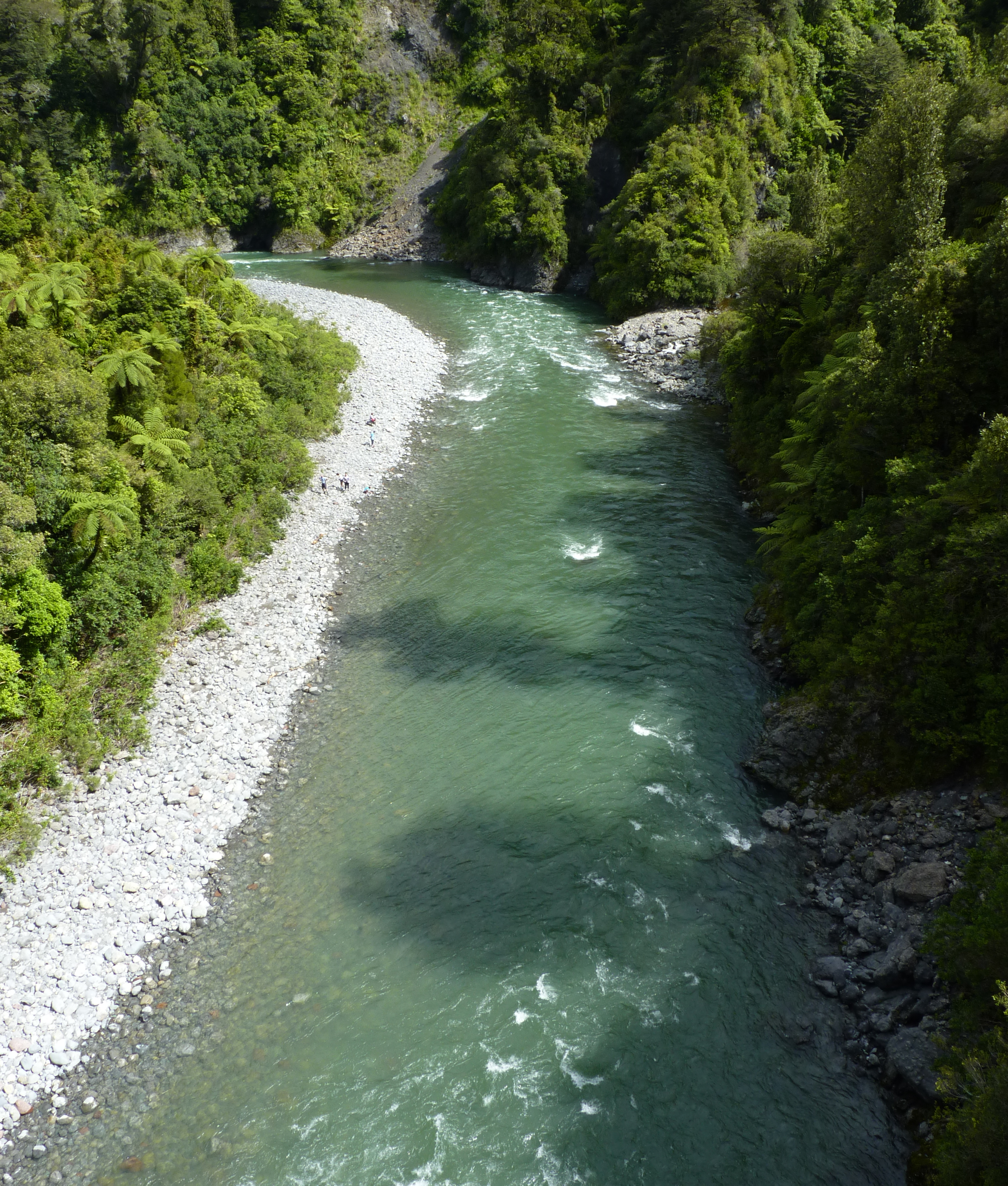
- Waiohine River in Waiohine Gorge
- Route of the Waiohine River
- Mouth of the Waiohine River Waiohine River (North Island)
- Native name: Waiohine (Māori)

Location
- Country: New Zealand
- Island: North Island
- Region: Wellington
- District: Carterton, South Wairarapa

Physical characteristics
- Source: Tarn Ridge, Tararua Range
  - coordinates: 40.97348°S 175.4393°E
  - elevation: 1,500 m (4,920 ft)
- Mouth: Ruamāhanga River
  - location: Pāpāwai
  - coordinates: 41°03′40″S 175°29′54″E
  - elevation: 40 m (130 ft)
- Length: 58 km (36 mi)
- Basin size: 378 km^{2} (146 sq mi)
- Discharge
  - average: 25 m^{3}/s (880 cu ft/s) at Waiohine Gorge

Basin features
- Progression: Waiohine River → Ruamāhanga River → Lake Ōnoke → Lake Ōnoke Outlet → Palliser Bay → Cook Strait → Pacific Ocean
- Cities: Greytown, Ahikōuka
- Tributaries
  - left: Dorset Creek, Angle Knob Creek, Francis Creek, Isabelle Creek, Tōtara Creek, Sayer Creek, Deep Creek, Rocky Stream, Fern Stream, Devil Creek, Mangātarere Stream
  - right: Park River, Crawford Creek, Muir Creek, Maungahuka Stream, Hector River, Makaka Creek, Clem Creek, Coal Stream, Sunny Stream, Muhunoa Stream
- Bridges: Mid Waiohine Hut swing bridge, Waiohine Gorge Suspension Bridge, Wairarapa Line railway bridge, Waiohine Bridge (State Highway 2),

The Waiohine River is a river of the Greater Wellington Region of New Zealand's North Island.

At first it flows generally south from its origins in the Tararua Range west of Ōtaki. It turns south-east once it reaches the plain where it passes to the north of Greytown and flows into the Ruamāhanga River at Pāpāwai. Its main tributary is the Mangātarere Stream.

Some of its water reaches Lake Wairarapa directly through many channels and irrigation features in Greytown's fruit-growing district.

== See also ==
- List of rivers of Wellington Region
- List of rivers of New Zealand
