= Kaihoata River =

- Route of the Kaihoata River
- Mouth of the Kaihoata River Kaihoata River (North Island)
- Native name: Kaihoata (Māori)

Location
- Country: New Zealand
- Island: North Island
- Region: Wellington
- District: Masterton, Carterton

Physical characteristics
- Source
  - coordinates: 41.09168°S 175.93703°E
- Mouth: Pacific Ocean
  - coordinates: 41°11′51″S 175°59′29″E
  - elevation: Sea level
- Length: 22 km (14 mi)

Basin features
- Progression: Kaihoata River → Pacific Ocean
- Tributaries
  - left: Tōtara Stream
  - right: Te Maire Creek, Huakawakawa Stream, Bismark Creek, Kaihoata Iti Stream, Sullivans Creek
- Bridges: Kaiwhata Road Bridge, Kaiwhata Valley Road Bridge

The Kaihoata River, formerly known as the Kaiwhata River, is a river of the southern North Island of New Zealand. It rises in rough hill country to the southeast of Masterton, flowing southeast to reach the Pacific Ocean 12 kilometres (7 mi) south of Riversdale Beach. On 7 March 2023, the name of the river was officially altered from Kaiwhata to Kaihoata, following the enactment of the Ngāti Kahungunu ki Wairarapa Tāmaki nui-a-Rua Claims Settlement Act 2022.

== See also ==
- List of rivers of New Zealand
- List of rivers of Wellington Region
