= Mataikona River =

- Route of the Mataikona River
- Mouth of the Mataikona River Mataikona River (North Island)
- Native name: Mataikona (Māori)

Location
- Country: New Zealand
- Island: North Island
- Region: Wellington
- District: Masterton, Tararua

Physical characteristics
- Source: Mangahoeka
  - coordinates: 40.78583°S 176.19166°E
- Mouth: Pacific Ocean
  - coordinates: 40°46′58″S 176°15′59″E
  - elevation: Sea level
- Length: 26 km (16 mi)

Basin features
- Progression: Mataikona River → Pacific Ocean
- Cities: Mataikona
- Tributaries
  - left: Pakowhai River, Makatote Stream, Waipaua Stream
  - right: Smoky Gully Stream, Smith Creek

The Mataikona River is a river of the Wairarapa of New Zealand's North Island. It flows generally southwest from its sources in rugged hill country 30 kilometres (19 mi) southwest of Pahiatua, flowing to the Pacific Ocean which it reaches 15 kilometres (9 mi) northeast of Castlepoint.

== See also ==
- List of rivers of New Zealand
- List of rivers of Wellington Region
