= Ngatiawa River =

- Route of the Ngatiawa River
- Mouth of the Ngatiawa River Ngatiawa River (North Island)

Location
- Country: New Zealand

Physical characteristics
- Source
  - location: Tararua Range
  - coordinates: 40.95848°S 175.15906°E
- Mouth
  - location: Waikanae River
  - coordinates: 40°53′52″S 175°05′41″E

Basin features
- Progression: Ngatiawa River → Waikanae River → Rauoterangi Channel → South Taranaki Bight → Tasman Sea
- Landmarks: Tararua Forest Park, Reikorangi

The Ngatiawa River is a river on the Kāpiti Coast of New Zealand's North Island that is a major tributary of the Waikanae River. Its headwaters are in the Tararua Range and it flows north and northwest through the Akatarawa Valley to Reikorangi, where it meets the Waikanae River.

A 27-metre-long Howe truss bridge was built across the river in 1912 and 1913. It collapsed in 2017.

== See also ==
- List of rivers of Wellington Region
- List of rivers of New Zealand
