= Kupe's Sail =

Geological formation in New Zealand

Kupe's Sail Māori: Ngā Rā-a-Kupe
- Cliff
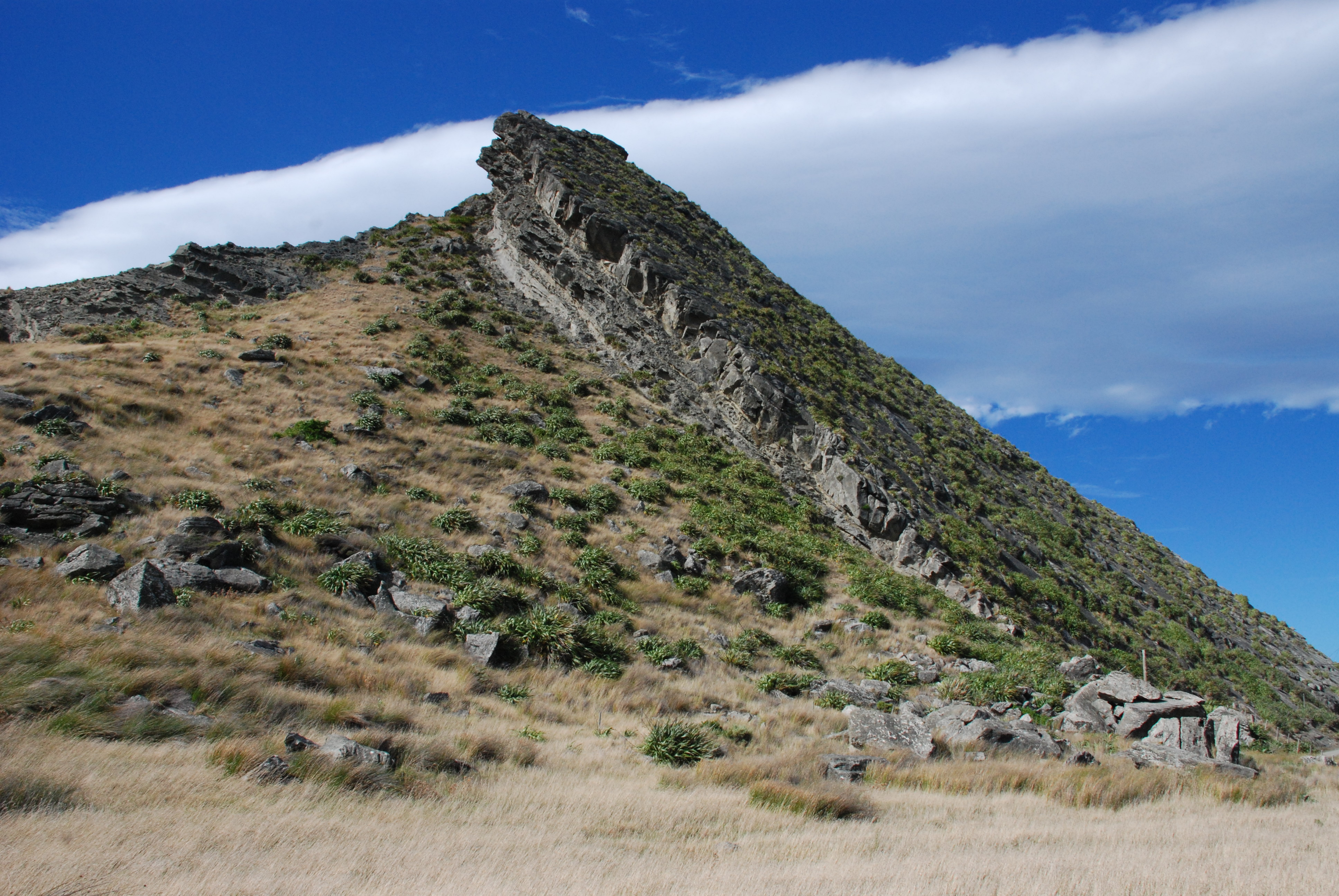
- Kupe's Sail viewed edge-on

- Location within New Zealand
- Coordinates: 41°36′16″S 175°15′58″E
- Location: Cape Palliser / Mātakitaki-a-Kupe
- Formed by: Tectonic uplift
- Etymology: From Māori: The sails of Kupe
- Defining authority: New Zealand Geographic Board

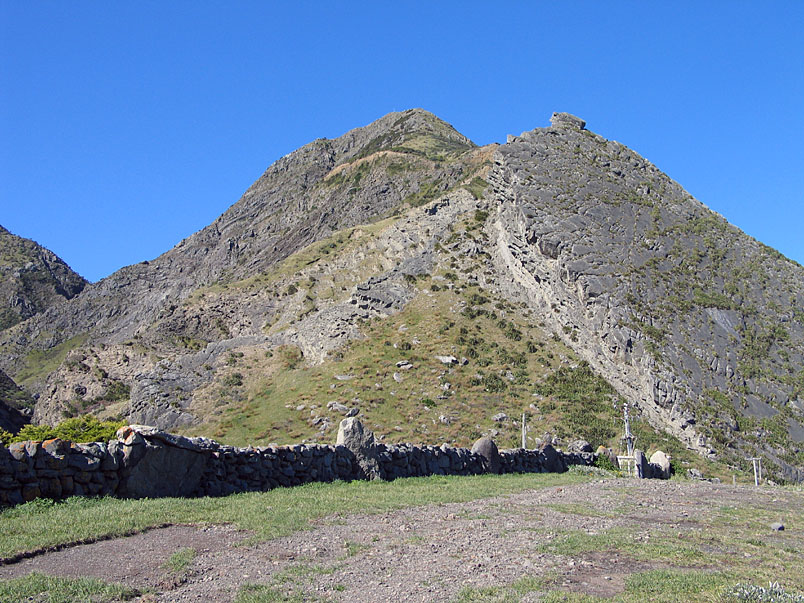
Kupe's Sail

Kupe's Sail (Māori: Ngā Rā-a-Kupe), is a geological formation near the eastern end of Palliser Bay at the southern end of the North Island of New Zealand.

It is composed of sedimentary rock which has been thrust up in an earthquake, resulting in a characteristic flat triangular ridge having the appearance of the kind of sail regularly used by Pacific explorers such as Kupe. According to Māori mythology, the formation is the result of a sail-making competition between Kupe and his companion Ngake. After the sails were made, they were hung out to dry and were said to have formed the rock formation, which was then named after the legend.

On 7 March 2023, the name of the rock formation was officially gazetted as Ngā Rā-a-Kupe, following the enactment of the Ngāti Kahungunu ki Wairarapa Tāmaki nui-a-Rua Claims Settlement Act 2022.

== Sources ==
- 1966 Encyclopedia of New Zealand
- The Great New Zealand Maritime Heritage Trail
