= Pāhaoa River =

- Anthus novaeseelandiae at the Pāhaoa River mouth
- Route of the Pāhaoa River
- Mouth of the Pāhaoa River Pāhaoa River (North Island)
- Native name: Pāhaoa (Māori)

Location
- Country: New Zealand
- Island: North Island
- Region: Wellington
- District: Carterton, South Wairarapa

Physical characteristics
- Source
  - coordinates: 41.24719°S 175.86888°E
- Mouth: Pacific Ocean
  - location: Pāhaoa
  - coordinates: 41°23′45″S 175°43′17″E
  - elevation: Sea level
- Length: 41 km (25 mi)

Basin features
- Progression: Pāhaoa River → Pacific Ocean
- Cities: Pāhaoa
- Tributaries
  - left: Mapapa Stream, Oumukura Stream, Mangaatiko Stream, Makahika Stream, Mangatoi Creek, Waitetuna Stream, Moy Hill Creek, Glendhu Creek
  - right: Andersons Stream, Wainuioru River, Ngakonui Stream, Whaitiri Stream, Kaikaikuri Stream, Cherry Tree Creek, Teneriffe Creek, Orepū Creek
- Bridges: Moeraki Road/Ngakonui Road Bridge, Moeraki Road Bridge, Bridge near 49 Bush Gully Road, Bridge near 51 Bush Gully Road, Glendhu Road Bridge

The Pāhaoa River is a river of the Wairarapa, in the Wellington Region of New Zealand's North Island. It winds through rough hill country to the southwest of Masterton, initially flowing southwest before turning southeast to reach the Pacific Ocean 25 kilometres (16 mi) southeast of Martinborough. The Wainuioru River is a major tributary of the river.

== Etymology ==
The river's name refers to a wind break around cultivations, or to a fortified pā that is beseiged. Prior to 1940, the spelling Pahaua River was used.

== History ==
The river has cultural significance for Ngāti Kahungunu ki Wairarapa. The river mouth area was a place of intensive traditional settlement for Ngāti Kahungunu and earlier iwi of the Wairarapa, including Ngāti Rongomāiaia and Ngāti Hikawera. Pāhaoa at the river's mouth is associated with some traditions of Kupe, as the location where one of his children, Rere-whakaaitu, was left behind. The river was traditionally used as a gateway to the interior forests of the Wairarapa, where tōtara logs were harvested to construct waka.

In 1855, the New Zealand Government set aside a native reserve at Pāhaoa for Ngāti Kahungunu.

== See also ==
- List of rivers of New Zealand
- List of rivers of Wellington Region
