= Park River (New Zealand) =

River in New Zealand

- 1911 view of the Park Valley
- Route of the Park River
- Mouth of the Park River Park River (New Zealand) (North Island)

Location
- Country: New Zealand
- Island: North Island
- Region: Wellington
- District: Carterton

Physical characteristics
- Source: Pukematawai
  - location: Dora Ridge
  - coordinates: 40.7462°S 175.4272°E
- Mouth: Waiohine River
  - location: Park Forks
  - coordinates: 40°48′33″S 175°23′32″E

Basin features
- Progression: Park River → Waiohine River → Ruamāhanga River → Lake Ōnoke → Lake Ōnoke Outlet → Palliser Bay → Cook Strait → Pacific Ocean
- Tributaries
  - left: Thompson Creek

Park River is a river in the Carterton District of New Zealand's North Island. It drains from the southern slopes of Pukematawai in the Tararua Range, flowing south to meet the Waiohine River.

== Geography ==
Flowing from the southern slopes of Pukematawai of the Dora Ridge in the Tararua Range, the river flows through the Park Valley, bounded on the west by the main Tararua Range, and the right by the Carkreek Ridge. The entire length of the river and its whole catchment are inside the Tararua Forest Park. The river flows into the Waiohine River at a location called Park Forks.

The river valley is moraine, formed by glacial action during the Late Pleistocene, likely around 26,000 years ago during the early Last Glacial Maximum, or earlier.
