= Reikorangi =

Locality in New Zealand

- Rural locality
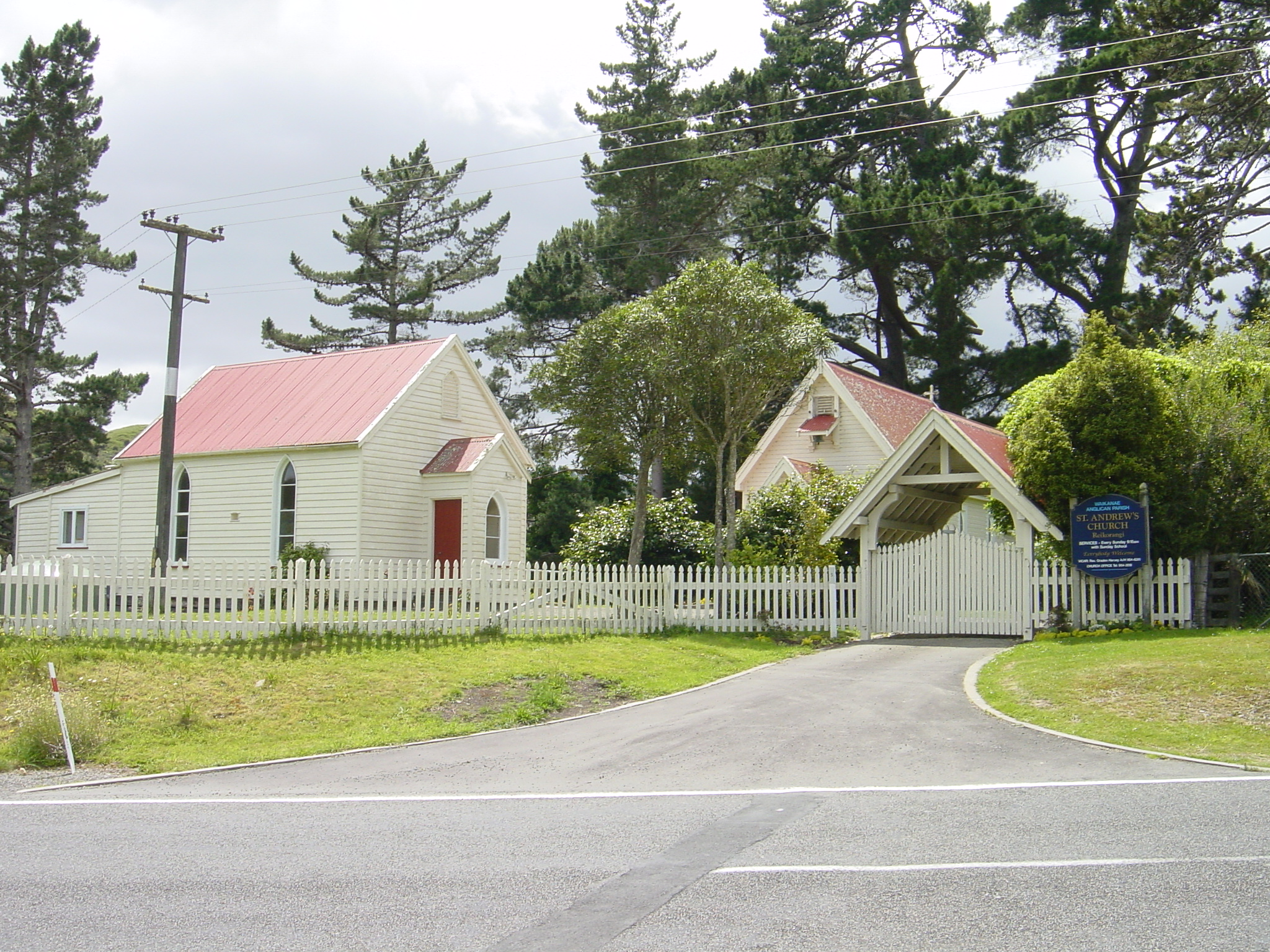
- St. Andrew’s Church
- Interactive map of Reikorangi
- Coordinates: 40°54′S 175°05′E
- Country: New Zealand
- Region: Wellington Region
- Territorial authority: Kāpiti Coast District
- Ward: Paraparaumu Ward; Waikanae Ward
- Community: Waikanae Community
- Electorates: Kapiti; Te Tai Hauāuru (Māori)

Government
  - Territorial Authority: Kāpiti Coast District Council
  - Regional council: Greater Wellington Regional Council
  - Kāpiti Coast Mayor: Janet Holborow
  - Kapiti MP: Tim Costley
  - Te Tai Hauāuru MP: Debbie Ngarewa-Packer

Area
  - Total: 34.72 km^{2} (13.41 sq mi)

Population (2023 census)
  - Total: 459
  - Density: 13.2/km^{2} (34.2/sq mi)
- Postcode(s): 5391
- Area code: 04

Reikorangi is a rural locality on the Kāpiti Coast in New Zealand's North Island. It is inland, behind Waikanae in the Akatarawa Valley of the Tararua Ranges. The Ngatiawa River and Reikorangi Stream both meet the Waikanae River in Reikorangi. Reikorangi contains a church and a monastery, and contained a post office from 1895 to 1962 and a school, which opened in 1895 and closed in 1970 due to the declining population of the small locality.

A historic Howe truss bridge collapsed in 2017.

Attractions include the Reikorangi Pottery Park and Cafe. The national Te Araroa Trail also passes through.

== Demographics ==
Reikorangi locality covers 34.72 km^{2} (13.41 sq mi). It is part of the larger Maungakotukutuku statistical area.

Historical population
Year	Pop.	±% p.a.
2006	381	—
2013	393	+0.44%
2018	426	+1.63%
2023	459	+1.50%

Reikorangi had a population of 459 in the 2023 New Zealand census, an increase of 33 people (7.7%) since the 2018 census, and an increase of 66 people (16.8%) since the 2013 census. There were 243 males and 216 females in 147 dwellings. 3.9% of people identified as LGBTIQ+. There were 81 people (17.6%) aged under 15 years, 84 (18.3%) aged 15 to 29, 228 (49.7%) aged 30 to 64, and 63 (13.7%) aged 65 or older.

People could identify as more than one ethnicity. The results were 79.1% European (Pākehā); 28.1% Māori; 2.6% Pasifika; 3.9% Asian; 0.7% Middle Eastern, Latin American and African New Zealanders (MELAA); and 2.6% other, which includes people giving their ethnicity as "New Zealander". English was spoken by 96.7%, Māori by 9.8%, Samoan by 0.7%, and other languages by 9.2%. No language could be spoken by 1.3% (e.g. too young to talk). The percentage of people born overseas was 22.2, compared with 28.8% nationally.

Religious affiliations were 26.8% Christian, 1.3% Māori religious beliefs, 0.7% Buddhist, 0.7% New Age, and 1.3% other religions. People who answered that they had no religion were 60.8%, and 8.5% of people did not answer the census question.

Of those at least 15 years old, 111 (29.4%) people had a bachelor's or higher degree, 183 (48.4%) had a post-high school certificate or diploma, and 81 (21.4%) people exclusively held high school qualifications. 63 people (16.7%) earned over $100,000 compared to 12.1% nationally. The employment status of those at least 15 was 192 (50.8%) full-time, 66 (17.5%) part-time, and 15 (4.0%) unemployed.
