= Mangātarere Stream =

Stream in New Zealand

- Route of the Mangātarere Stream
- Mouth of the Mangātarere Stream Mangātarere Stream (North Island)
- Native name: Mangātarere (Māori)

Location
- Country: New Zealand
- Island: North Island
- Region: Wellington
- District: Carterton

Physical characteristics
- Source: Tararua Range
  - coordinates: 40.97348°S 175.4393°E
- Mouth: Waiohine River
  - coordinates: 41°03′40″S 175°29′54″E

Basin features
- Progression: Mangātarere Stream → Waiohine River → Ruamāhanga River → Lake Ōnoke → Lake Ōnoke Outlet → Palliser Bay → Cook Strait → Pacific Ocean
- Tributaries
  - left: Carrington Creek, Kiddie Creek
  - right: Enaki Stream, Kaipaitangata Stream, Beef Creek
- Bridges: Tea Creek Road bridge, Mangatarere Valley Road bridge, Belvedere Road bridge, Brooklyn Road bridge, Wairarapa Line railway bridge, Dalefield Road bridge, Mangatarere Stream Bridge (State Highway 2)

Mangātarere Stream is a small gravel-bed stream in central Wairarapa, New Zealand, flowing from the Tararua Ranges to the Waiohine River near Carterton, which joins the Ruamāhanga River southeast of Greytown. The stream provides habitat for native birds, fish, freshwater crayfish, and long-tailed bats, supports a brown trout fishery, and faces ecological pressures from agricultural runoff and township wastewater, with riparian planting used to mitigate impacts.

== Ecology ==
=== Terrestrial fauna ===
The Ruamāhanga catchment supports 79 native bird species, including 29 classified as nationally threatened and 50 as non-threatened. The area includes breeding habitat for black-billed gull (tarapuka), banded dotterel (pohowera) and black fronted dotterel. Regenerating and established native forest and bush remnants in the upper Mangātarere catchment provide habitat for a range of these species. Native lizards have also been recorded, and the area supports long-tail bats (pekapeka), which are classified as Nationally Critical and are vulnerable to predation by possums, mustelids, and feral cats. The upper Mangatārere Stream is the last known long-term site for whio in the region, although whio have not been detected in recent years, a young male was reported in the nearby Waingawa catchment in 2020.

=== Aquatic fauna ===
Eleven species of native freshwater fish and one native decapod species, kōura (freshwater crayfish), have been recorded within the stream's catchment. Four of the fish species (longfin eel, dwarf galaxias, lamprey, and brown mudfish) are classified as threatened by the Department of Conservation. Kōura are also listed as a threatened species.

== Fisheries ==
Mangātarere stream is listed in Greater Wellington's Regional Freshwater Plan as a waterway with important trout habitat. Fish and Game New Zealand identifies the stream as a valuable brown trout spawning and rearing stream in the Wellington region and considers it significant for maintaining the trout fishery of the wider Ruamāhanga catchment.

== Water quality and management ==
Between 2008 and 2010, Greater Wellington Regional Council conducted a Mangātarere Stream Catchment Water Quality Investigation in response to concerns about declining water quality. Surface water sampling undertaken from September 2008 to August 2009 show a decline in water quality downstream toward the Carterton Township, with nutrient concentrations exceeding the Australian and New Zealand Guidelines for aquatic ecosystems (ANZECC guidelines).

The investigation found that the stormwater and wastewater discharge from Carterton, along with nutrient leaching and livestock access associated with dairy and drystock farming, were adversely affecting the stream’s ecological values, including its role as trout habitat and as habitat for threatened native fish species. Riparian planting of native vegetation has been encouraged to reduce nutrient runoff and provide shading to support for aquatic biodiversity.
