= Maungakotukutuku =

Rural locality in Wellington Region, New Zealand

- Rural locality
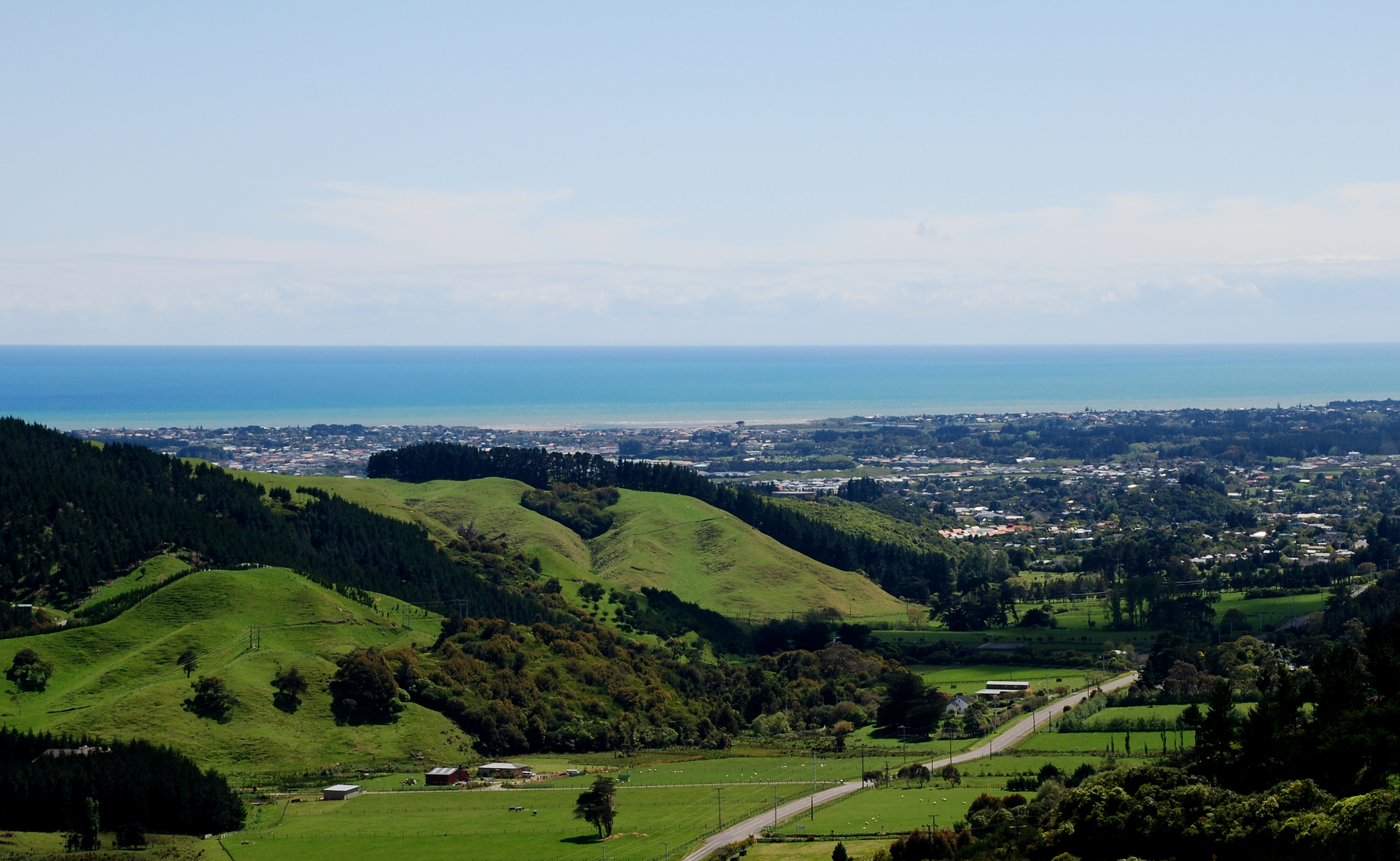
- Paraparaumu from Maungakotukutuku Road
- Interactive map of Maungakotukutuku
- Coordinates: 40°57′S 175°1′E
- Country: New Zealand
- Region: Wellington Region
- Territorial authority: Kāpiti Coast District
- Ward: Paraparaumu Ward; Waikanae Ward
- Community: Paraparaumu Community; Waikanae Community
- Electorates: Kapiti; Te Tai Hauāuru (Māori)

Government
  - Territorial Authority: Kāpiti Coast District Council
  - Regional council: Greater Wellington Regional Council
  - Kāpiti Coast Mayor: Janet Holborow
  - Kapiti MP: Tim Costley
  - Te Tai Hauāuru MP: Debbie Ngarewa-Packer

Area
  - Total: 112.68 km^{2} (43.51 sq mi)

Population (June 2025)
  - Total: 1,450
  - Density: 12.9/km^{2} (33.3/sq mi)
- Postcode(s): 5032, 5391
- Area code: 04

Maungakotukutuku is a rural locality on the Kāpiti Coast of New Zealand's North Island. It is located inland, behind Paraparaumu and Raumati.

The Maungakōtukutuku Stream and Wharemauku Stream both have their headwaters in the Maungakotukutuku area. Maungakotukutuku Valley has been considered as a possible site for a dam to boost the Kāpiti Coast's water supply. The hilly areas, often called "the Maungatooks" by locals, have tracks popular with trampers, mountain and dirt bikers, and horse riders.

== Demographics ==
Maungakotukutuku statistical area covers 112.69 km^{2} (43.51 sq mi). It had an estimated population of 1,450 as of June 2025, with a population density of 13 people per km^{2}.

Historical population
Year	Pop.	±% p.a.
2006	1,044	—
2013	1,212	+2.15%
2018	1,335	+1.95%
2023	1,416	+1.19%

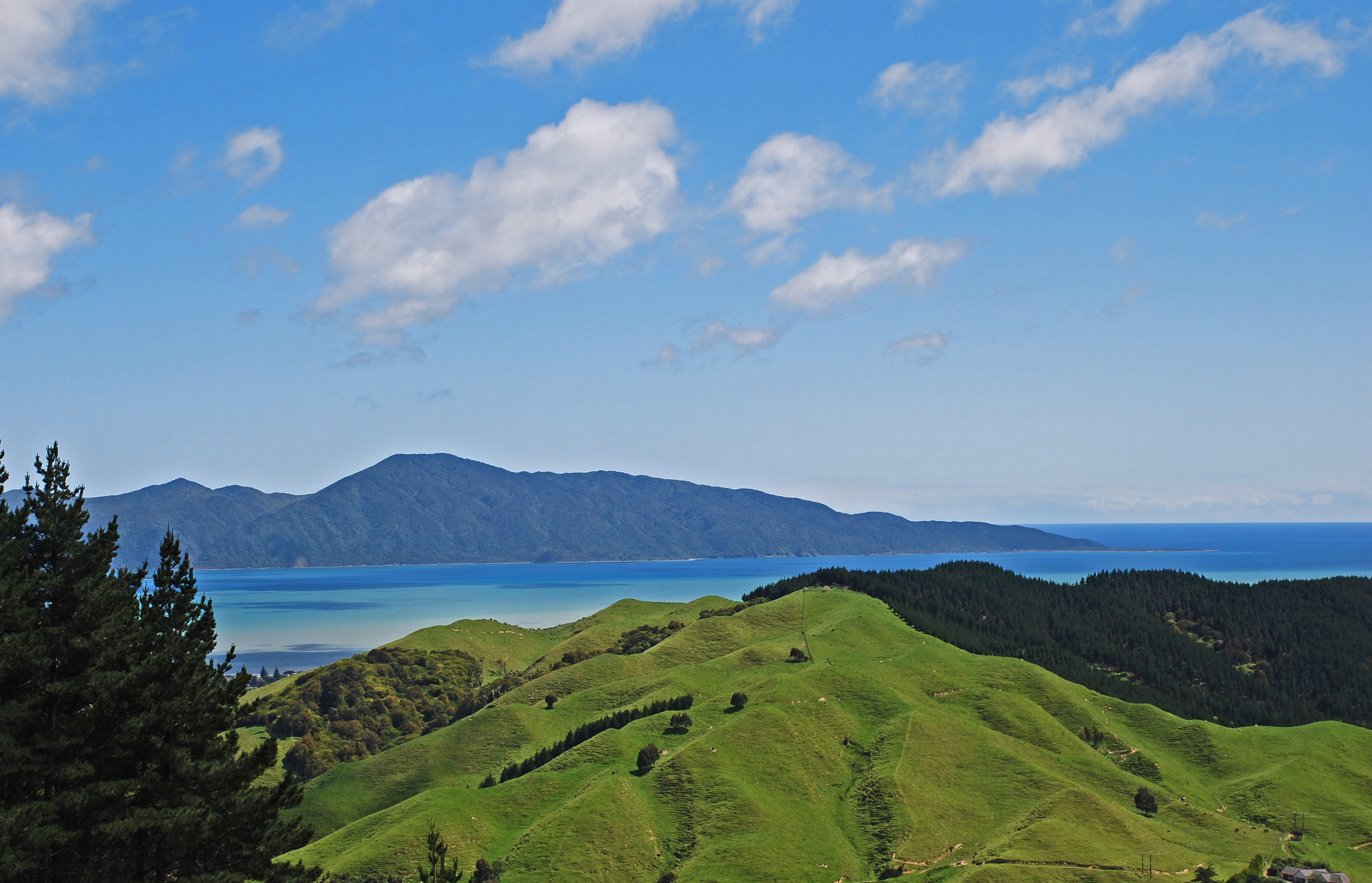
Kapiti Island from the Maungakotukutuku Saddle

Maungakotukutuku had a population of 1,416 in the 2023 New Zealand census, an increase of 81 people (6.1%) since the 2018 census, and an increase of 204 people (16.8%) since the 2013 census. There were 747 males, 663 females, and 6 people of other genders in 543 dwellings. 3.0% of people identified as LGBTIQ+. The median age was 52.5 years (compared with 38.1 years nationally). There were 189 people (13.3%) aged under 15 years, 168 (11.9%) aged 15 to 29, 747 (52.8%) aged 30 to 64, and 312 (22.0%) aged 65 or older.

People could identify as more than one ethnicity. The results were 91.1% European (Pākehā); 8.7% Māori; 2.8% Pasifika; 4.9% Asian; 1.1% Middle Eastern, Latin American and African New Zealanders (MELAA); and 2.5% other, which includes people giving their ethnicity as "New Zealander". English was spoken by 98.7%, Māori by 2.1%, Samoan by 0.6%, and other languages by 10.8%. No language could be spoken by 0.6% (e.g. too young to talk). New Zealand Sign Language was known by 0.4%. The percentage of people born overseas was 29.0, compared with 28.8% nationally.

Religious affiliations were 27.8% Christian, 0.6% Hindu, 0.2% Māori religious beliefs, 0.8% Buddhist, 0.6% New Age, 0.2% Jewish, and 0.6% other religions. People who answered that they had no religion were 60.2%, and 8.9% of people did not answer the census question.

Of those at least 15 years old, 402 (32.8%) people had a bachelor's or higher degree, 612 (49.9%) had a post-high school certificate or diploma, and 216 (17.6%) people exclusively held high school qualifications. The median income was $44,400, compared with $41,500 nationally. 282 people (23.0%) earned over $100,000 compared to 12.1% nationally. The employment status of those at least 15 was 615 (50.1%) full-time, 219 (17.8%) part-time, and 24 (2.0%) unemployed.
