= Cape Palliser =

Promontory on New Zealand's North Island

- Cape
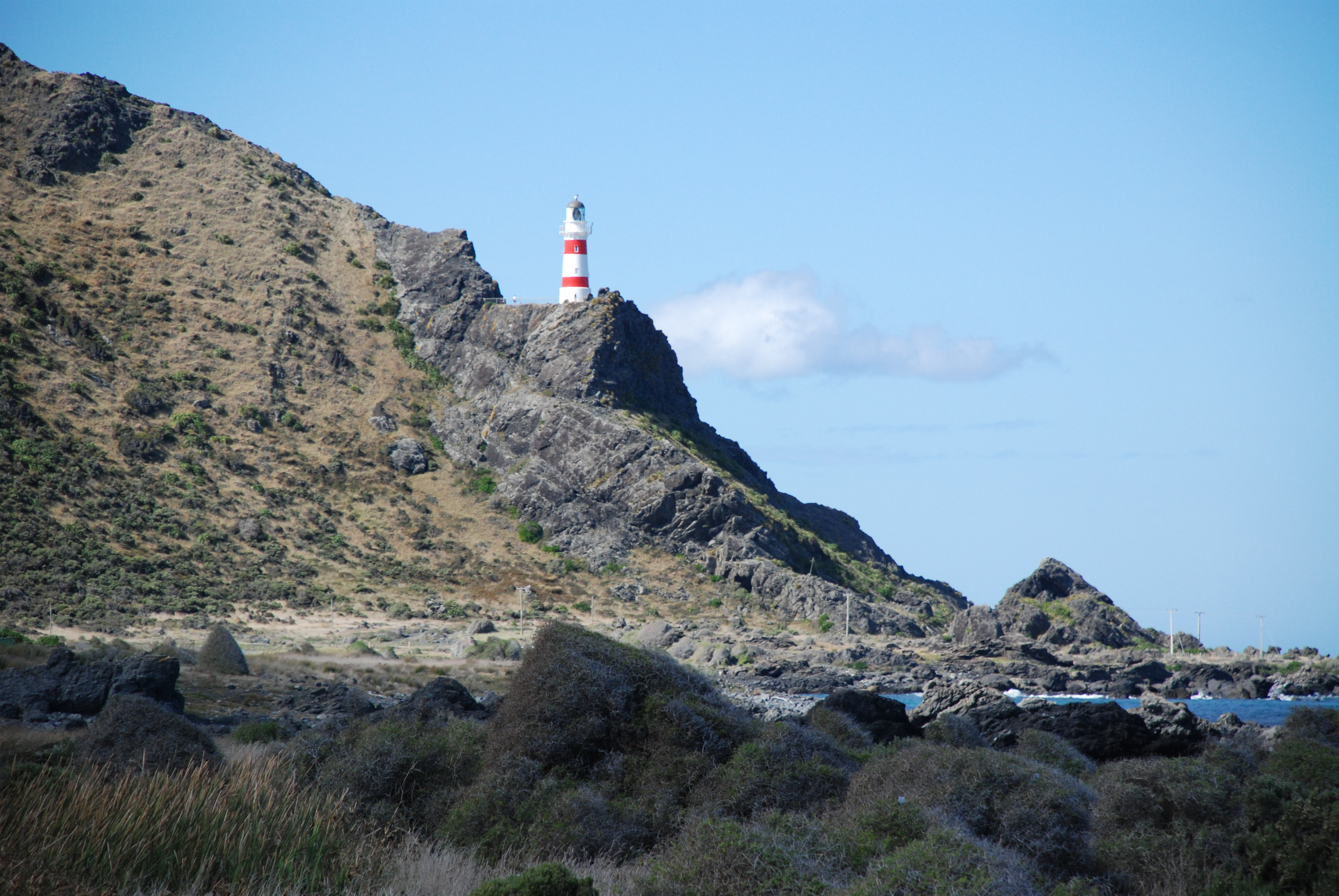
- Cape Palliser and Lighthouse

- Location within New Zealand
- Coordinates: 41.612°S 175.273°E
- Water bodies: South Pacific Ocean

Cape Palliser is a promontory on the southern coast of New Zealand's North Island and is the southernmost point of the North Island; it is in fact considerably farther south than Nelson or Blenheim in the South Island.

== Geography ==
It is located at the eastern end of Palliser Bay in the Wairarapa region, 50 kilometres southeast of Wellington – 100 kilometres by road. A small settlement, Ngawi, is situated near Cape Palliser, where the main income comes from crayfish (southern rock lobster) fishing. Fishing boats are pushed into the sea on their trailers by bulldozers. Ngā Rā-a-Kupe, previously known as Kupe's Sail, is a nearby triangular upthrust of sedimentary rock shaped like a sail. Māori history and the Kupe legend both feature Cape Palliser. Cape Palliser was named in 1770 by Captain James Cook in honour of his friend Admiral Sir Hugh Palliser of the British Royal Navy. On 7 March 2023, the name of the cape was officially gazetted as Cape Palliser / Mātakitaki-a-Kupe, following the enactment of the Ngāti Kahungunu ki Wairarapa Tāmaki nui-a-Rua Claims Settlement Act 2022. The Māori-language portion of the name refers to Kupe gazing out to sea from the location. The Cape Palliser Lighthouse is located here; it was first lit in 1897 but became automated in 1986. It flashes twice every 20 seconds.

== Biodiversity ==
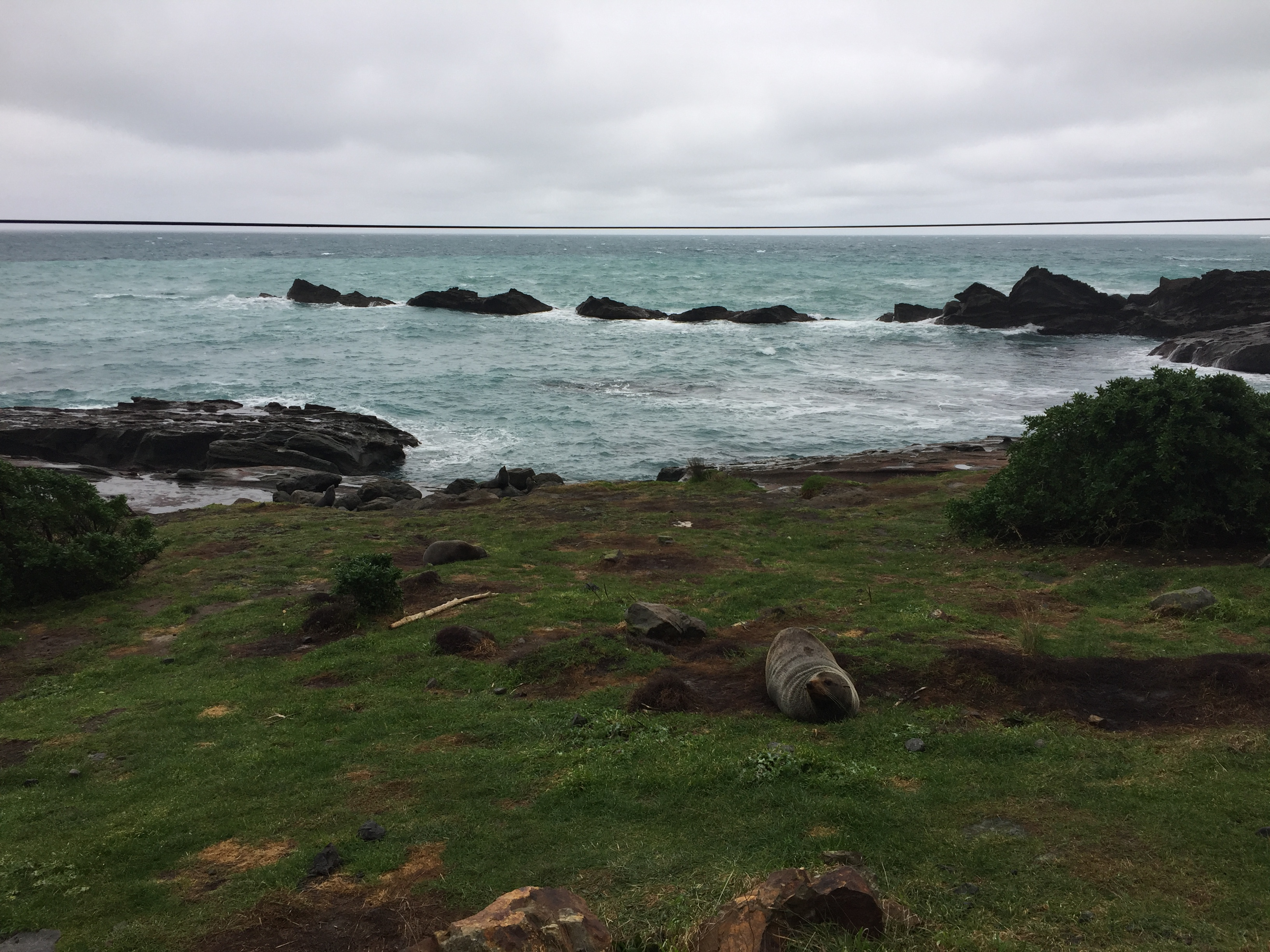
Seal at Cape Palliser

Cape Palliser is home to a permanent fur seal colony. The rookery was found there in 1991, the first one found in the North Island in the 20th century, indicating that the seals are recovering from previous exploitation.

Cape Palliser is also a breeding site for red-billed gulls. This species has the conservation status of "Nationally at risk" and is "Regionally Vulnerable" in the Wellington region.
