= Aorangi Range =

Mountain range on the North Island of New Zealand

- Haurangi Range
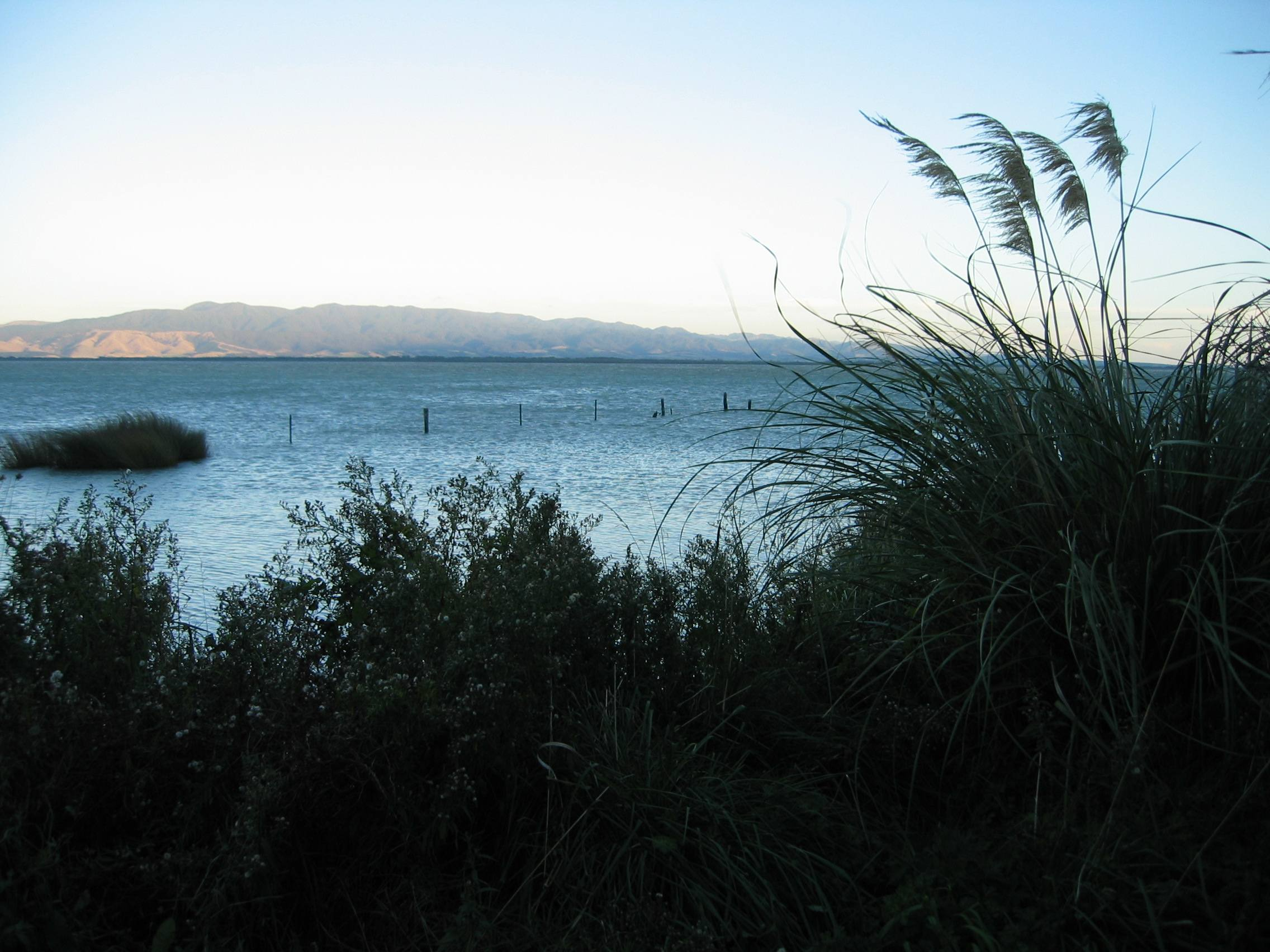
- Aorangi Range and Lake Wairarapa

Highest point
- Peak: Hikapu / Mount Ross
- Elevation: 983 m (3,225 ft)
- Coordinates: 41.459°S 175.347°E

Geography
- Location within New Zealand
- Country: New Zealand

The Aorangi Range (previously known as the Haurangi Range) is a mountain range on the North Island of New Zealand. It is located in the Wairarapa region, extending more than 20 km (12 mi) north from Cape Palliser, and is the southernmost mountain range on the island. The greater portion of these mountains are covered in native forest which is protected and set aside for public recreational use as part of the Aorangi Forest Park.

The Pūtangirua Pinnacles are located near the western edge of the ranges.

== Hikapu Mount Ross ==
Hikapu Mount Ross 983 metres (3,225 ft) is the highest point in the Aorangi Range.
