= Richard Barton (disambiguation) =

Richard Barton (1790–1866) was the first European resident of Trentham, Upper Hutt, in New Zealand.

Richard Barton may also refer to:

- Richard John Barton (1879–1931), New Zealand runholder, pastoralist and author
- Rich Barton (born 1967), American internet entrepreneur
- Richard W. Barton (1800–1859), Virginia politician and lawyer
- Richard Bradshaigh (1601–1669), a.k.a. Richard Barton, Jesuit
- Dick Barton, BBC radio programme between 1946 and 1951
- Dick Barton (boxer) (1911–1990), South African boxer

== See also ==
- Rick Barton (disambiguation)
