= Matt Te Pou =

Matt Te Pou may refer to:

- Matt Te Pou (rugby union player)
- Matt Te Pou (rugby union coach)
