= 1987 New Zealand bravery awards =

The 1987 New Zealand bravery awards were announced via a Special Honours List on 27 August 1987, and recognised ten people for acts of bravery between 1984 and 1986.

== George Medal (GM) ==
- Robin Jamieson Dudding (deceased) – traffic officer, Ministry of Transport, Rotorua.

On 7 April 1986 Traffic Officer Robin Dudding was on duty at Moose Lodge, near Rotorua, to ensure free passage for the Prime Minister of Singapore's motorcade when it left the Lodge for Rotorua. He waved down an oncoming truck and when it stopped a youth armed with a shotgun stepped out. The offender, who had held up a store in Rotoiti and commandeered several vehicles, forced Traffic Officer Dudding into his Ministry of Transport vehicle and then fired two shots at a Police constable also on duty at Moose Lodge. The two set off for Rotorua, Traffic Officer Dudding driving and the offender in the back seat. Almost certainly Traffic Officer Dudding made for Lake Rotorua in an attempt to buy time and to prevent the offender from reaching Rotorua. He stopped at the lake and was shot. Before being shot Traffic Officer Dudding had attempted to disarm the offender. Traffic Officer Dudding displayed outstanding bravery.

== Queen's Gallantry Medal (QGM) ==
- Stephen Anthony Linney – constable, New Zealand Police.

In the early evening of 22 June 1985 while part of a mobile and foot patrol in the area of Port Levy, Banks Peninsula, Constable Linney confronted a young man who it was believed had 2 days earlier been responsible for an armed robbery. The Constable attempted to detain the man but a violent struggle resulted. During the struggle the man pointed a rifle at the Constable and indicated that he was not going to surrender and that it was between the two of them. After verbal attempts to persuade the man to release his weapon, the struggle continued and despite being near exhaustion, the Constable managed to disarm the man and shoot him in the thigh with his .38 revolver. This however did not deter the man who, further enraged, picked up a large piece of driftwood and proceeded to attack the Constable's head. The struggle continued until the Constable managed with some difficulty to apply handcuffs and secure the man. The offender, armed with a knife and .22 rifle and ammunition, clearly had no intention of surrendering and in effecting this arrest Constable Linney disregarded his own safety and demonstrated an exemplary act of bravery.

- Peter Thomas Button OBE – pilot, Capital Helicopters Ltd.

On the morning of 2 July 1986 the New Zealand Police Launch "Lady Elizabeth II", with four Police officers on board, sank at the entrance to Wellington Harbour. The weather conditions were atrocious at the scene with 10 metre high waves and dangerously high winds of up to 65 knots recorded, accompanIed by rain and at times hail. Despite being advised that weather conditions made flying dangerous, Mr Button, accompanied by his son, flew to the scene. Two survivors were located in the water and winched into the helicopter and flown to safety. He returned to the scene by himself and after several attempts uplifted a body with the aid of a scoop net. The body of the fourth person was not found. The two survivors would have perished within a very short time had it not been for Mr Button's outstanding flying skills and courage in placing his own life at risk.

== Queen's Commendation for Brave Conduct ==
- Katherine Agnes Burrell – prison nurse, Department of Justice, Wellington.

For services on the evening of 6 November 1984 at Arohata Youth Institution, when a fire broke out in a cell occupied by a person being held in custody on remand. On unlocking the cell Nurse Burrell was driven back by smoke but with determination she entered the cell and searched for the occupant, who was found unconscious. She dragged her clear of the cell and resuscitated her. Nurse Burrell's prompt action undoubtedly saved the occupant's life.

- Joseph Kauika – of Taihape.

For services on 9 May 1985 when with complete disregard for his own safety, he went to the assistance of an elderly farmer who was bemg gored, tossed and trampled by a massive Hereford Bull. Mr Kauika met the maddened bull head on, jammed his fingers up the bull's nose and with the other hand seized one ofhis horns and threw the animal onto its back. His actions undoubtedly saved the farmer's life.

- Clive Alan Button – of Wellington.

For services on 2 July 1986 when he assisted his father, Mr Peter Button, of Capital Helicopters Ltd., in the rescue of two survivors of the N.Z. Police Launch "Lady Elizabeth II", which had sunk in atrocIous weather at the entrance to Wellington Harbour. He played a crucial role in assisting the two survivors being winched into the helicopter.

- Sapper Alan Leslie McAlley (deceased) – Corps of Royal New Zealand Engineers, 1st Field Squadron Sappers' Brigade, Papakura Camp.

For services on 30 July 1985 when he went to the assistance of two women whose car had struck a concrete median wall, overturned and burst into flames on the Southern Motorway near Mount Wellington, Auckland. He directed two colleagues to play a fire extinguisher onto the burning car and with total disregard to his own safety proceeded to successfully rescue one of the trapped women. The second woman was rescued by other motorists. His initiative at the scene of the accident was responsible for saving the lives of the two women. (Sapper McAlley was himself killed in a motor vehicle accident on 2 June 1987.)

- Wayne Michael Hunt – traffic officer, Ministry of Transport, Tokoroa.

On 8 July 1986, Traffic Officer Hunt, while off duty, went to the assistance of an English family, touring New Zealand, whose campervan had a puncture on State Highway One near Tokoroa. While the tyre was being changed by Traffic Officer Hunt, the family's 7-year-old daughter, who had a hearing problem, wandered onto the highway and into the path of two heavy motor vehicles approaching from opposite directions. Prevented from running straight across the road by one of the oncoming trucks, Traffic Officer Hunt ran onto the road and grabbed the child, turned around and ran back to the campervan. The second truck passed perilously close to the campervan and Traffic Officer Hunt had to shield the child with his body as he clung to the wheel-arch of the van to avoid being blown over by the wind pressure created by the passing vehicle. Traffic Officer Hunt's prompt action saved the life of the child.

- Private Dean Harry Emerson – Royal New Zealand Infantry Regiment.

On 13 July 1986, a group of soldiers from D Company 2/1 RNZIR were swimming off a reef opposite Rarotonga Airport in the Cook Islands. One of the soldiers was caught by a strong offshore current and large swells. Unable to swim to shore he soon became exhausted and was being carried further out to sea. Private Emerson, who was standing on the reef, realised the soldier's predicament and immediately swam out to assist him. He kept the soldier afloat and then, swimming against the current and swells for over 15 minutes, assisted him to safety of the shore.

== Queen's Commendation for Valuable Service in the Air ==
- Derek Walter Lowe – of Murupara.

On 20 October 1984 Mr Lowe, a commercial pilot, while acting as a radio operator on a Cessna 206, intercepted a mayday call from the pilot of another aircraft which had gone into a spin while in cloud over the Taupō area. Mr Lowe slowly but authoritatively transmitted the spin recovery procedure to the pilot in distress, enabling the pilot to recover from the perilous situation and thereby saving the lives of the pilot and the two passengers.
