= 1982 Birthday Honours (New Zealand) =

Awards list for New Zealand

The 1982 Queen's Birthday Honours in New Zealand, celebrating the official birthday of Elizabeth II, were appointments made by the Queen in her right as Queen of New Zealand, on the advice of the New Zealand government, to various orders and honours to reward and highlight good works by New Zealanders. They were announced on 12 June 1982.

The recipients of honours are displayed here as they were styled before their new honour.

== Knight Bachelor ==
- George Alan Chapman – of Heretaunga. For political and public services.
- Laurie Justice Francis – of Dunedin; New Zealand High Commissioner to Australia.
- Hamish Grenfell Hay – of Christchurch; mayor of the City of Christchurch.
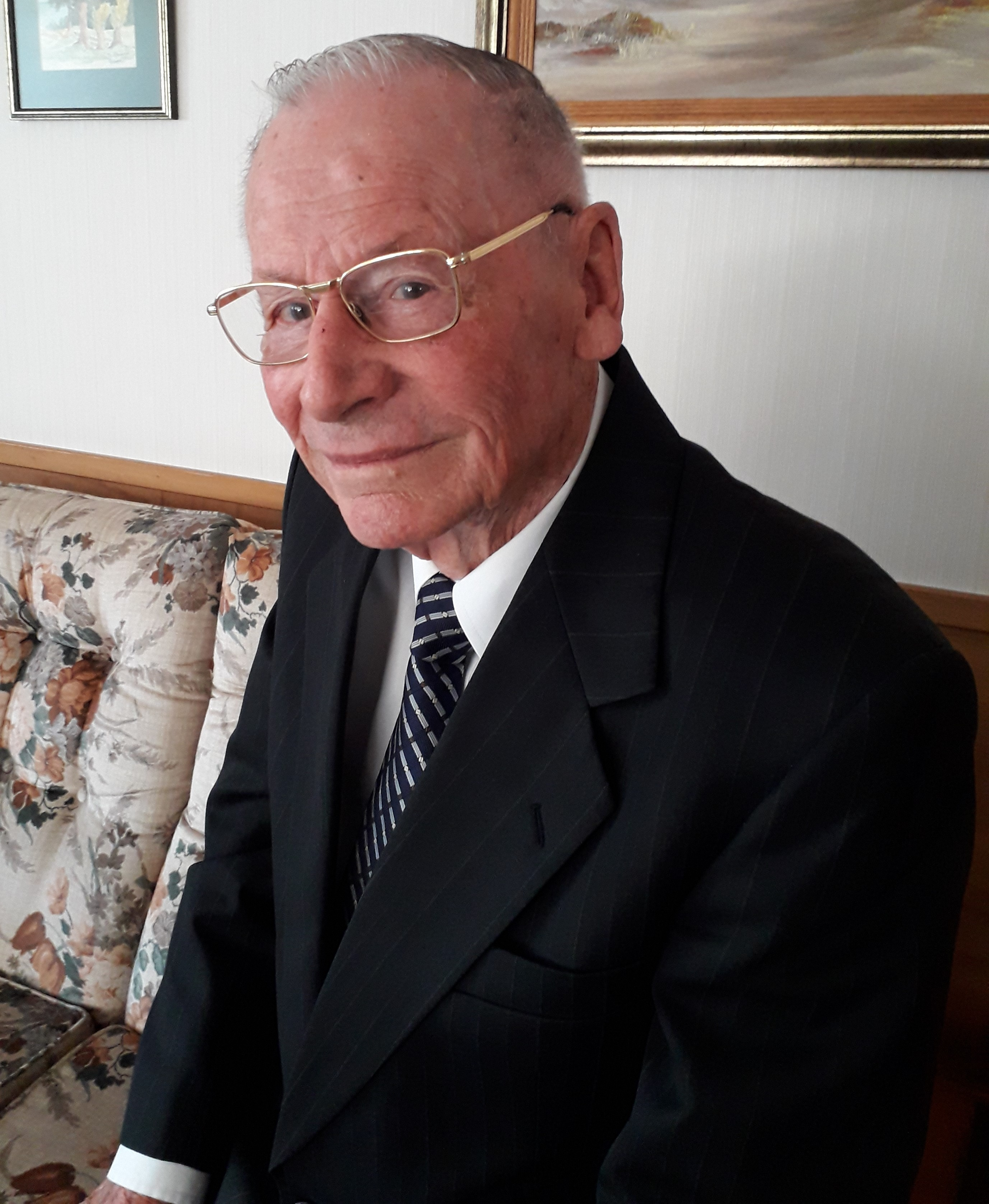
Sir George Chapman

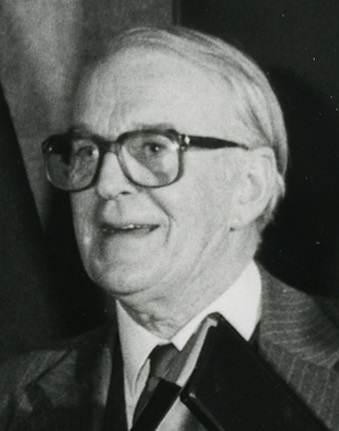
Sir Laurie Francis

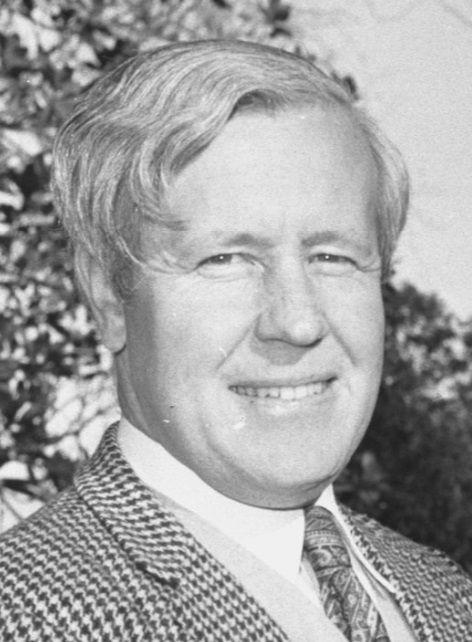
Sir Hamish Hay

== Order of Saint Michael and Saint George ==
=== Companion (CMG) ===
- Kenneth Walter Kiddle – of Havelock North; chairman, New Zealand Apple and Pear Marketing Board.
- Raymond Walter Ralph White – of Silverstream; lately governor of the Reserve Bank of New Zealand.

== Order of the British Empire ==
=== Dame Commander (DBE) ===
Civil division

- Kiri Janette Te Kanawa (Mrs Park) OBE – of Surrey, England. For services to opera.
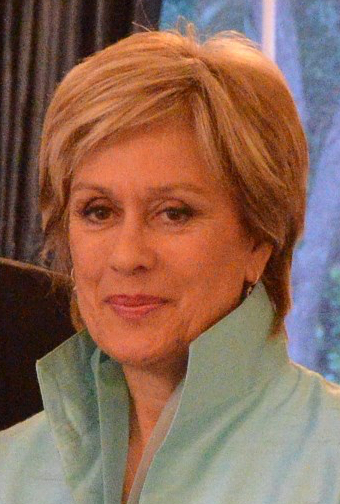
Dame Kiri Te Kanawa

=== Knight Commander (KBE) ===
Military division

- Vice Admiral Neil Dudley Anderson CB CBE – Chief of Defence Staff.

=== Commander (CBE) ===
Civil division

- Professor Alan Joseph Alldred – of Invercargill. For services to orthopaedic surgery.
- Emeritus Professor Kenneth Brailey Cumberland – of Auckland. For services to geography and the community.
- Charles John Dempsey – of Auckland. For services to association football.
- John Fraser Robertson – of Lower Hutt; Secretary for Justice.

Military division

- Brigadier John Webster Mawson MVO – Brigadiers' List, New Zealand Army.

=== Officer (OBE) ===
Civil division

- Beville Robert Austin JP – of Palmerston North. For services to the community.
- Henry John Lester Bailey – of Timaru. For services to the community.
- Lindsay John MacFarlarie Black – of Greymouth; lately specialist orthopaedic surgeon, West Coast Hospital Board.
- David Alan Bowron – of Christchurch. For services to manufacturing and the community.
- Peter Thomas Button – of Wellington. For services to search and rescue operations.
- Walter Robertson Fleming – deputy assistant commissioner, New Zealand Police.
- Haydn Neil Guymer – of Surrey, England. For services to export.
- John Hildebrand Holderness – of Havelock North. For services to scouting and the community.
- Dr Norcott de Bisson Hornibrook FRSNZ – of Lower Hutt; chief micropalaeontologist, New Zealand Geological Survey, Department of Scientific and Industrial Research, 1951–1981.
- Hugh Milson Linklater – of Palmerston North. For services to farming and the community.
- Elizabeth Hazel Lissaman (Mrs Hall) – of Morrinsville. For services to pottery.
- Alan William Mackney – of Auckland. For services to forestry and the community.
- Peter Heywood Malone – of Nelson. For services to the veterinary profession.
- Gordon Charles Mason JP – of Warkworth. For services to local government.
- Onny Parun – of Wellington. For services to tennis.
- John Charles Paterson – of Christchurch. For services to agriculture.
- Dr Lancelot Eric Richdale FRSNZ – of Auckland. For services to ornithology.
- Clementina Smeeton – of Auckland. For services to returned servicewomen, nursing and the community.
- Lagitafuke Haioti Viliko – of Auckland. For services to the people of Niue.
- George Frederick Vincent – of Wellington. For services to badminton and softball.

Military division

- Captain Kelvin John Lewis – Royal New Zealand Navy.
- Lieutenant Colonel John Alexander Dixon – Royal New Zealand Infantry Regiment.
- Group Captain Albert Edward Thomson AFC – Royal New Zealand Air Force.
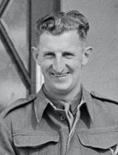
Gordon Mason

=== Member (MBE) ===
Civil division

- Oliver Richard Arkell – of Auckland. For services to the community.
- Sylvia Ashton-Warner – of Otūmoetai. For services to education and literature.
- Ian Nelson Drummond – of Motueka. For services to returned servicemen and the community.
- Peter Glen – of Lower Hutt. For services to the New Zealand Symphony Orchestra.
- Dorothy Helen Hamilton – of Wellington. For services as a dental nurse and to the community.
- George Sinclair Hanson – of Ontario, Canada; president, New Zealand Lamb Company Ltd. For services to export.
- John David Monroe Herron – of Dunedin; lately rector, Bayfield High School, Dunedin.
- Robin Cromwell Holst – of Auckland. For services to music.
- George Leslie Victor Hunter – of Auckland. For services to the taxi industry.
- Arthur Russell Kerse – of Tawa. For services to the New Zealand Crippled Children Society.
- Clive Kingsley-Smith – of Whakatāne. For services to the community.
- Alan Julian La Roche – of Auckland. For services to the community.
- Keith Reginald Leckie – of Dunedin. For services to swimming.
- Richard Norman Lyon – of Auckland; superintendent, Armament Stores Depot and Inspector of Naval Ordnance, Auckland.
- Albert Bernard Macdonald – of Gisborne. For services to the community.
- Kathleen Isobel McRoberts – of Auckland. For services to music.
- Anna Marie Millar – of Whangārei. For services to the Māori people.
- Stewart Rutherford Morrison – of Auckland. For services to adult education and the arts.
- Naomi Oakly – of Masterton. For services to the community.
- Cyril Pascoe Perry JP – of Aria. For services to the Sheep Dog Trial Association.
- Alan Kirkland Prince JP – of Whakatāne. For services to the community.
- Jack Ranfurly Arthur Onslow Rogers – of Hamilton. For services to the community.
- Blair Goldesborough Stockwell – of Christchurch. For services to cycling.
- Rodney George Sutton – of Invercargill. For services to music.

Military division

- Warrant Officer Seaman Gunnery Instructor Kenneth Johnston – Royal New Zealand Navy.
- Warrant Officer Marine Engineering Artificer Noel William White – Royal New Zealand Navy.
- Major Ian Moorcroft Bolton ED – Royal New Zealand Armoured Corps (Territorial Force).
- Major Christopher Bernard Mullane – Royal New Zealand Infantry Regiment.
- Major and Quartermaster Robert Percy Withers – Royal New Zealand Infantry Regiment.
- Flight Lieutenant Graham Hugo Page Hanify – Royal New Zealand Air Force.
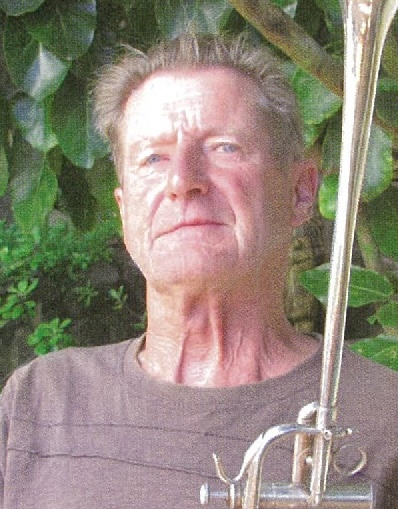
Graham Hanify

== British Empire Medal (BEM) ==
Military division

- Chief Petty Officer Marine Engineering Artificer Graeme Robert Cramond – Royal New Zealand Navy.
- Sergeant Henare Taurima Baker – Royal New Zealand Corps of Transport (Territorial Force).
- Staff Sergeant Matthew John Te Pou – Royal New Zealand Artillery.
- Sergeant Stephen James Tesar – Royal New Zealand Infantry Regiment.
- Staff Sergeant (now Warrant Officer Class II) Bevan Douglas Wright – Royal New Zealand Infantry Regiment (Territorial Force).
- Flight Sergeant Russell Gibson Bodman – Royal New Zealand Air Force.

== Companion of the Queen's Service Order (QSO) ==
=== For community service ===
- James Edward Brunton – of Dunedin.
- Riki te Mairaki Ellison-Taiaroa JP – of Christchurch.
- Donald Macfarlane Purves Hay – of Wellington.
- Neil Isaac JP – of Christchurch.
- Mina Annie Kerr – of Wellington.
- Margaret Laurence Salas – of Wellington.

=== For public services ===
- Robert Agnew – of Blenheim.
- Jack Brand – of Ashburton.
- Mavis Amy Campbell – of Kaikohe.
- Ivan George Elder – of Gore.
- Peter Mercer – of New Plymouth.
- James Henry Mitchell – of Oamaru.
- Eve Poole – of Invercargill.
- Mary Allan Ronnie (Mrs O'Connor) – of Auckland; national librarian, National Library of New Zealand, 1976–1981.
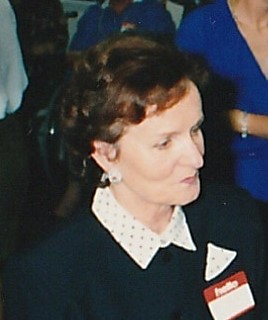
Eve Poole

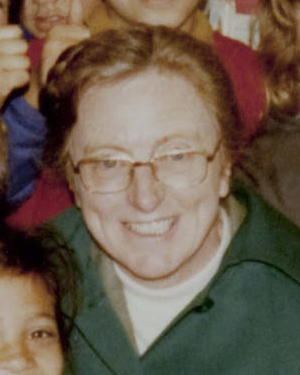
Mary Ronnie

== Queen's Service Medal (QSM) ==
=== For community service ===
- Florence Amy Balfour – of Gisborne.
- Rita Margaret Baughen – of Ashburton.
- Henry Desmond Bennett JP – of Wanganui.
- Margaret Napier Boyce – of Ongaonga.
- Sybil Elizabeth Clifton-Mogg – of Christchurch.
- Graham Thomas Condon – of Christchurch.
- Mildred Coursey – of Ōtāhuhu.
- John Fisher Davidson – of Christchurch.
- Vivienne Ellen Degenkolbe – of Auckland.
- William Vincett Griffin – of Wellington.
- James Clifford Harbut – of Christchurch.
- Helen Joyce Hole – of Tīrau.
- Olga May Jekyll – of Christchurch.
- Frederick William Harris Jones – of Tauranga.
- Shona Elsie Kempton – of Kaitangata.
- Helen Roberta Richardson Kidd – of Oamaru.
- Kathleen Dorothy Kirkby – of Tauranga.
- Gladys Elizabeth Lee – of Te Kūiti.
- Ella Margaret McLeod JP – of Wellington.
- Florence Isabel Mechen – of Christchurch.
- Joyce Meiklejohn – of Matakana.
- Winifred Edith Osborne – of Auckland.
- Isabel Winifred Palmer – of Auckland.
- Hazel Mary Phillips – of Auckland.
- Arnold Raymond Rae – of Kaitaia.
- Catherine Aird Suddaby – of Riverton.
- Minnie Doreen Sutton – of Gisborne.
- Arnold Thomas – of Auckland.
- Myra Everett Tripp – of Gore.
- Phyllis Cordelia Weir – of Christchurch.
- Tamati Wharehuia – of Te Puke.

=== For public services ===
- Douglas Ernest Aldridge JP – of Mount Maunganui.
- Vera Ballance – of Wellington.
- Richard Stuart Benner – of Kerikeri.
- The Reverend Father Patrick Lorenzo Bracken – of Murupara.
- Joan Millward Bull – of Hunterville.
- George Kenmir Bunce – of Auckland.
- Norman Allan Carran JP – of Taumarunui.
- Brian Leslie Cox – of Hastings.
- Kalapu Kula Fiaola – of Fakaofo, Tokelau; staff nurse, Tokelau Public Service.
- Harold Ernest Godber JP – of Auckland.
- Dorothy Steel Good – of Wellington.
- Milton William Laurence Gosling JP – of Tūrangi.
- Angela Mary Harwood – senior sergeant, New Zealand Police.
- Stanley Raymond Henry Keith – detective senior sergeant, New Zealand Police.
- Charles Cuthbert Knight QFSM JP – of Geraldine.
- Ronald Charles Lloyd – of Kaikohe.
- Vera Daphne Malone – of Kaponga.
- Louise Frances Miller JP – of Pukekohe.
- Thomas Richard Calvert Muir – of Tauranga.
- Bruce Herbert Orchard JP – of Inglewood.
- Iosefo Perez – of Nukunonu, Tokelau; radio operator, Tokelau Public Service.
- Elizabeth Stella Poole – of Queenstown.
- Francis Bernard Tully – senior constable, New Zealand Police,
- Gladys Mary Wallace – of Matamata.
- Edmund Bentley Wild JP – of Tuakau.

== Queen's Fire Service Medal (QFSM) ==
- Brian Fenton Hyland – lately fire force commander, New Zealand Fire Service, Christchurch (now fire commissioner, New Zealand Fire Service, Wellington).
- Anthony Ronald Lyford – fire commander, New Zealand Fire Service, Whangārei.
- Russell Edward Williams – chief fire officer, Darfield Volunteer Fire Brigade, New Zealand Fire Service.

== Air Force Cross (AFC) ==
- Wing Commander Kenneth Arthur Gayfer – Royal New Zealand Air Force.

== Queen's Commendation for Valuable Service in the Air ==
- Master Engineer John Walter Morris – Royal New Zealand Air Force.
