= Mawaihakona Stream =

River in New Zealand

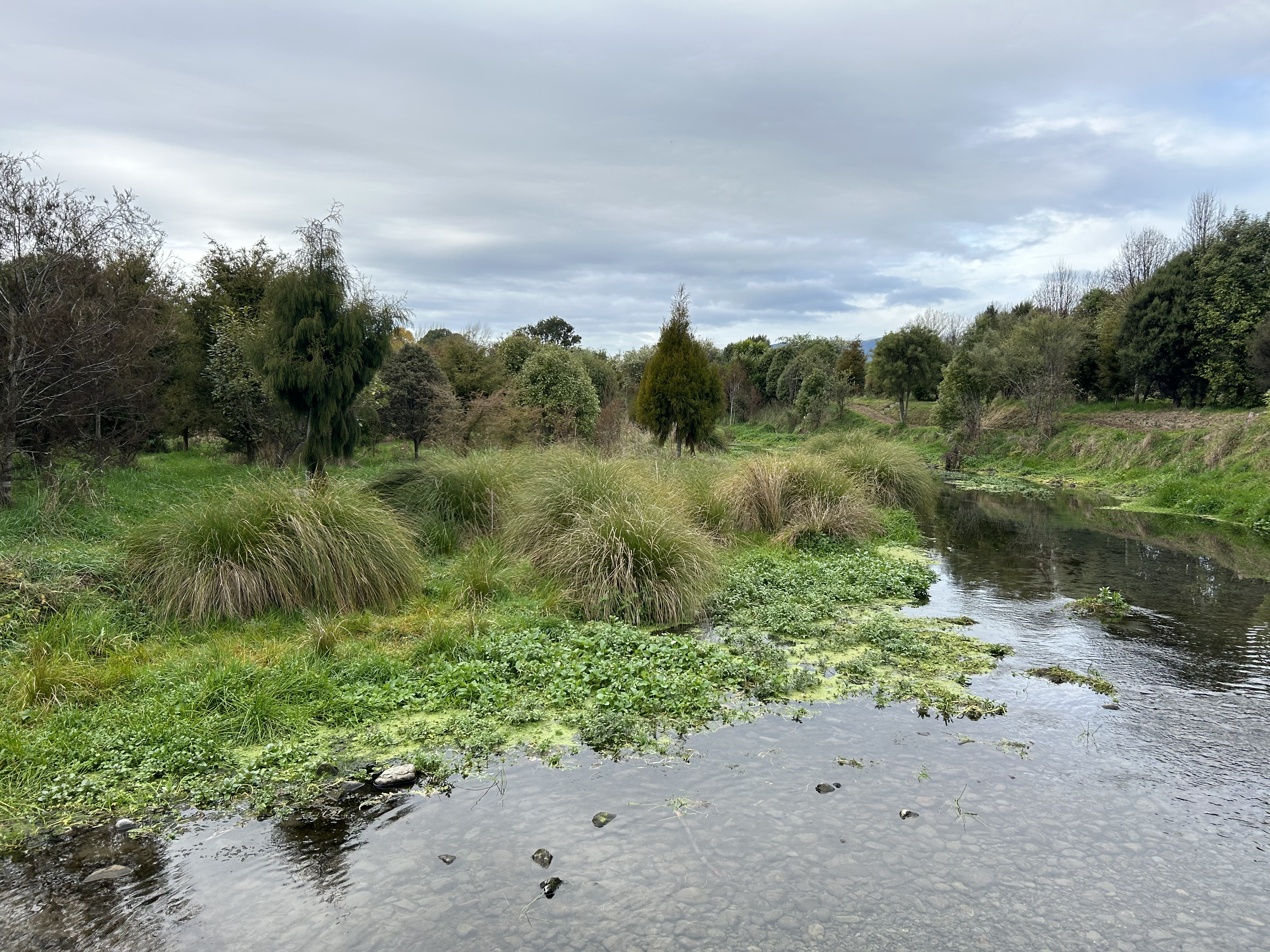
- Mawaihakona Stream showing replanted banks
- Route of the Mawaihakona Stream
- Native name: Māwai Hākona (Māori)

Location
- Country: New Zealand
- Island: North Island
- Region: Wellington
- District: Upper Hutt

Physical characteristics
- Source: Trentham Memorial Park
  - coordinates: 41.13103°S 175.03184°E
- Mouth: Te Awa Kairangi / Hutt River
  - coordinates: 41°08′33″S 175°00′07″E
  - elevation: 40 m (130 ft)

Basin features
- Progression: Mawaihakona Stream → Te Awa Kairangi / Hutt River → Wellington Harbour → Cook Strait → Pacific Ocean
- Cities: Upper Hutt (Trentham, Heretaunga, Silverstream)
- Bridges: Trentham Memorial Park footbridge, Barton Road bridge, Royal Wellington Gold Club cart bridges (8), Heretaunga Park Bridge

The Mawaihakona Stream (also known as Māwai Hākona Stream) is a small watercourse in Upper Hutt, in the North Island of New Zealand. The stream begins at a spring in Trentham Memorial Park and drains the western side of the Hutt Valley from Trentham to Heretaunga, flowing into the Hutt River north of the Silverstream bridge. An environmental restoration project has been underway since 2002 with the aim of restoring the health of the stream. Over 10,000 trees have been planted on the banks of the stream, and the stream bed has been progressively cleared of invasive exotic species. The project has been recognised with several environmental awards.

== Toponymy ==
The word Mawaihakona means "stream where clear water was scooped out". The name Mawai Hakona was the Māori name for the Trentham district, and was formerly used as the name for a settlement near Trentham railway station.

== Geography ==
The stream begins at a spring in Trentham Memorial Park and drains the western side of the Hutt Valley from Trentham to Heretaunga. It passes through the property of Wellington Golf Club, around Heretaunga Park and the perimeter of the playing fields of St Patrick's College, Silverstream and flows into the Hutt River north of the Silverstream bridge. In the section near Heretaunga Park the stream is broad and attracts a large number of ducks and other waterfowl.

== Introduction of grass carp ==
In 1997, Upper Hutt City Council and the Wellington Golf Club proposed to introduce diploid grass carp into the stream for aquatic weed control. The plan was opposed by the Wellington Fish and Game Council and Forest & Bird because of the potential environmental consequences if grass carp became established as a breeding population. The Upper Hutt City Council withdrew from the proposal, but in June 1998 a contractor for the Wellington Golf Club released 260 diploid carp into the stream. Consent had been obtained from the Department of Conservation and Ministry of Fisheries but not from the Wellington Fish and Game Council, who threatened legal action.

== Environmental restoration ==
=== History ===
In 2002, Bart Hogan established the Friends of the Mawaihakona Stream, with the aim of restoring the health of the stream. At that time, woody weeds including gorse, broom, blackberry, and alder grew along banks of the stream and the stream itself was choked with crack willow. The project aimed to remove those weeds and plant the stream banks with lowland forest species that were present prior to European settlement. The planting has included emergent forest trees such as rimu, tōtara, mataī and kahikatea. Pathways, bridges and seats were built to provide walkways through the planted areas. The work has been carried out by volunteers, and the native plants have been funded through grants and donations. The group Friends of the Mawaihakona Stream became a registered charity in 2014. By 2020, over 10,000 trees had been planted.

The stream has been overgrown with aquatic weeds. The oxygen weed Lagarosiphon major was first reported in the stream in 2003. Another invasive aquatic plant in the stream is cape pond weed. These weeds have to be removed by hand.

A fish ladder was constructed by Wellington Regional Council to assist fish to enter the stream from the Hutt River. Surveys of fish in the stream have revealed that eels and inanga are present.

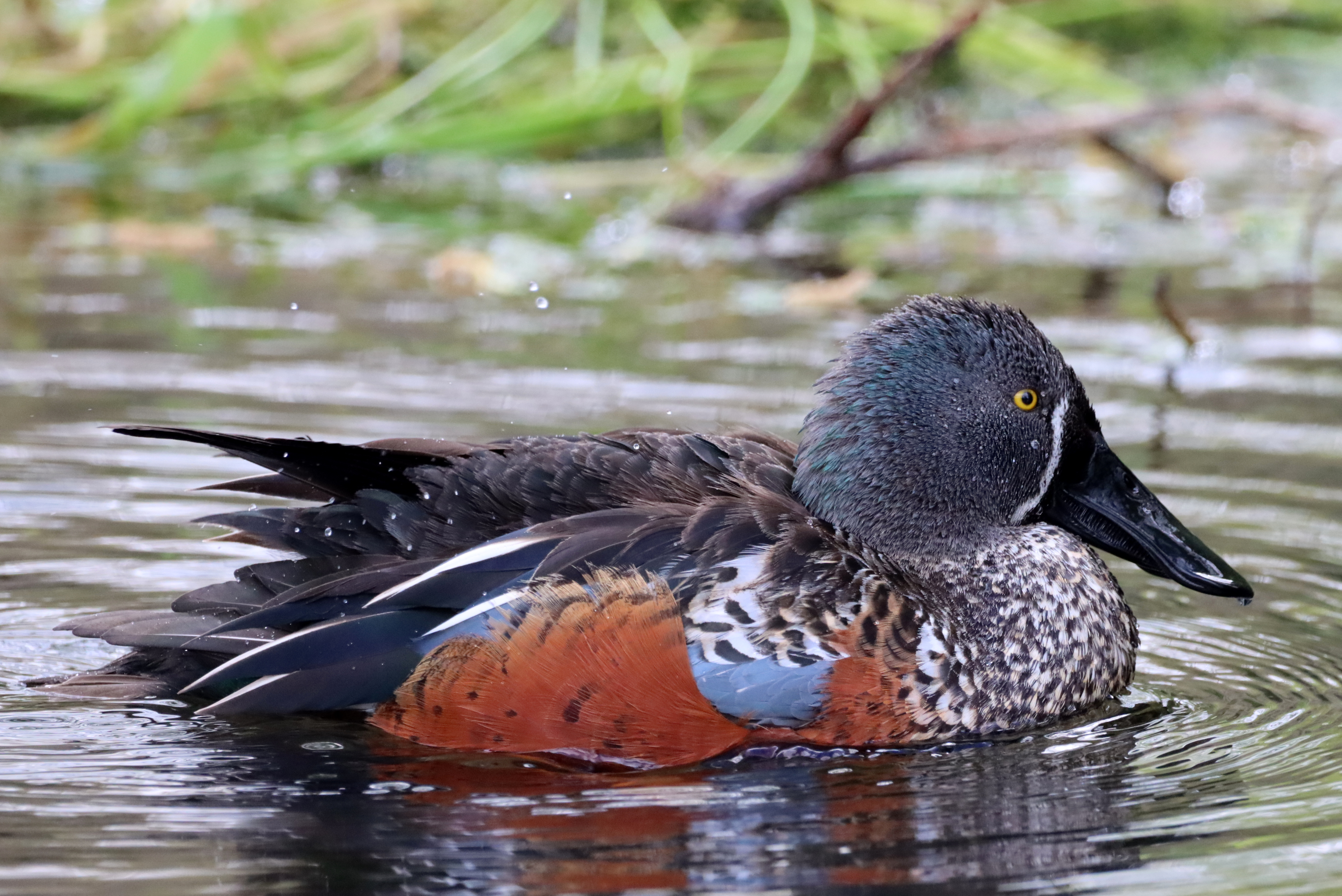
Australasian shoveler (male) in the Mawaihakona Stream

During the removal of willow from the stream, an 18-metre-long (59 ft) tōtara log was discovered. This was used to create large marker posts (pou rāhui) at each end of the replanted section of the stream signifying that the planted area has a rāhui or protected status.

=== Threat from adjacent land development ===
In 2020, a proposed major land development was announced for land immediately adjacent to the restored stream banks. The land is a flood plain of the Hutt River. To allow building on the site, the proposal was to raise the level of the land by 3 m (9.8 ft), requiring the placement of 550,000 m^{3} (19,000,000 cu ft) of fill, in a project that would take at least 7 years and potentially have a major impact on the planted area.

=== Awards ===
In August 2023, the Friends of the Mawaihakona Stream received both the Heritage and Environment Award and the Regional Supreme Award in the 2023 Wellington Airport Regional Community Awards - Upper Hutt. The project also won the Environmental and Sustainability Award at the 2024 Hutt Valley Sports Awards.
