= Charlie Dempsey (football administrator) =

New Zealand football administrator (1921–2008)

Charlie Dempsey CBE
- Born: Charles John Dempsey; 4 March 1921; Maryhill, Glasgow, Scotland
- Died: 24 June 2008 (aged 87); New Zealand
- Known for: Association football administrator

Charles John Dempsey CBE (4 March 1921 – 24 June 2008) was a Scottish-born New Zealand association football administrator.

== Early life ==
Dempsey was a builder and emigrated with his wife to New Zealand in 1952.

== Career ==
Dempsey was President of the Oceania Football Confederation (OFC) from 1982 to 2000 and continued as Honorary OFC President until the beginning of 2004. He served on the executive committee of FIFA from 1996 to 2000 but left his position two years early following the vote for the hosting of the 2006 World Cup. He was appointed to the FIFA Order of Merit in 2004.

Dempsey was appointed a Commander of the Order of the British Empire in the 1982 Queen's Birthday Honours for services to association football and in February 1990 he was awarded the New Zealand 1990 Commemoration Medal.

In July 2000, Dempsey abstained from FIFA's final round of voting for the 2006 FIFA World Cup in a move that eventually saw the competition being awarded to Germany rather than South Africa. Dempsey said that he did not vote because of the "intolerable pressure" from supporters of the German and South African bids, and of the attempts that had been made to bribe him. FIFA rejected calls for a new vote and opened an internal inquiry into the allegations of corruption. Dempsey stood down from his role in September 2000 as he was unable to accept what had taken place over the days after the vote.

== Death ==
Dempsey died on 24 June 2008 aged 87, although some sources reported it as 86. He was survived by his wife and two daughters, one of whom, Josephine, served as General-Secretary of the OFC.
