= Elizabeth Lissaman =

New Zealand potter (1901–1991)

Elizabeth Lissaman OBE
- Born: Elizabeth Hazel Lissaman; 1 October 1901; Blenheim, New Zealand
- Died: 18 February 1991 (aged 89); Cambridge, New Zealand
- Known for: Ceramics

Elizabeth Hazel Lissaman OBE (11 October 1901 – 18 February 1991) was a New Zealand studio potter.

Lissaman was born in Blenheim and grew up on her family's sheep station, Waireka, near Seddon.

In 1969, Lissaman published Pottery for Pleasure in Australia and New Zealand, a book designed to support potters working with Australasian clays.

Lissaman was appointed an Officer of the Order of the British Empire, for services to pottery, in the 1982 Queen's Birthday Honours. Her work is held in several public collections, including the Museum of New Zealand Te Papa Tongarewa and the Sarjeant Gallery.

Lissaman died in Cambridge in 1991.

== Publications ==
- Lissaman, Elizabeth (1977). Pottery for pleasure in Australia and New Zealand. Sydney: Reed. ISBN 9780589002978.
