= Rick Barton =

Rick Barton may refer to:

- Rick Barton (diplomat) (born 1949), United States diplomat, educator and author
- Rick Barton (musician), American guitarist and singer
- Fredrick Barton, American novelist and New Orleans film critic

== See also ==
- Richard Barton (disambiguation)
