= Richard John Barton =

Richard John Barton (II)
- Born: 27 December 1879; Trentham, New Zealand
- Died: 26 May 1931 (aged 51); Masterton, New Zealand
- Other name: R J Barton
- Known for: Author of "Earliest New Zealand", Farmer in the Wairarapa
- Relatives: Richard Barton (grand-father); Rev. John Gare Butler (great-grandfather); Sir James Hector (father in-law)

Richard John Barton II (27 December 1879 – 26 May 1931) was a New Zealand pastoralist, runholder, businessman and author in the early 20th century in Wellington and the Wairarapa.

== Life ==
=== Early life ===
Richard John Barton was born on 27 December 1879 at Trentham (The Barton Estate) in the Upper Hutt Valley. His family owned generous landholdings in the Hutt Valley and the Wairarapa due to his grandfather Richard Barton being a pioneer settler in New Zealand. His father John Barton inherited the properties of Trentham, Whiterock and other farming stations in the Wellington region. The Barton family were early farmers in the region as well as Wairarapa during the late 19th century.

=== Education ===
With prosperous estates, Barton was educated at the Wanganui Collegiate School, a colonial boarding school established by Sir George Grey. Barton was educated here during the tenure of Walter Empson, an Oxford Alumni who became Headmaster.

=== Marriage ===
In 1906 he married Georgina Hector, the daughter of Sir James Hector, at St Augustine's Church, Petone. After the wedding a reception was held at Sir James Hector's home, Ratanui. They went on to have five sons and one daughter.

== Business ==
=== Farming ===
Like his father and grandfather, Barton became a pastoralist and was engaged in the family farms at Trentham and in the Wairarapa. In the 1890s the Barton family bought the coastal portion of the Mataikona Station from John Johnston. In 1899 he became manager of the Mataikona in the east coast of the Wairarapa before becoming part of the family partnership in 1915, supervising the run. He extended the farms up towards the Upper plains, known as "Tapia".

Some time between 1904 and 1906 Barton offered to sell the Wellington Golf Club 48.5 hectares of their Heretaunga/Trentham farm which is now the Royal Wellington Golf Club.

=== Associations and clubs ===
Barton was associated with many of Wairarapa's foundation business societies including:

- President of the Masterton A. and P. Association.
- Member of the Wairarapa Provincial Executive of the Farmers Union.
- Member of the Masterton-Waipukarau Railway League.

Barton was a foundation member of the Tinui-Wahatahi Rifle Club and a member of the Opaki Rifle Club. He was also a mountaineer, with his name given to "Barton's Track" over Mitre Peak in the Tararua Ranges.

=== Author ===
In 1927 Barton published a compilation of the journals and correspondence of Reverend John Gare Butler, who was his great-grandfather. The book was titled "Earliest New Zealand" and described Butler's pioneer missionary work in the Bay of Islands from 1819 to 1824 prior to the signing of the Treaty of Waitangi.

The compilation took over 15 years, including research from the Early Missionary records of the Hocken Library in Otago, and the Turnbull Library in Wellington. The book was dedicated to his father John Barton for "careful custody of old family papers".

During this time it was also noted that he gifted the following items to the Hocken Library in Otago:

- A letter from the Rev. Samuel Marsden to the Rev. John Butler, dated 1823 and written from Keri Keri in the Bay of Islands.
- A volume of psalms and hymns published in 1828 by Rev. John Butler.

== Death ==
Richard John Barton died suddenly on 26 May 1931 at the age of 51. A telegraph of his obituary was published in the Evening Post within a day and it was noted he was "well known in the Wellington and Wairarapa district".
