= Lance Richdale =

New Zealand teacher and amateur ornithologist (1900–1983)

Lance Richdale OBE
- Born: Lancelot Eric Richdale; 4 January 1900; Marton, New Zealand
- Died: 19 December 1983 (aged 83); Auckland, New Zealand
- Education: University of Otago
- Occupations: Teacher; Amateur ornithologist
- Scientific career
- Thesis: A history of agricultural education in New Zealand (1935)

Lancelot Eric Richdale OBE (4 January 1900 – 19 December 1983) was a New Zealand teacher and amateur ornithologist.

== Biography ==
Born at Marton, New Zealand and educated in Wanganui, Richdale became a teacher based in Dunedin after obtaining a diploma in 1922 from Hawkesbury Agricultural College near Sydney, Australia.

Richdale's main ornithological interest was in seabirds, especially penguins and petrels, and he was engaged in long-term studies of various species for most of his life. He was the driving force to gain protection for the colony of northern royal albatrosses at Taiaroa Head, Otago, after discovering the first successful fledgling there in 1938. Richdale completed a Master's degree at the University of Otago in 1935, with a thesis on the history of agricultural education in New Zealand. Although his fieldwork was carried out in southern New Zealand, he spent some time studying overseas, as a Fulbright Fellow at Cornell University (1950–1951), as a Nuffield Research Fellow at the Edward Grey Institute for Bird Research (1952–1955) and, after retirement, again as a Nuffield Fellow, at the Zoological Society of London (1960–1963).

He was a member of the Royal Australasian Ornithologists Union (RAOU) and contributed numerous papers to its journal, the Emu as well as to several other scientific journals. He produced a series of popular booklets about New Zealand birds as well as a series of biological monographs to publish the results of his research. In addition, he authored two major books, Sexual Behavior in Penguins (University of Kansas Press, 1951), and A Population Study of Penguins (Clarendon Press, 1957).

His publications earned him a DSc from the University of New Zealand in 1952, and in 1953 he was awarded the Hector Memorial Medal by the Royal Society of New Zealand. He was appointed an Officer of the Order of the British Empire, for services to ornithology, in the 1982 Queen's Birthday Honours.

Richdale died in Auckland in 1983.

In 2016, Richdale's archival documents of his ornithological studies, held in the Hocken Collections in Dunedin, were included in the UNESCO Memory of the World Aotearoa New Zealand Ngā Mahara o te Ao register.
