= Barton's Bush =

Coordinates: 41.130800°S 175.029148°E

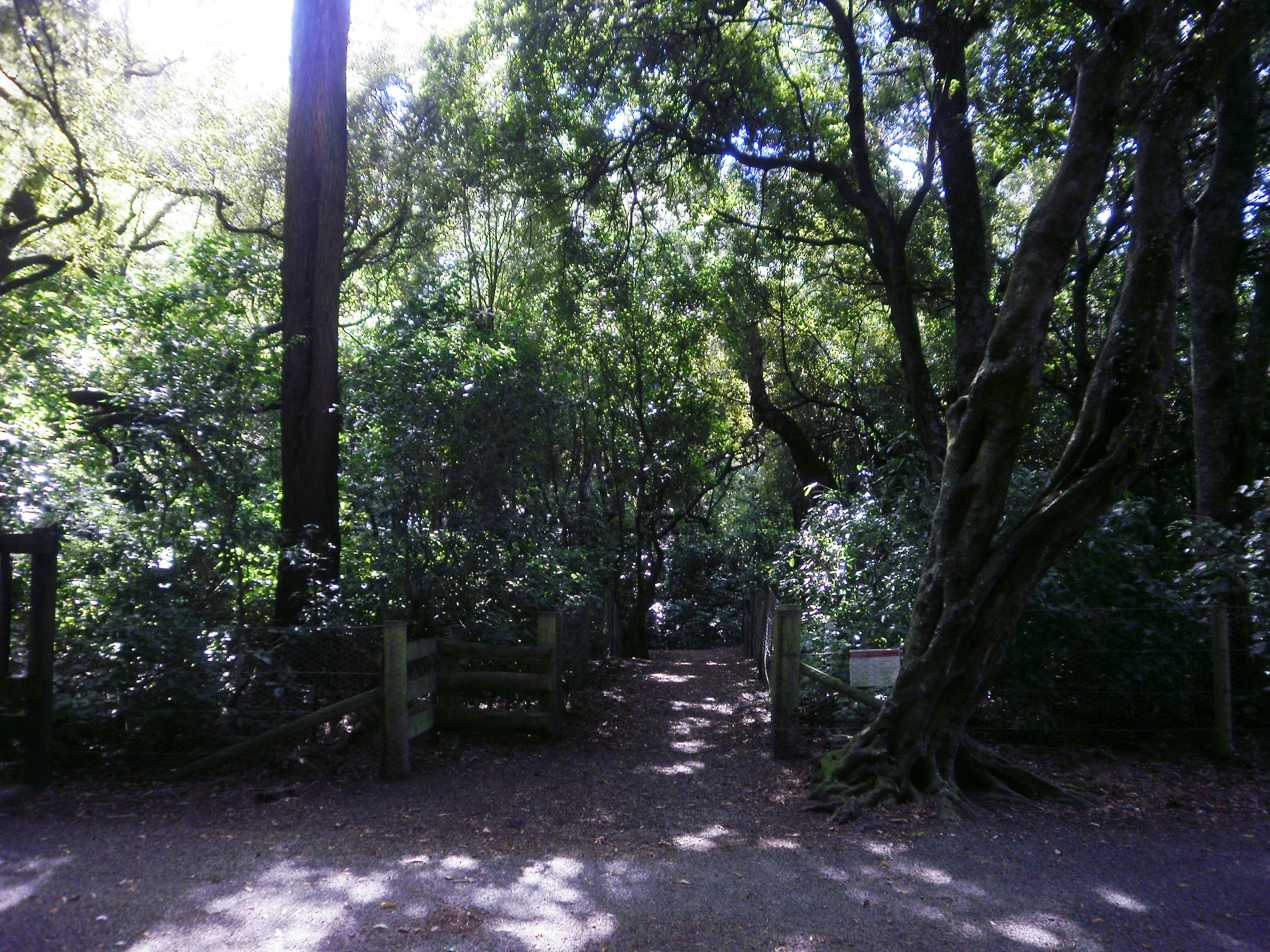
An entrance to Barton's Bush

Barton's Bush, in Trentham Memorial Park, is the largest remaining area of lowland podocarp/broadleaf mixed forest in the Hutt Valley of New Zealand. Named after Richard Barton who settled in the area in 1841, it was his desire that this section of the native forest should remain whilst the city of Upper Hutt gradually took shape and land was cleared for farming and settling.

== History ==
In 1841, Richard Barton purchased 40 hectares (100 acres) of land in the upper Hutt Valley. He modeled his development of his estate on that of Trentham in England, where he had been a supervisor of the estate. This meant part of the land was cleared for farming and settlement while some of it was left as natural bush land. Over time, Barton and his wife acquired more land so that eventually his estate extended from Quinns Post to Silverstream to the west of the Main Road and on both sides of the Hutt River.

By 1924, Barton's descendants had started to clear the remaining native bush on the estate. Attempts were made to protect the remaining bush as a public reserve through discussions with the family as well as representation to the Minister of Lands. However, it was only in 1950 that £26,000 (£2,020,000 in 2012 values) was able to be raised to purchase the bush area. Of the money raised, £13,000 came from a War Memorial subsidy while the remainder was one third public subscription and one third each from the Upper Hutt Borough and Hutt County Councils.

While the acquisition of Barton's Bush was intended to preserve the bush remnant as an indication of what the forest had been like before the Europeans came to New Zealand, it was far from pristine. During the 1940s, the area was logged. Based on the remaining stumps, over 100 tōtara had been felled, while the bush was also infested with the exotic pest plants Old Mans Beard (Clematis Vitalba) and Wandering Jew (Tradescantia Fluminensis), both detrimental to the forest. Since 1980 a control programme has actively removed these pest plants and supplementary plantings have encouraged native flora development.

In recent years, the bush tracks have been gravelled and lightly fenced to provide clear walking paths while protecting the forest, discouraging people and animals from wandering off the formed tracks and inadvertently damaging the natural undergrowth.

== Flora ==
More than 100 different species of native plants live in Barton's Bush. Most of the mature canopy trees are tawa, with some tōtara, mataī and kahikatea canopy trees also present. There is also a broad range of native undercanopy trees and other undergrowth plants. While it has been subject to some human modification, Barton's Bush still gives a good indication of the sort of lowland forest that the European settlers encountered when they first moved into the Hutt Valley.
