= Trentham Memorial Park =

Recreation ground in Upper Hutt, New Zealand

- Interactive map of Trentham Memorial Park
- Type: Sport and recreational park
- Location: Upper Hutt, New Zealand
- Coordinates: 41.132°S 175.029°E
- Area: 48 ha (120 acres)
- Created: 1950
- Operator: Upper Hutt City Council

Trentham Memorial Park is a large park and a major sport and recreation ground in Trentham, a suburb of Upper Hutt, in the Wellington region of New Zealand. The park lies between Fergusson Drive and the Hutt River and is described by the local council as an attractive setting for sports, carnivals, picnics, playgrounds and bush walks. There is a range of sporting pursuits available in the park including rugby, football, cricket, harriers and an axeman's club.

== History ==
The land had been owned by the Barton family (descendants of Richard Barton) for many years and was known as Barton's Bush. There had been several attempts to buy and preserve the bush since the 1920s. Finally in 1950, Upper Hutt Council bought the bush and other land (67 acres of reserve and 59 acres of virgin rain forest) from the Barton family for use as Upper Hutt's Second World War memorial. The central Government also committed funds to the park, which now covers an area of 48 hectares (120 acres). The first public event in the park was the Wellington and Hutt Valley A. and P. Association's show in February 1956.

Memorial gates and a wall were built at the Fergusson Drive entrance to the park in 1959. In the 1980s, the wall was demolished and the gates moved to a different entrance to the park. In 2011, a new memorial was unveiled at Fergusson Drive. This is a refurbished concrete mural removed from the Upper Hutt Returned and Services' Association's former building. On Armistice Day 2020, a tree said to be descended from the Gallipoli 'Lone Pine' was planted near the memorial.

== Facilities ==
The Mawaihakona Stream begins at a spring in Trentham Memorial Park and drains the western side of the Hutt Valley from Trentham to Heretaunga. The stream flows into the Hutt River north of the Silverstream bridge.

The park includes:

- Barton's Bush – a native forest reserve
- Domain Bush - a smaller native forest remnant
- Walking tracks
- Barton Oval – a formal cricket oval
- Indoor and outdoor cricket nets

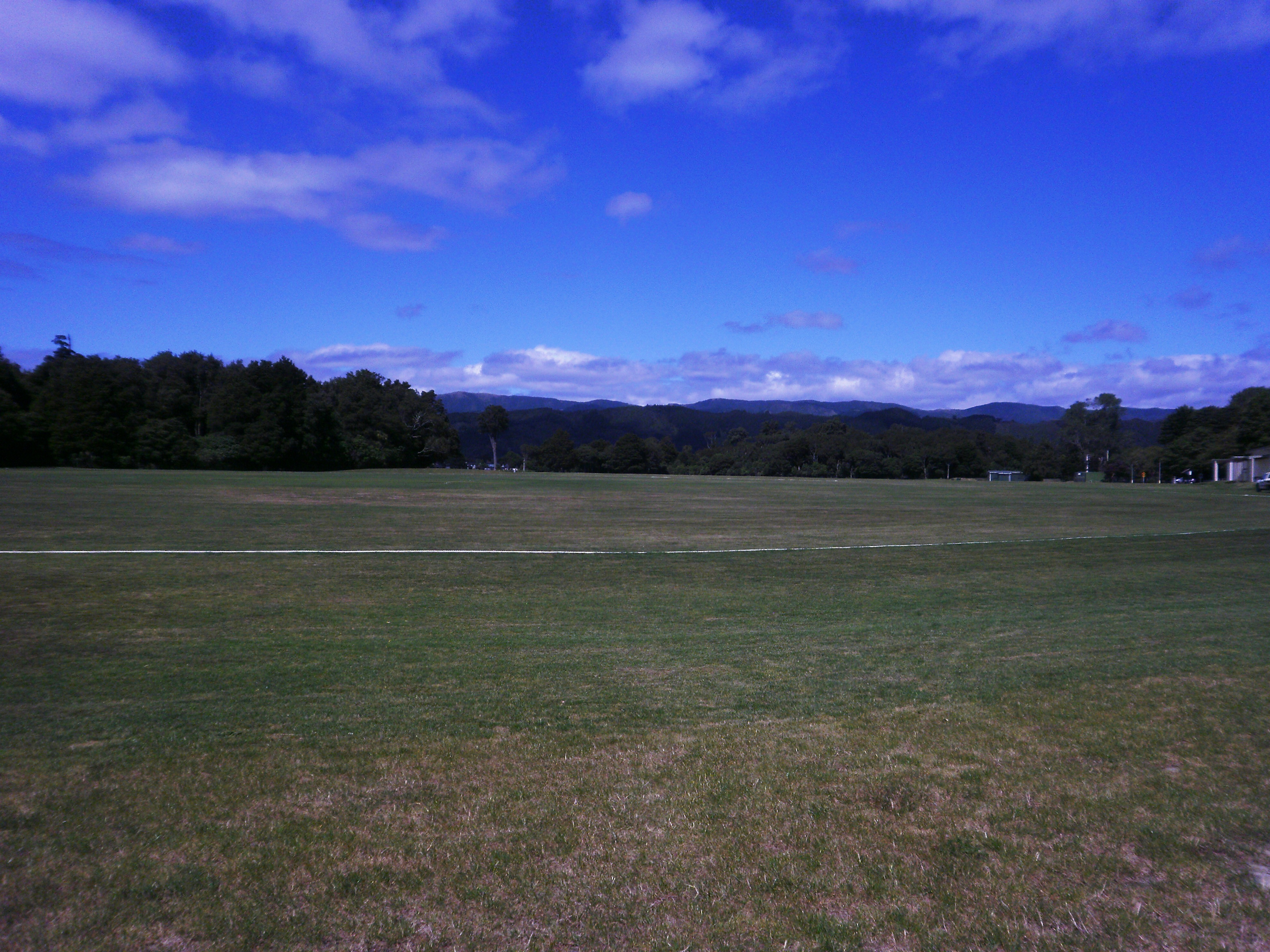
Trentham Memorial Park looking across Barton Oval

- Sports grounds for cricket and rugby
- Clubrooms
- Children's playground
- Car park
- Open space to hold concerts, carnivals and public displays, (such as fireworks and car shows)
