= 1989 Birthday Honours (New Zealand) =

Awards list for New Zealand

The 1989 Queen's Birthday Honours in New Zealand, celebrating the official birthday of Elizabeth II, were appointments made by the Queen in her right as Queen of New Zealand, on the advice of the New Zealand government, to various orders and honours to reward and highlight good works by New Zealanders. They were announced on 17 June 1989.

The recipients of honours are displayed here as they were styled before their new honour.

== Knight Bachelor ==
- Robert Edward Jones – of Lower Hutt. For services to business management and the community.
- Professor Ian Hugh Kāwharu – of Auckland. For services to the Māori people.
- The Right Honourable (Mr Justice) Edward Jonathan Somers – of Wellington; judge of the Court of Appeal.
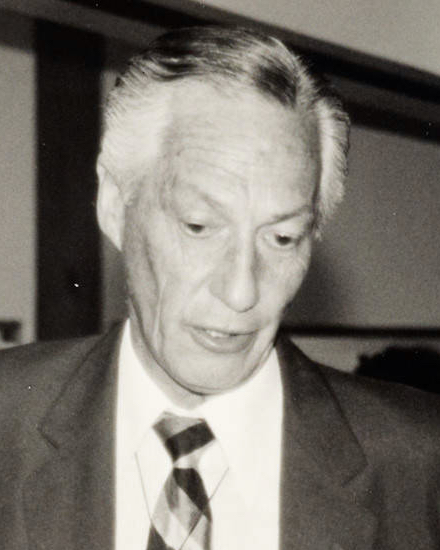
Sir Hugh Kāwharu

== Order of Saint Michael and Saint George ==
=== Companion (CMG) ===
- Malcolm Leitch Cameron – of Wellington; lately director-general, Ministry of Agriculture and Fisheries.
- Denis Bazeley Gordon McLean – of Wellington; lately Secretary of Defence.
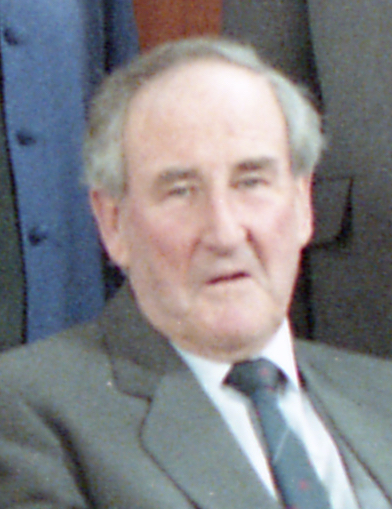
Malcolm Cameron

== Order of the British Empire ==
=== Dame Commander (DBE) ===
Civil division

- Silvia Rose Cartwright – of Wellington. For services to women.
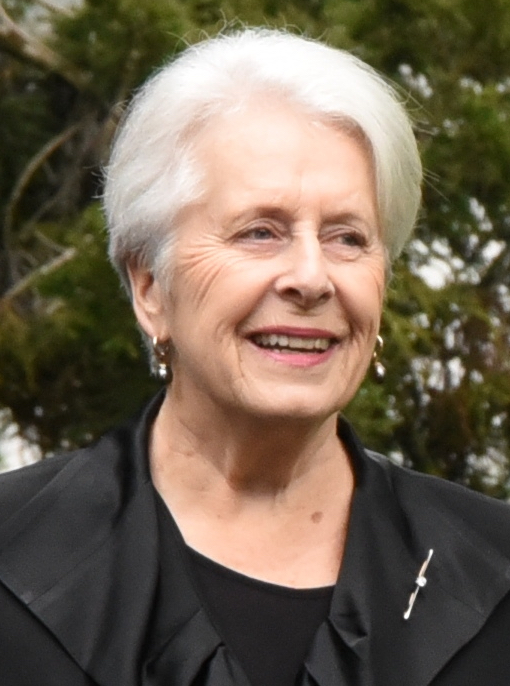
Dame Silvia Cartwright

=== Knight Commander (KBE) ===
Civil division

- Ross Malcolm Jansen CBE JP – of Hamilton. For services to local government.

=== Commander (CBE) ===
Civil division

- Malcolm Thomas Churches OBE – lately Commissioner of Police, New Zealand Police.
- Ruth Dallas (Ruth Minnie Mumford) – of Dunedin. For services to literature.
- John Harold Gray OBE ED – of Christchurch; general manager and town clerk, Christchurch City Council.
- Dr Charmian Jocelyn O'Connor JP – of Auckland. For services to chemistry, education and the community.
- Professor Thomas Vianney O'Donnell – of Wellington. For services to medicine.
- Heughan Bassett (Hugh) Rennie – of Wellington; chairman, Broadcasting Corporation of New Zealand, 1984–1988.
- Peter John Trapski – of Wellington; lately chief District Court judge.
- Gillian Constance Weir – of Tilehurst, Berkshire, United Kingdom. For services to music.

Military division

- Air Commodore Robin John Klitscher DFC AFC – Royal New Zealand Air Force.
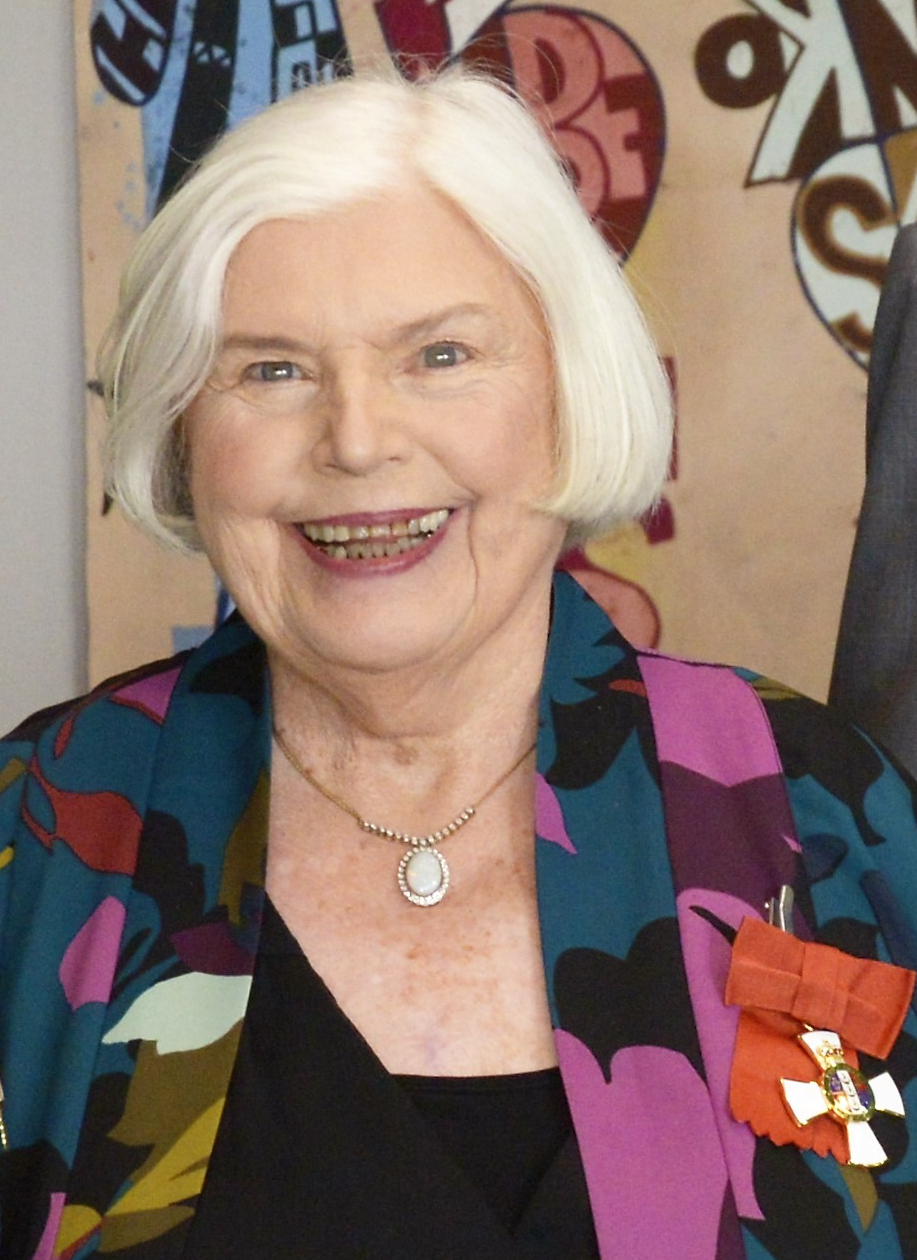
Charmian O'Connor

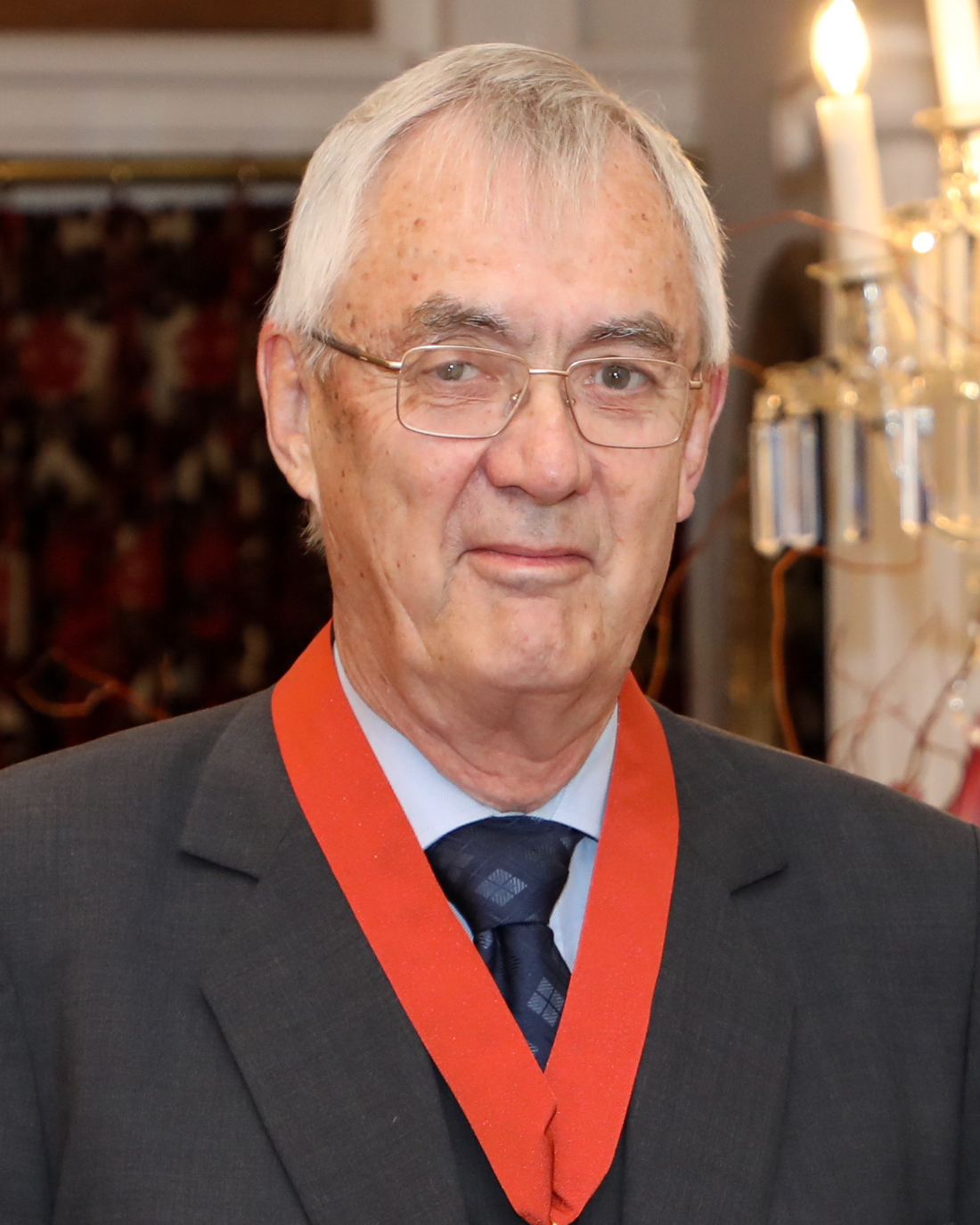
Hugh Rennie

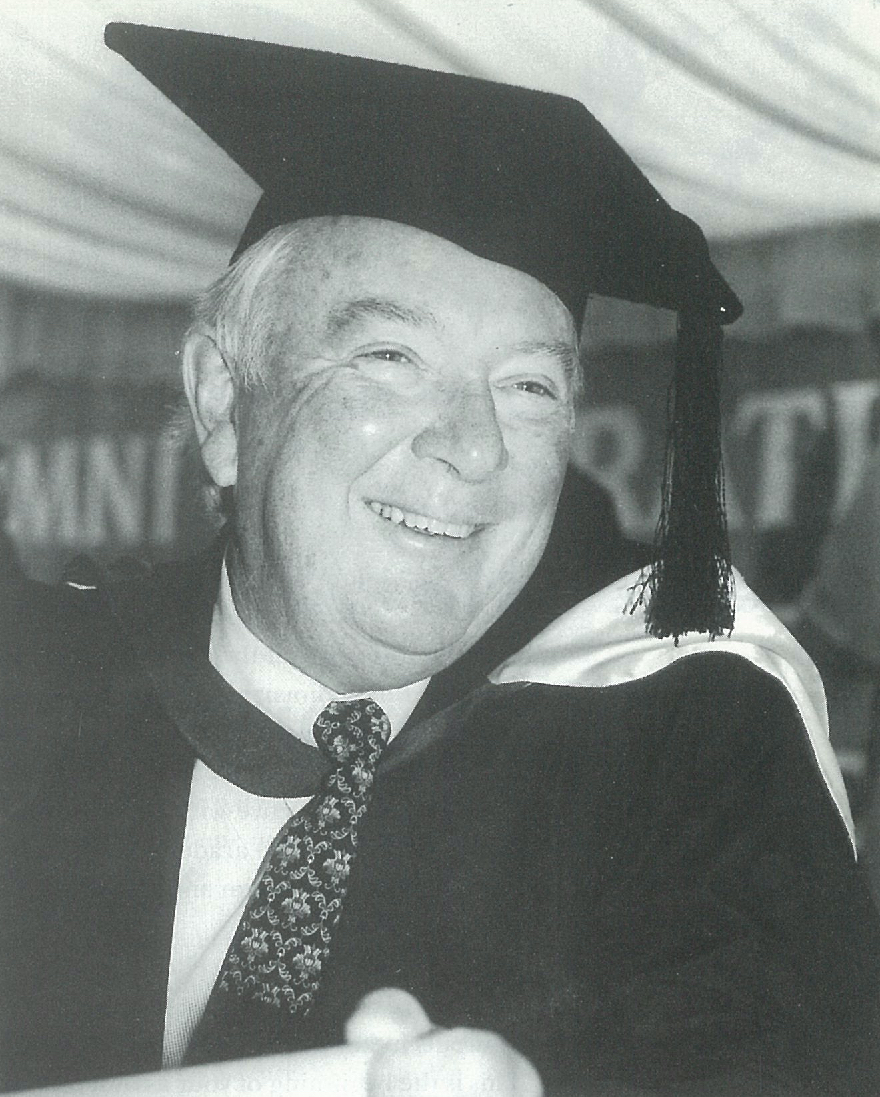
Peter Trapski

=== Officer (OBE) ===
Civil division

- Gordon Harold Brown – of Waimauku. For services to art history.
- Professor Arthur Derek Campbell – of Dunedin. For services to science.
- Raymond John Chappell – of Lower Hutt; lately managing director, The Rural Bank.
- Peter Kerry Clark – of Auckland. For services to bowls.
- Mervyn Frank Gorringe – of Mangaweka. For services to local government.
- Dr George Condor Hitchcock DFC – of Auckland. For services to medicine.
- Olwyn Joan Holland – of Auckland. For services to education.
- Paul Burbridge Lynch – of Levin. For services to agricultural science.
- Denford Coll McDonald – of Tawa. For services to the motor-vehicle industry.
- Francis Graham Milne Parkinson – of Palmerston North; deputy chairman, National Roads Board.
- Jennifer Lynette Pattrick – of Wellington. For services to the arts.
- Henry Romanes – of Havelock North. For services to local government.
- Francis Ryan – of Auckland. For services to local government.
- Linden Charles Mansell Saunders – of Auckland. For services to music.
- Tuke Tere Waamu – of Te Kūiti. For services to the community.
- Kenneth Stewart Thomson – of Dargaville. For services to the veterinary profession.
- Tennant Edward Wilson – of Lower Hutt. For services to sport.
- Peter Gerhard Wiersma – assistant commissioner, New Zealand Police.
- Ronald Wood – of Te Puke. For services to local government.

Military division

- Captain Edwin Stanley Eide – Royal New Zealand Navy.
- Colonel Stuart David Jameson – Colonels' List, New Zealand Army
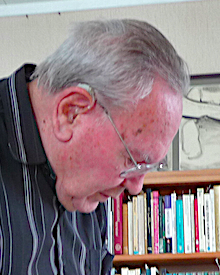
Gordon H. Brown

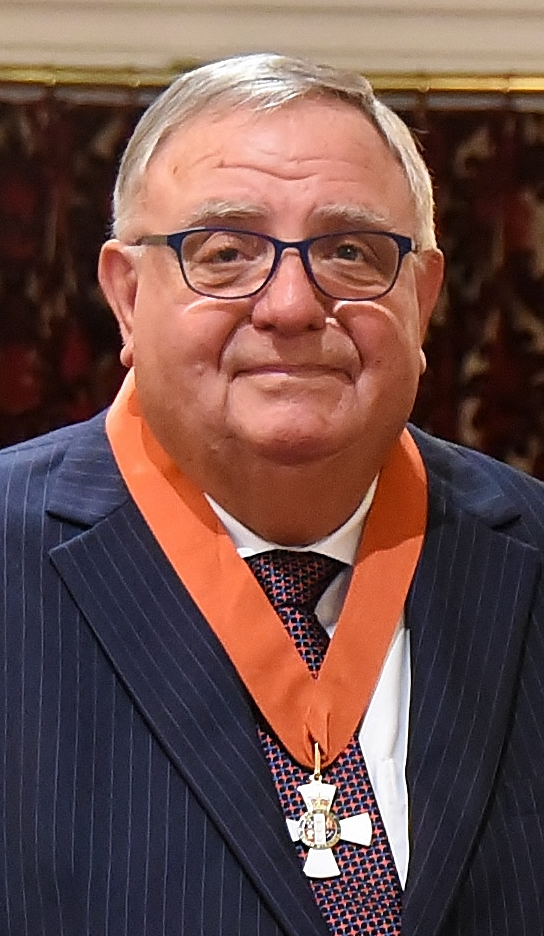
Kerry Clark

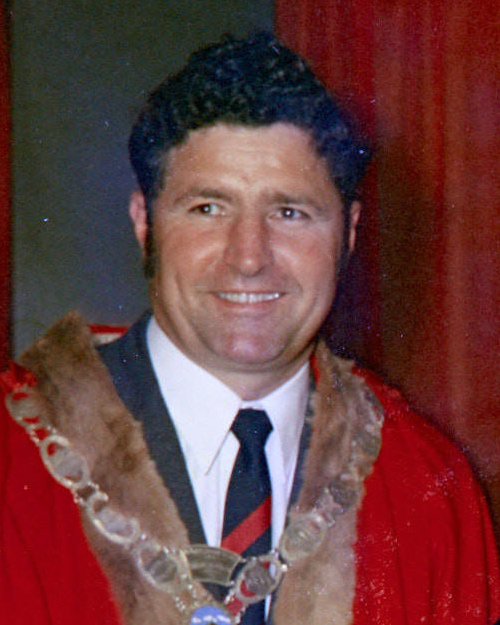
Frank Ryan

=== Member (MBE) ===
Civil division

- Jeffrey Victor Archibald – of Auckland. For services to hockey.
- Peter John Babich – of Auckland. For services to the viticultural industry.
- Raymond Kelvin Breeze – of Hokitika. For services to sport and the community.
- Simon John Cave – of Gisborne. For services to farming.
- John Brynn Christie – of Orewa. For services to manufacturing, sport and the community.
- John William Coley – of Christchurch. For services to art.
- Ruth Janice Cowell – of Christchurch. For services to education.
- Margaret Mary Darby JP – of Christchurch; lately chief nurse, Canterbury Hospital Board.
- Frank Dickson – of Wellington. For services to banking and the community.
- Daniel John Duggan – of Wellington. For services to the trade-union movement.
- Peter Dick Fredatovich – of Auckland. For services to the viticultural industry.
- Dr Bruce Robert Noel Golden – of Auckland. For services to aviation medicine.
- Gordon Alick Hookings – of Auckland. For services to education and gliding.
- James Bryce Jones – of Havelock North. For services to the Order of St John and the community.
- Anthony Bruce Kendall – of Auckland. For services to boardsailing.
- Ina Mabel Lamason – of Auckland. For services to cricket and hockey.
- Warren Kenneth Lees – of Dunedin. For services to cricket.
- Kerry Leigh Francis Marshall JP – of Nelson. For services to local government.
- Maurice Lane Marshall – of Hamilton. For services to education and sport.
- Noel Cedric Messenger – of Tītahi Bay. For services to sport and the community.
- Anthony Robin Le Clerc Mosse – of Auckland. For services to swimming.
- Horo Himi Te Waihika (Jim) Pou – of Whangārei. For services to the community.
- George Newton Te Au – of Invercargill. For services to sport and the community.
- Geoffrey Garth Thornton – of Wellington. For services to preservation of New Zealand's architectural heritage.
- Wilfred Ernest Wagener JP – of Kaitaia. For services to technical education and the building industry.

Military division

- Warrant Officer Class Two David James Fitzwater – Corps of Royal New Zealand Engineers.
- Warrant Officer Class One Brian John Fleming – Royal New Zealand Infantry Regiment.
- Warrant Officer Class Two Matthew John Te Pou BEM – Royal Regiment of New Zealand Artillery.
- Squadron Leader William Alexander Kennet Currie BEM – Royal New Zealand Air Force.
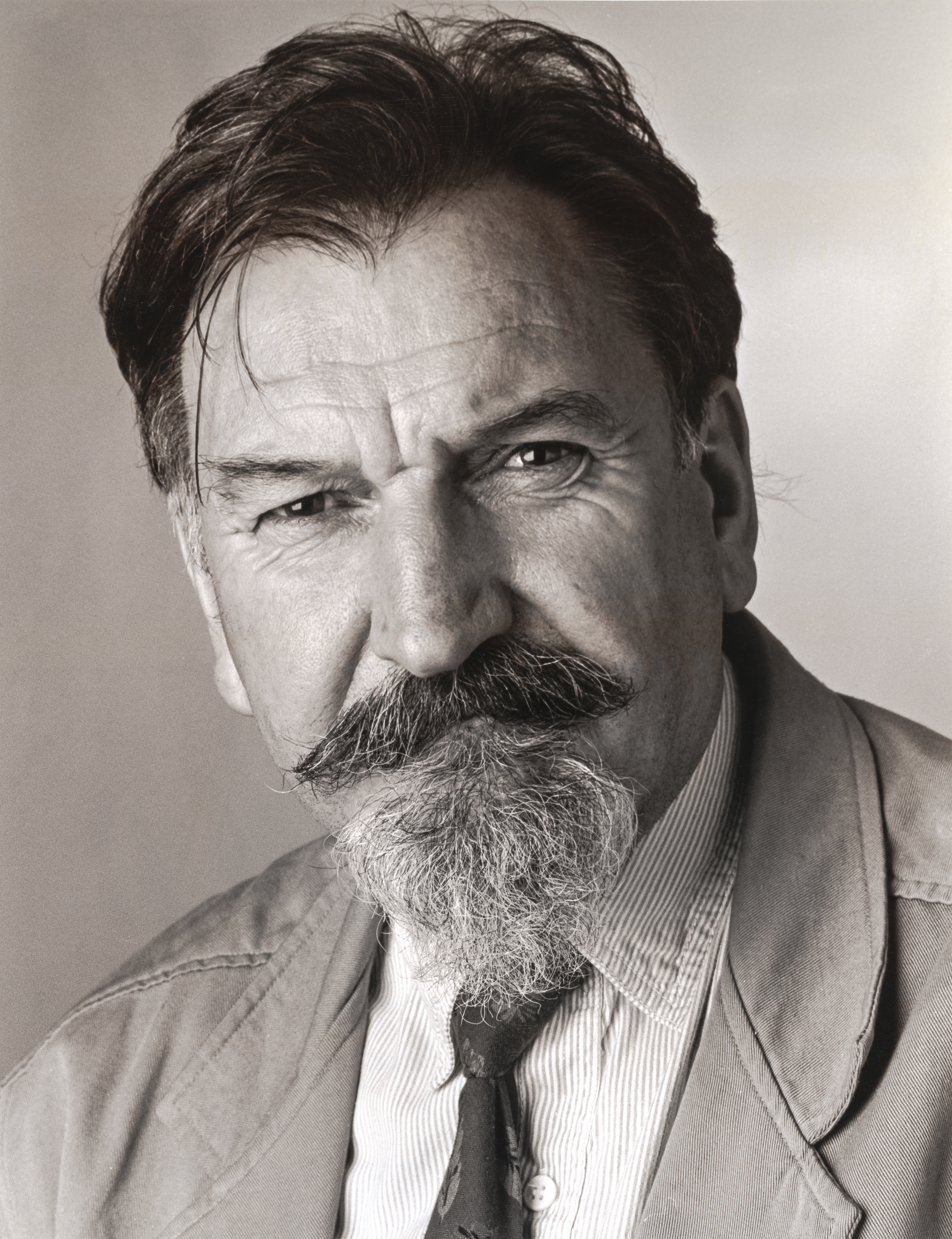
John Coley

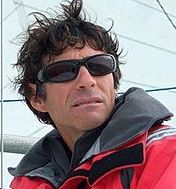
Bruce Kendall

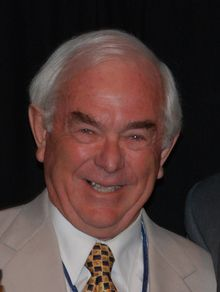
Kerry Marshall

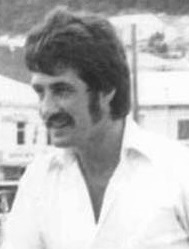
Warren Lees

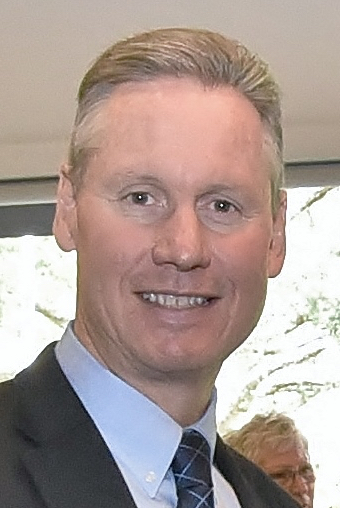
Anthony Mosse

== British Empire Medal (BEM) ==
Military division

- Lance Corporal Brent Michael Palmer – Royal New Zealand Army Medical Corps.
- Sergeant Peter Grant Reece – Royal New Zealand Air Force.

== Companion of the Queen's Service Order (QSO) ==
=== For community service ===
- Pauline May Ayres – of Wanganui.
- Rua Cooper – of Papakura.
- Frances Maria, Lady Nordmeyer – of Wellington.
- Hamiora (Sam) Raumati – of Waitara.
- Colonel James Ingram Miles Smail OBE MC TD DL – of Berwick-upon-Tweed, Northumberland, United Kingdom.

=== For public services ===
- John Murray Black – of Taupō.
- John Brian Burke JP – of Porirua.
- Mervyn Wilkinson Hancock JP – of Palmerston North.
- John Sedgley Hickman – of Wellington; lately director, New Zealand Meteorological Service, Ministry of Transport.
- Arthur Leonard Humphries DFM JP – of Invercargill.
- John Klaricich JP – of Hokianga.
- Ian Dallas Leggat – of Christchurch.
- Dr Dorothy Muriel Ellen Liddell – of Christchurch.
- Bryan Henry Palmer MBE ED – of Amberley.
- Ralph William Pile – of Palmerston.
- Elwyn Stuart Richardson – of Auckland.
- John Francis William Wybrow – of Wellington.
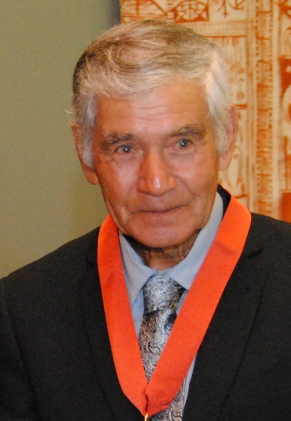
John Klaricich

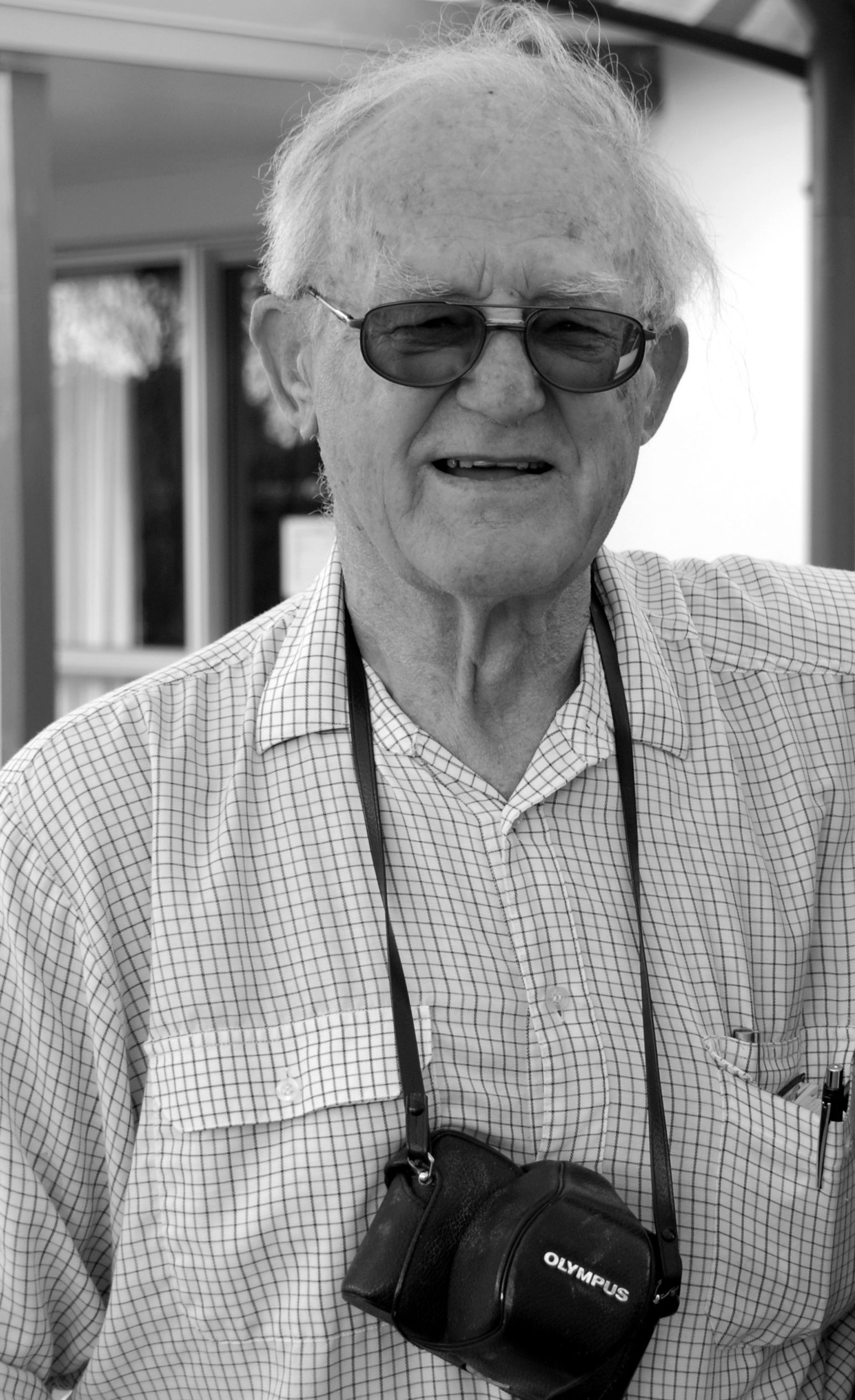
Elwyn Richardson

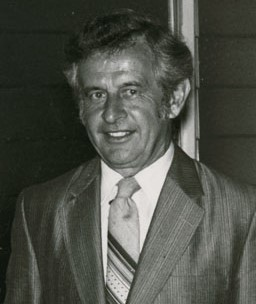
John Wybrow

== Queen's Service Medal (QSM) ==
=== For community service ===
- Lulu Ruhia Maria Anderson – of Thames.
- Alice Frances Biddle – of Maungaturoto.
- Dulcie Roma Blair – of Auckland.
- Ralph Hugh Blair – of Auckland.
- Lindsay Mostyn Buick-Constable JP – of Eastbourne.
- Jens Bukholt – of Wanganui.
- Karen Margrethe Bukholt – of Wanganui.
- Barbara Jean Cameron Cave – of Dunedin.
- Ellen Doreen Condick – of Christchurch.
- Ian James Farquhar – of Dunedin.
- Shirley Agnes Farquhar – of Dunedin.
- Stuart John Gordon – of Ōtaki Beach.
- Anne Lynette Hawker – of Mosgiel.
- Ormond James Innes – of Christchurch.
- Eva Anne Lanauze – of Pitt Island.
- Kora Hildyard Lang – of Paraparaumu.
- Allen Joseph Little JP – of Levin.
- Stephen Lock – of Wellington.
- William Robert McConnell – of Auckland.
- Winifred Honor McKellar – of Dunedin.
- Joan Catherine Mahony – of Christchurch.
- Lucy Carlile Marshall – of Auckland.
- The Reverend James David Milne – of Auckland.
- David John Monroe – of Christchurch.
- Sydney Archibald Muirhead – of Oamaru.
- The Reverend Puti Hopaea Murray – of Kaitaia.
- Thakor Parbhu – of Auckland.
- Joseph Samuel – of Auckland.
- Alexander Schiff – of Wellington.
- Mere Nutana Taka JP – of Pōkeno.
- Lloyd Edwin Thorne – of Auckland.
- Ria Moheko Wineera – of Porirua.
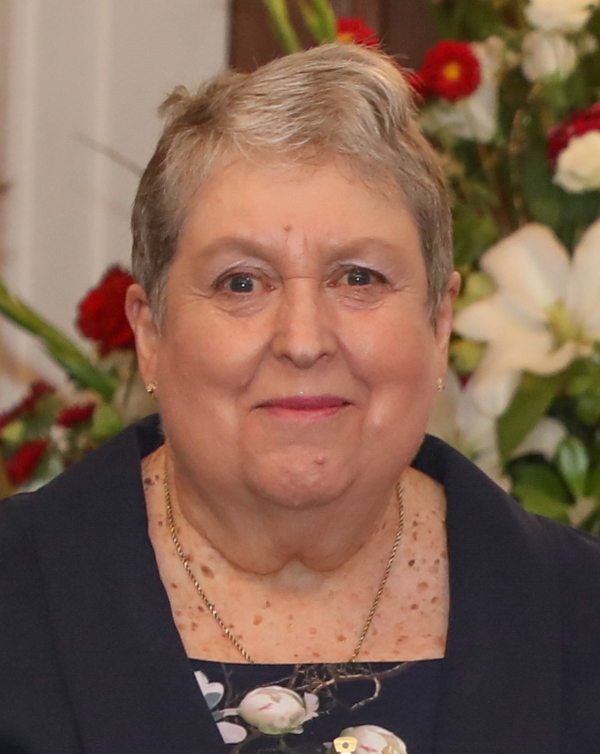
Anne Hawker

=== For public services ===
- Brian Seymour Emannuel Bellringer – of New Plymouth.
- Betty Imelda Black – of Wellington.
- Bruce Robert Borthwick – of Warkworth.
- James William Forde Breeze – of Greymouth.
- Allan Edward Brown – of Gisborne.
- Kevin Raymond Brown – of Greymouth.
- Arthur Ernest Clarke – lately senior constable, New Zealand Police.
- David Graham Conway – of Auckland.
- William Vincent Cowles JP – of Christchurch.
- John Carlton Garrity – of Greytown.
- Norman William Golding – of Puhoi; lately divisional officer, Auckland, New Zealand Fire Service.
- Evan Butler Graham – of Christchurch.
- Kathleen Gladys May Handricks JP – of Auckland.
- Brian John Husband – detective senior sergeant, New Zealand Police.
- Harold James Kelly – of Mangakino.
- George Ngapukapuka Kereama – of Feilding.
- May MacRae Langdon JP – of Christchurch.
- Ivan James Lawson – of Dunedin.
- Graham Eric Selby Lowe – of Havelock North.
- Allan Cedric McLeod – of Lower Hutt; private secretary to the chief justice.
- Donald Vincent Merton – of Upper Hutt; senior conservation officer, Department of Conservation.
- Bruce William Pagan JP – of Bluff.
- Robert Daldy Reese JP – of Hamilton.
- Lewis Gordon Robinson – of Wellington.
- Haydn Ferrars Sherley – of Raumati Beach.
- Yvonne Eileen Trevors – of Tokoroa.
- John Richard Tripp JP – of Dargaville.
- Maurice Carlyon Tryon JP – of Christchurch.
- Libya Walker (Ripia Kireka Waaka) – of Waipukurau.
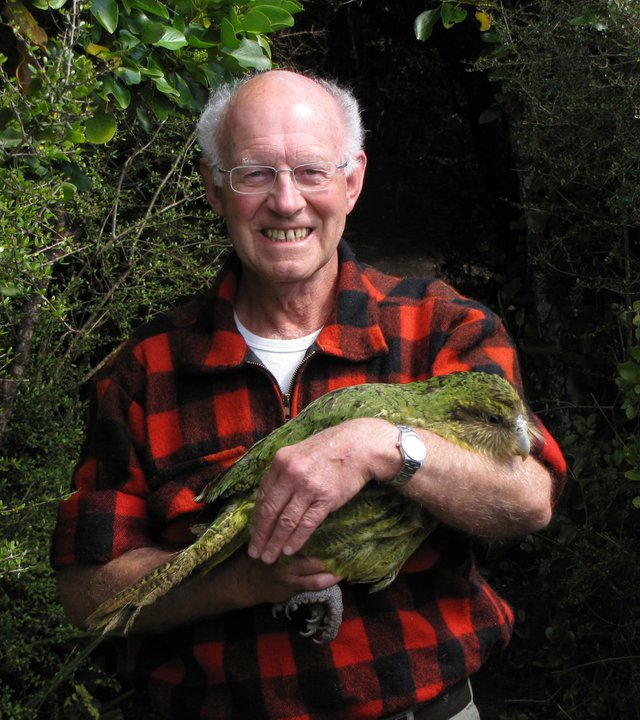
Don Merton

== Queen's Fire Service Medal (QFSM) ==
- Russell George Carlaw – fire commander, Timaru, New Zealand Fire Service.
- Jack Dorsey Clark – chief fire officer, Whakatāne, New Zealand Fire Service.
- George Grant Roberts – fire force commander, No. 2 Region (Hamilton), New Zealand Fire Service.
- Sydney James Roberts – station officer, Waitara Volunteer Fire Brigade, New Zealand Fire Service.

== Queen's Police Medal (QPM) ==
- Francis Colleen Mullins – sergeant, New Zealand Police.

== Queen's Commendation for Valuable Service in the Air ==
- Master Air Electronic Operator Peter Allan Hilliard – Royal New Zealand Air Force.
