= Lin Saunders =

New Zealand teacher, broadcaster (1908–1995)

Linden Charles Mansell Saunders OBE (5 December 1908 – 24 March 1995) was a New Zealand teacher, music critic and broadcaster. He was born in Christchurch, New Zealand, in 1908.

In the 1989 Queen's Birthday Honours, Saunders was appointed an Officer of the Order of the British Empire, for services to music.
