= Hugh Rennie =

New Zealand lawyer and businessman

Sir Hugh Rennie KNZM CBE KC
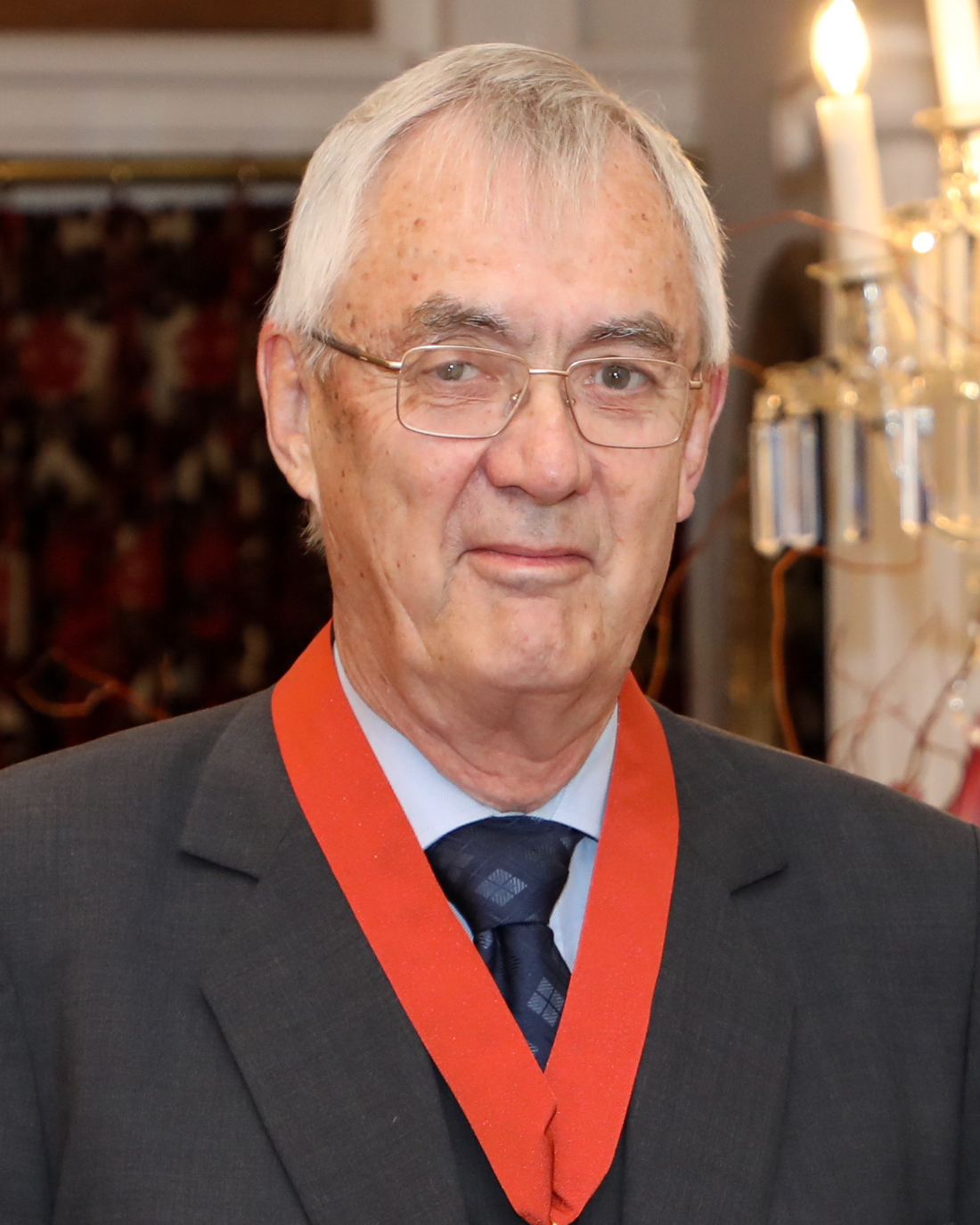
- Rennie in 2022
- Born: Heughan Bassett Rennie; 7 April 1945 (age 79); Whanganui, New Zealand
- Occupations: Lawyer; businessman

Sir Heughan Bassett Rennie KNZM CBE KC (born 7 April 1945) is a New Zealand lawyer and businessman. In the 1989 Queen's Birthday Honours, he was appointed a Commander of the Order of the British Empire, in recognition of his service as chairman of the Broadcasting Corporation of New Zealand between 1984 and 1988. He was made a Queen's Counsel in 1995.

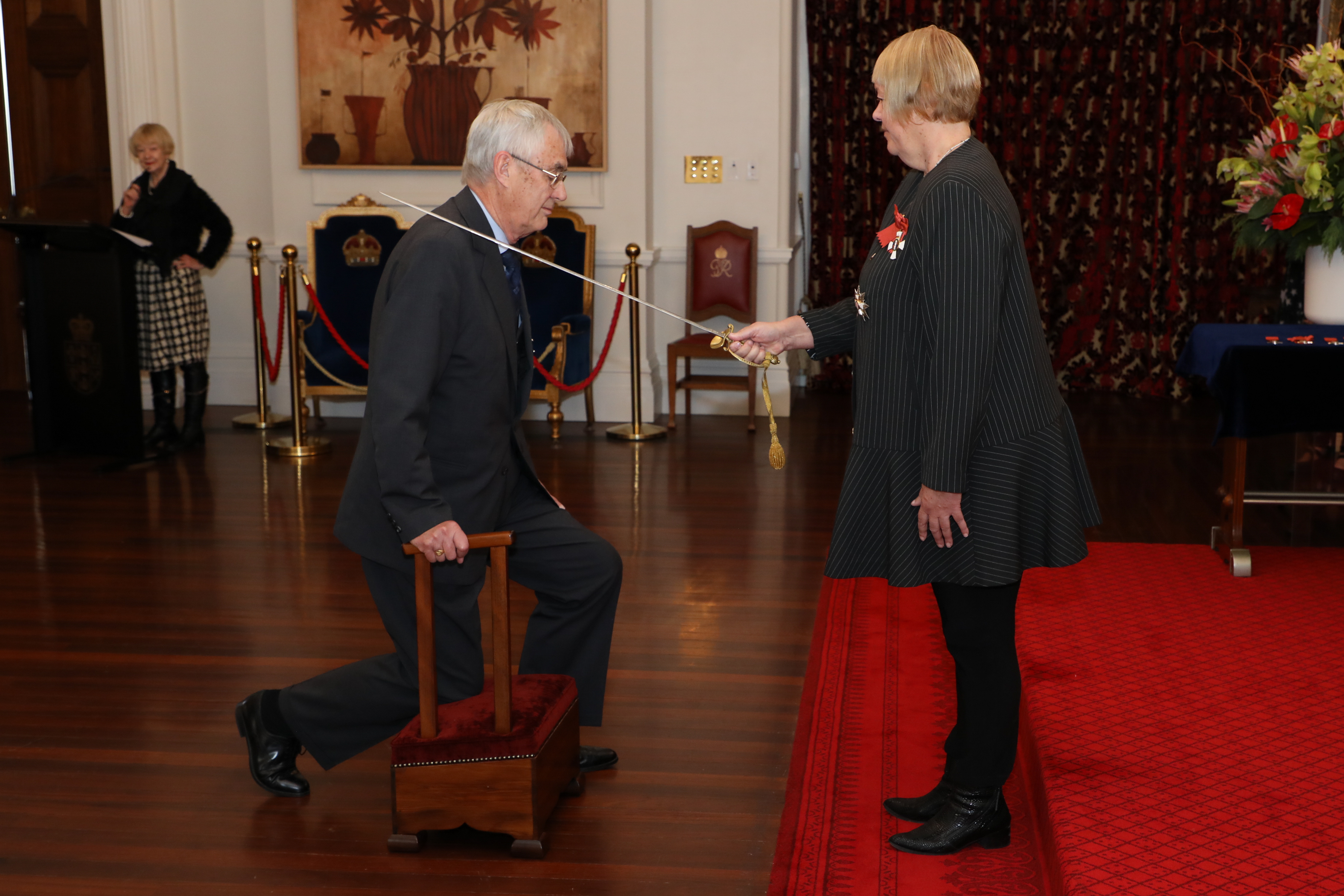
Rennie's investiture as a Knight Companion of the New Zealand Order of Merit by the administrator of the government, Dame Susan Glazebrook, at Government House, Wellington, on 14 September 2022

In the 2022 Queen's Birthday and Platinum Jubilee Honours, Rennie was appointed a Knight Companion of the New Zealand Order of Merit, for services to governance, the law, business and the community.
