= Jenny Pattrick =

New Zealand novelist (born 1936)

- Born: Jennifer Lynette Pattrick; 1936 (age 89–90)
- Occupations: Novelist, jeweller

Jennifer Lynette Pattrick OBE (née Priestley, born 1936) is a New Zealand novelist, known primarily for her historical fiction. Her first novel, The Denniston Rose (2003) and its sequel Heart of Coal (2004) became two of New Zealand's best-selling novels. She has published nine novels, and also writes and publishes songbooks for children. The Denniston Rose has been optioned by Bohemia Group Originals.

Pattrick is a graduate of the International Institute of Modern Letters. In 2009, she was awarded the Katherine Mansfield Menton Fellowship, during which she wrote her sixth novel Inheritance (2010). She was appointed an Officer of the Order of the British Empire, for services to the arts, in the 1989 Queen's Birthday Honours.

Pattrick's novels are often set in New Zealand locations. The Denniston Rose and Heart of Coal centre on coalmining communities on the Denniston plateau from the late 1800s to early 1900s. Landings (2008) is about the Whanganui River at the turn of the twentieth century. Heartland (2014) is set in a fictional town based on the Central Plateau settlement of Rangataua.

Pattrick was a jeweller for 35 years and has had pieces gifted to overseas dignitaries by the New Zealand government.

== Works ==
- The Denniston Rose (Penguin, 2003)
- Heart of Coal (Penguin, 2004)
- Catching the Current (Black Swan, 2005)
- In Touch with Grace (2006)
- Landings (Black Swan, 2008)
- Grace Notes (2009)
- Inheritance (Black Swan, 2010)
- Skylark (2012)
- Heartland (2014)
- Leap of Faith (Penguin, 2017)
- Harbouring (Penguin, 2022)
- Sea Change (Bateman, 2024)
