= Richard Barton =

English settler in New Zealand (1790–1866)

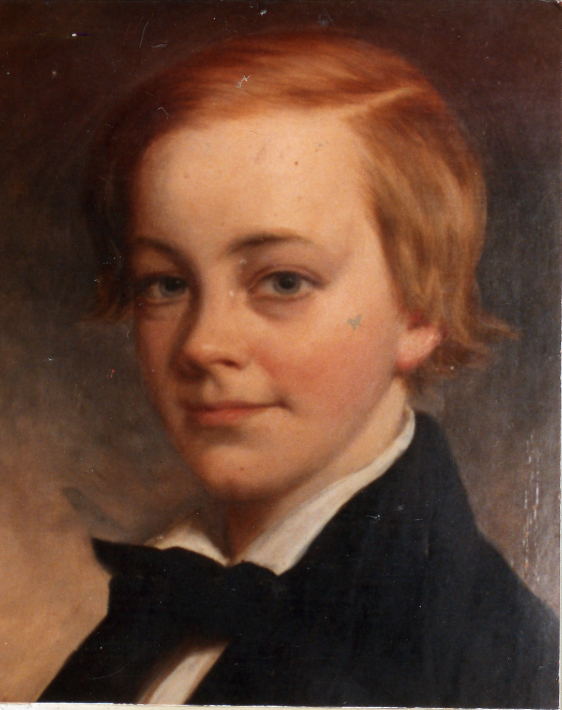
- Richard Barton as a young boy
- Born: 30 August 1790; Newport, Isle of Wight, England
- Died: 20 August 1866 (aged 75); Trentham, New Zealand
- Known for: Early New Zealand settler, Establishment of Trentham

Richard Barton (30 August 1790 – 20 August 1866) was the first European resident of Trentham, Upper Hutt, in New Zealand. He was born in Newport, Isle of Wight, England.

He was a Justice of the Peace and Member of Provincial Council in Wellington during the colonial years of New Zealand, serving alongside other pioneers including William B. Rhodes and during the first term of Henry Bunny in 1864.

== Early life ==
Barton's earliest profession is documented as a farmer near Newport on the Isle of Wight in Hampshire, England. He was qualified in estate management for some years before progressing to Superintendent of Estates for the Duke of Sutherland in Trentham, Staffordshire. He also leased quarries at Brora from the Duke.

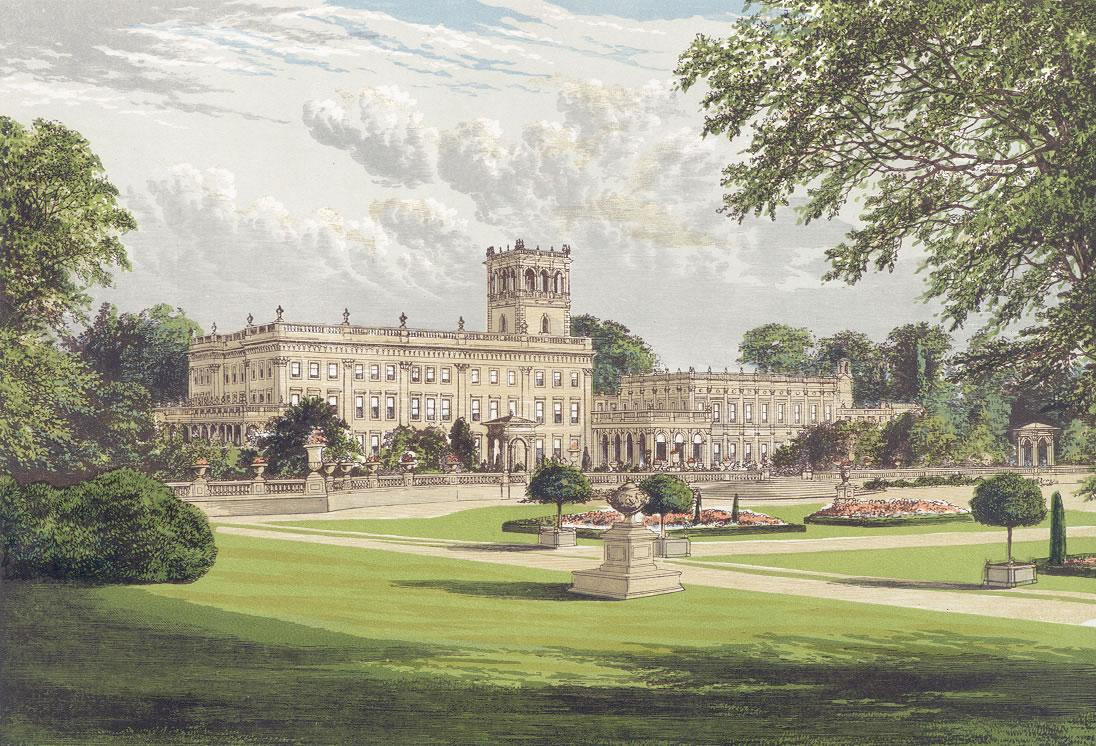
Trentham Hall, where Richard was Superintendent for the Duke of Sutherland

Barton had been Supervisor at Trentham Hall, a large Georgian house commissioned by the 2nd Duke, when he was sponsored, along with a party of younger men under his leadership from this estate, by the Duke of Sutherland to emigrate to New Zealand as a means of relieving overpopulation in the region.

For his work he secured a gift from the Duke for an allotment of a 100-acre section in the new colony of New Zealand.

=== Involvement with the New Zealand Company ===
In 1839, widowed and with a daughter, Barton joined his friend Dudley Sinclair, son of Sir George Sinclair who was a Director of the New Zealand Company, and family on the "Oriental", the first of the New Zealand Company's emigrant vessels to leave England, though the second of four early settler ships to reach Port Nicholson.

An early document from the Morning Chronicle describes the emigrants on board the Oriental in the Departure of the New Zealand Colony:

The emigrants on board the Oriental are of a very superior class. They are chiefly young men and women of from twenty to thirty years of age – the women looking healthy and buxom, the men intelligent and resolute. Here too are a number of Highlanders from the estates of the Duke of Sutherland: they are a fine hardy set of fellows, and capable, no doubt of fighting their way in any region of the world in which they may be placed. Great care appears to have been taken to secure their comfort. They are clad in one uniform dress – a blue jacket and cap, and tartan trousers – everything upon their backs appears to be perfectly new.

Barton became an agent for the New Zealand Company and was responsible for the Highlanders on board the Oriental. Mr. Dudley Sinclair eventually went on to Australia. He enlisted a considerable number of young Highlanders as recruits for the settlement, persuading more than 40 to emigrate. He arranged dances to be held during the winter in the hope of getting the Highlanders married and was able to employ a number of them when they arrived on the ship Blenheim when it arrived in 1841.

== Life in New Zealand ==
He arrived in Port Nicholson, Wellington in 1840 and secured his 100-acres for a farm in the Upper Hutt Valley. He named his estate Trentham in honour of the Duke of Sutherland, one of whose subsidiary titles is Viscount Trentham, of Trentham in the County of Stafford. Much of his former estate is now Trentham Memorial Park, which includes the native bush remnant known as Barton's Bush – the largest remaining area of broadleaf forest in the Hutt Valley.

=== Trentham & Heretaunga ===
Exactly when Barton and his family began living on the Trentham estate is unclear from various historical sources. Although he appears to have built a slab hut on his purchase around 1841, the Trentham Parish histories indicate that he and his third wife, Hannah, whom he married about 1843, only settled on the estate in 1846. During the intervening 5 years it seems Barton may have assisted, perhaps supervised, the surveying the surrounding country for the Wellington Company.

==== The Barton Estate ====
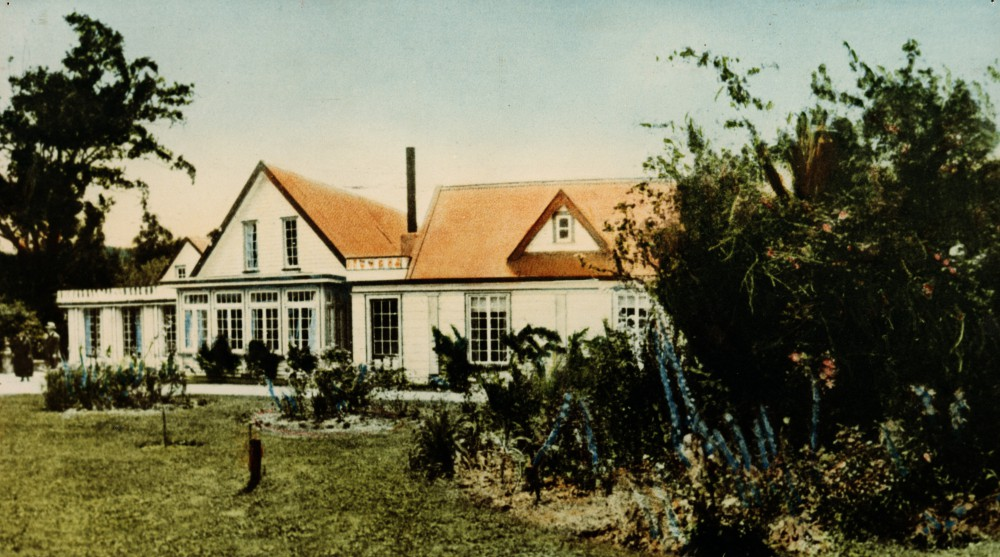
View of the Barton Manor in 1933. Caption underneath reads: "The Manor House, Trentham, home of the Barton family from 1842".

On his estate Barton built one of the first European style houses in the Hutt Valley which was heavily extended throughout the 19th century. It was described as having a sloping roof with long dormer windows.

The Barton homestead was located near the corner of the Main Road (now Fergusson Drive) and Camp Road (now Camp Street) and overlooked what is now Trentham Memorial Park. Barton appears to have acquired more land, as his estate is described as lying to the west of the Main Road from Quinn's Post to Silverstream on both sides of the river.

James Chapman-Taylor visited the estate in 1933 upon invitation of Richard's grandson Wilfred and described his experience:

When Mr Wilfred Barton took me to see the old Home, it still contained family furniture, portraits and records.

But its useful life was over. It was riddled with borer so I was only just in time to make a record of this most interesting and historical old building, and so far as I know there is no other. I suggested that it should be carefully measured and rebuilt in permanent material but the time was the great depression and this made little appeal. So now the romantic old place is gone forever. It was just after the great earthquake of I think 1853 or near that date that the first portion of the (current) house was built. In case there should be another, some heavy timbers were used in the foundation and a whole Birch tree, (its head lopped off) was encased in the structure to hold the house up more safely. Because of possible attack by the Maories, the walls were filled with stones to stop bullets, and only skylights were used till that danger was over. When the settlers were evacuated because of the danger of attack, Mrs Barton refused to go. She had made friends with the Maories and they loved her. However no attack was made and the danger passed. So the little cannon mounted on the verandah was never 'needed. A large amount of white pine (kahikatea) was used in the early part of the building, the danger of borer not being then known. Many of the rafters were large Manuka poles trimmed and straightened The borer did not take them, but the kahikatea was riddled when I saw it, and restoration was hopeless.

I am not able to write a history of the old house, but if one were to be written, my pictures would serve to illustrate it. So much of our early pioneering days and doings is being, lost. It seems a pity.

The following text came from a newspaper interview with Brian Rabbitt :

"The Barton Homestead was a constant reminder of the area's first settler, Richard Barton, when Brian was a lad. It started as a slab in 1841 and was probably added onto. Here it is seen standing in what is now the native bush in Trentham Memorial Park facing Fergusson Drive at the intersection of Camp Road. Mr Rabbit remembers the house being demolished around 1939 (actually 1938).The timber was going to be used to build huts for a Scout Jamboree where General Motors stands today. But war intervened. The Jamboree was never held and the shortage of eggs due to the war led the wood to be used for building fowl houses by farmer Ken Geange."

The house is described in another 'Leader' article, by one of the Scouts who demolished it in 1938; some walls were 20 cm thick, filled with shingle; the kitchen and basement had shingle floors, possibly from a former river bed. Eventually the house had five front doors, half a dozen staircases, 22 rooms and a two-seater outside toilet.

The house was full of borer, and had been abandoned and vandalised for a number of years before being demolished by Scouts for use in a Jamboree; they discovered that all the timber had been pit-sawn and planed by hand, and that walls had not been removed when the various additions were made. In two cases, tree trunks had been left standing, and walls had been built around them."

The Barton family sold 48.5 hectares of the estate in the early 20th century which is now the Royal Wellington Golf Club in Heretaunga. The surrounding suburb of Trentham takes its name from his estate.

=== Establishment of St John's Church ===
By 27 December 1861, Barton is described as the chief landowner and magistrate of the district. This being when arrangements were being made to establish an Anglican church mission at Trentham. Early in 1862 it appears that Barton extended his own house to accommodate the church missionaries as well as donating land for the establishment of a church.

He was chiefly responsible for establishing St John the Evangelist Church, Upper Hutt a category 2 Historic Place and one of the oldest surviving Anglican churches in the Wellington region. Through Richard and his wife, the Trentham Missionary Parochial District was formed in 1861, with John Herring appointed as the first vicar. Barton actively encouraged the establishment of a church in the area, offering a home to Herring and his wife Margaret. It is also generally believed that Barton contributed money to acquire land for the new church.

St John's was completed in 1863 and was consecrated by Bishop C. J. Abraham, the first Bishop of Wellington.

=== Wairarapa ===
On 3 February 1843 Barton is noted as visiting the Wairarapa on one of the earliest European expeditions to explore the Valley. He joined a party led by Samuel Charles Brees, the New Zealand Company's Chief Surveyor (succeeding William Mein Smith in 1842). They were tasked by Wakefield with judging the practicability of carrying a road to the Wairarapa and ascertaining its general character for the extension of the Wellington colony. They were joined by Hugh and John Cameron, and Chief Taringa Kuri alongside 4 Maori guides.

They described the valley as consisting of "quite sufficient land fit for arable purposes to support settlers", which resulted in more expeditions over the year. Barton revisited the district swiftly with his peers William Vavasour, William Molesworth and Henry Petre, with the purpose of prospecting for grazing.

It is understood that in later years, Barton took up land in the Wairarapa for further farming establishing a sheep station at White Rock around 1847 and afterwards extended his holdings. A topographic map from 1853 shows Barton had taken up land across Cape Palliser which bordered the runs of the Riddiford and Pharazyn families.

There is still a stone fence along Waitutuma Stream of European origin having been built by Barton of White Rock Station

== Public service in New Zealand ==
Barton was a noted justice of the peace in the Hutt District. In 1861 at the age of 71 he ran for Provincial Council representing the Hutt District, his public address was shared in the Wellington Independent paper:

GENTLEMEN.— I have been asked by a great many Electors both in my own immediate neighbourhood, and also in the Lower Valley, to offer myself as one of your representatives in the Provincial Council. I will be very candid, with you and frankly state, that, whilst I am sensible of this mark of confidence, yet I am reluctant, at my time of life, to add to the many claims I already have on my time. This reluctance I have only been induced to overcome, upon being convinced, that it is left to me to perform a public duty, which other younger men have declined. I, in common with a great many other Electors, have felt the injuries which have been inflicted on this Province during the last 3 or 4 years, by the conflict that has been perpetuated between the Legislature and Executive. We have sought, and at length succeeded in obtaining a constitutional release from this deadlock; .... As one of your oldest resident settlers, I necessarily take a great interest in the Hutt; and shall not fail to watch especially its local interests, and endeavour to obtain for our district its fair share of the public expenditure.

I have the honor to be, Gentlemen, Your obedient servant,

RICHARD BARTON

He was a member of the Wellington Provincial Council in 1864 alongside William B. Rhodes and Henry Bunny. This term resulted in council agreement to build a Custom House and Post Offices on reclaimed land at Lambton Quay.

== Marriage and children ==
Richard Barton married Hannah Butler on 21 September 1843, in a Native Church in Petone. She was the daughter of the Reverend John Gare Butler, one of the earliest missionaries to serve in New Zealand. Together they had 3 children:

- Richard John Barton (Trentham, 4 July 1846 – 1879) run-holder at White Rock, died at the 33 years of age, his brothers taking over the run. Built Fernside in Featherston after marrying Catherine Bidwill (eldest daughter of Charles Robert Bidwill of Pihautea another pioneer run-holder in Wairarapa)
- John Barton (Trentham, 8 October 1850 – 2 January 1923), whose son Richard John Barton II married Georgina Hector (daughter of Sir James Hector) and was the New Zealand run-holder, pastoralist and author.
- William Barton born (Trentham, 1 August 1858 – February 1938)

It is also understood he married prior to arriving in New Zealand but was widowed and had a daughter, Mary from this union.

== Death ==
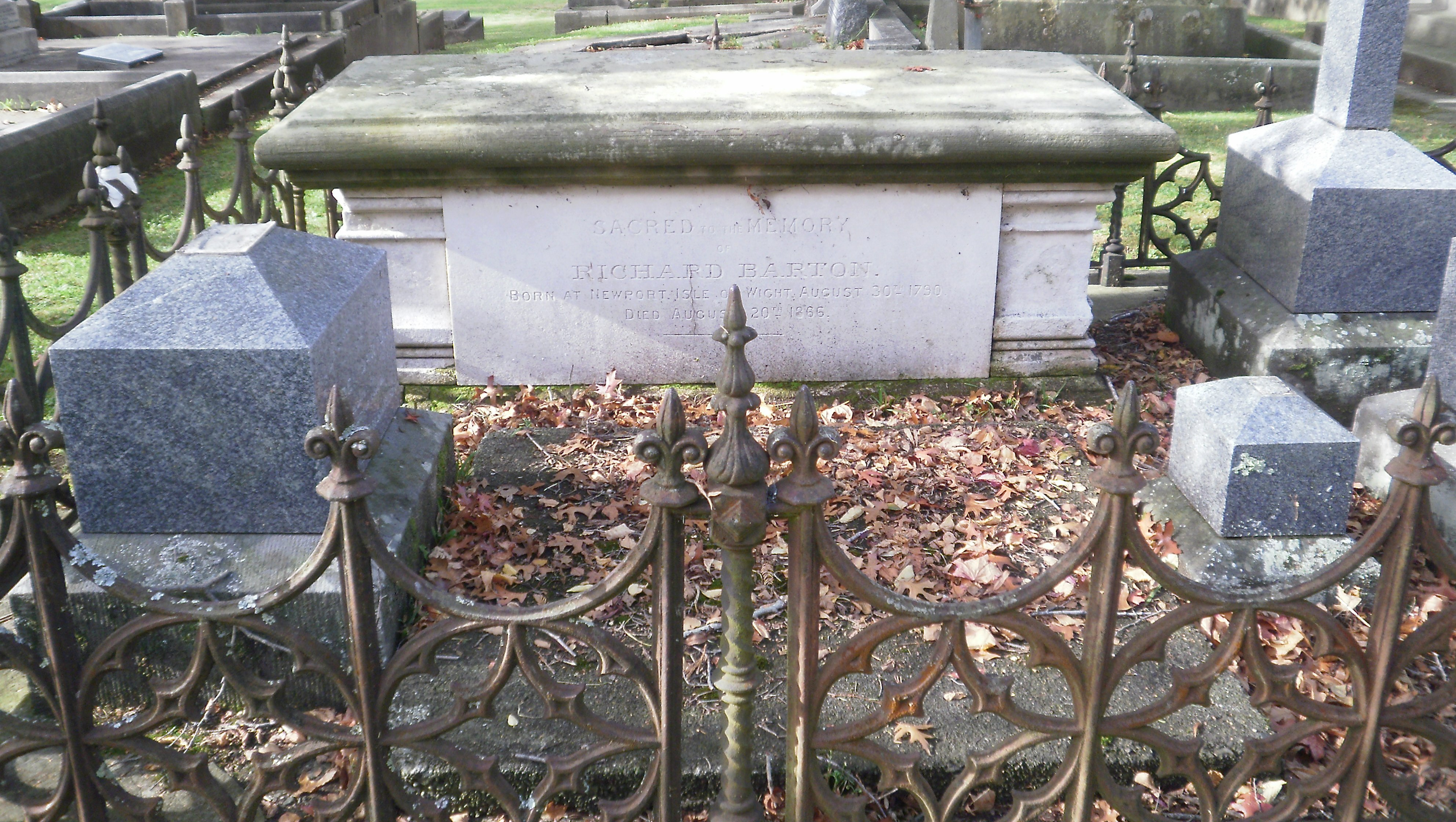
Richard Barton's Grave at St John's Church, Trentham

Richard Barton died on 20 August 1866 and was survived by his wife Hannah Barton, three sons and daughter.

He was buried in Trentham Upper Hutt at St John's Anglican Church cemetery where he was a founding father of the church and memorials to him in the form of brass plaques within the Church building are still kept.

The Barton family also holds a plot in St Johns Church for Richard Barton's descendants.
