= Denford McDonald =

New Zealand businessman (1929–2020)

Denford McDonald OBE
- Born: Denford Coll McDonald; 9 April 1929; Tapanui, New Zealand
- Died: 1 February 2020 (aged 90); Wellington, New Zealand

Denford Coll McDonald OBE (9 April 1929 – 1 February 2020) was a New Zealand mechanical engineer and businessman most closely associated with the motor vehicle industry. He was chief executive officer and then chair of Mitsubishi New Zealand.

== Biography ==
Born in the small Otago town of Tapanui on 9 April 1929, McDonald was the son of Ada McDonald (née Denford) and James Charles Alexander McDonald. He was educated at Southland Boys' High School, before studying mechanical engineering at Canterbury University College, and graduating Bachelor of Engineering in 1952.

McDonald joined Todd Motors as a graduate trainee engineer in 1952, and rose to become general manager in 1984. In 1987, Todd Motors was sold to Mitsubishi Motors, and McDonald became the chief executive officer of Mitsubishi New Zealand. In 1995, he was appointed as chairman of Mitsubishi New Zealand.

Other corporate and governance roles undertaken by McDonald include being on the boards of the New Zealand Standards Council, Energy Direct and Television New Zealand, and as deputy chairman of the New Zealand Qualifications Authority. He also was chair of the Wellington Institute of Technology council, and the student hub at that institution, opened in 2009, was named in McDonald's honour.

In the 1989 Queen's Birthday Honours, McDonald was appointed an Officer of the Order of the British Empire, for services to the motor vehicle industry. He was also a Fellow of the New Zealand Institute of Management.

McDonald died at this home in Wellington on 1 February 2020.
