= Arthur Campbell (chemist) =

New Zealand analytical chemist (1925–2020)

Arthur Campbell OBE
- Born: Arthur Derek Campbell; 27 May 1925; Waimate, New Zealand
- Died: 20 December 2020 (aged 95); Dunedin, New Zealand
- Education: University of Otago
- Spouse: Ruth Florence Smith (m. 1950; died 2019)
- Children: 3
- Scientific career
- Fields: Organic microanalysis
- Workplaces: University of Otago
- Thesis: Some applications of acrylonitrile (1952)

Arthur Derek Campbell OBE (27 May 1925 – 20 December 2020) was a New Zealand analytical chemist. He was a faculty member in the Department of Chemistry at the University of Otago from 1948 to 1988, becoming a professor emeritus on his retirement.

== Early life and education ==
Campbell was born in Waimate on 27 May 1925, the son of Mona Sevicke Campbell (née Jones) and David Brown Campbell. He was educated at Waimate High School, and then proceeded to study chemistry at the University of Otago, graduating Master of Science with second-class honours in 1948, and PhD in 1953. His doctoral thesis was titled Some applications of acrylonitrile.

In 1950, Campbell married Ruth Florence Smith, and the couple went on to have three children.

== Academic and research career ==
Campbell was a faculty member in the Department of Chemistry at the University of Otago from 1948 to 1988. He was appointed as an assistant lecturer in 1948, rising to become a professor in 1971, and the Mellor Professor of Chemistry in 1983. He served as a member of the University Council from 1963 to 1971, dean of the Faculty of Science from 1980 to 1982, and head of the Department of Chemistry from 1983 to 1988. When he retired in 1988, he was conferred the title of professor emeritus.

Campbell's early research centred on carboxylic acid derivatives. However, he became interested in organic microanalysis, and developed many analytical procedures, and improved techniques for analysing perfluorinated organic compounds. Campbell served as chair of the Chemical Testing Registration Advisory Committee of the Testing Laboratory Registration Council of New Zealand from 1973 to 1985. Internationally, he was a Bureau Member of the International Union of Pure and Applied Chemistry from 1981 to 1989. The University of Otago's Campbell Microanalytical Laboratory is named in his honour.

Between 1979 and 1980, Campbell was president of the New Zealand Institute of Chemistry.

== Later life and death ==
Campbell's wife, Ruth, died in Dunedin on 18 March 2019. Campbell died in Dunedin on 20 December 2020.

== Honours and awards ==
In the 1989 Queen's Birthday Honours, Campbell was appointed an Officer of the Order of the British Empire, for services to science.
