= Whawanui River =

- Route of the Whawanui River
- Mouth of the Whawanui River Whawanui River (North Island)
- Native name: Whawanui (Māori)

Location
- Country: New Zealand
- Island: North Island
- Region: Wellington
- District: South Wairarapa

Physical characteristics
- Source: Aorangi Range
  - coordinates: 41.4531°S 175.4286°E
  - elevation: 807 m (2,648 ft)
- Mouth: Pacific Ocean
  - location: White Rock Station
  - coordinates: 41°33′53″S 175°25′26″E
  - elevation: Sea level
- Length: 13 km (8.1 mi)

Basin features
- Progression: Whawanui River → Pacific Ocean
- Bridges: White Rock Road Bridge

The Whawanui River is a river of the Wellington Region of New Zealand's North Island. It flows south from the Aorangi Range to reach the Pacific Ocean 10 kilometres (6 mi) northeast of Cape Palliser. It is one of the southernmost rivers in the North Island.

The river reaches the sea close to White Rock, which is formed of calcilutite in a Paleocene limestone. Richard Barton set up White Rock as a sheep station in 1847. Banded dotterel nest near the beach.

== See also ==
- List of rivers of Wellington Region
- List of rivers of New Zealand
