= Matt Te Pou (rugby union coach) =

New Zealand Māori leader, rugby union coach and soldier

Matthew John Te Pou MNZM MBE BEM is a New Zealand Māori leader and former rugby union coach and soldier.

Te Pou served in the New Zealand Army for 23 years, including active service in Vietnam, and was an instructor at the Royal Military College, Duntroon in Australia for three years. He was coach of the Māori All Blacks for 11 years until 2005. Te Pou is chair of the Tūhoe Fisheries Charitable Trust, and was a negotiator representing eight iwi in the Central North Island forestry settlement.

In the 1982 Queen's Birthday Honours, Te Pou was awarded the British Empire Medal (military division). In the 1989 Queen's Birthday Honours, he was made a Member of the Military Division of the Order of the British Empire, and he was appointed a Member of the New Zealand Order of Merit, for services to rugby, in the 2006 New Year Honours.

Te Pou's son, also called Matt Te Pou, played international rugby for Tonga.
