= Peter Button =

New Zealand aviator (1929–1987)

Peter Button

Peter Thomas Button OBE QGM (9 October 1929 – 20 November 1987) was a pioneering rescue helicopter pilot in Wellington, New Zealand.

== Career ==
Button established the firm Capital Helicopters in 1975 and made his aircraft available for use in emergencies. He was a witness to the sinking of the inter-island ferry TEV Wahine in 1968, and is thought to have had the idea of a rescue helicopter service as a result of this experience. The hilly terrain of Wellington means that helicopters are often used for building and arboriculture work due to the difficulty of site access, which meant that the pilots at Capital Helicopters were particularly skilled in precision flying, and thus suited to rescue work. Thanks to a sponsorship deal in the early eighties Button was able to dedicate one of his helicopters solely to rescues. Since Button established the service there has been a rescue helicopter service in Wellington, for most of that period under the name of the Westpac Rescue Helicopter.

In the 1982 Queen's Birthday Honours, Button was appointed an Officer of the Order of the British Empire, for services to search and rescue operations.

In 1984 Button contested the Island Bay electorate for the New Zealand Party. He finished third out of six candidates, winning 20.4% of the vote.

== Lady Elizabeth II rescue ==
On 2 July 1986, the police launch Lady Elizabeth II capsized in heavy seas at the entrance to Wellington Harbour whilst on a training mission. Despite the appalling conditions Button and his son Clive managed to save two of the four crew members, skipper Constable Jim McLean and crew member Constable Rod Heard. Crew members Constable Glen Hughes and Senior Sergeant Phil Ward both died in the accident. A photograph of the rescue shows his helicopter hovering in the troughs with its rotors below the peaks of the oncoming waves, estimated to be 10 m (33 ft) high. As a result of his actions Peter Button attained the status of a hero in Wellington, and was known by the nickname 'Saint Peter'. On 18 November 1987, Governor General Paul Reeves awarded Button the Queen's Gallantry Medal for his part in the rescue of the crew from the Lady Elizabeth II.

Shortly after the Lady Elizabeth II rescue it was announced that a tender for the provision of helicopter services to the local harbour authority, which wished to fly harbour pilots out to ships before they reached the harbour entrance, had gone to a rival firm. The future of Capital Helicopters was placed in jeopardy as a result of the firm's failure to win this contract, and there was a public outcry that Button's efforts were not being recognised by a body that was often reliant on his volunteer efforts.

== Death ==
On 20 November 1987, two days after receiving his Queen's Gallantry Medal, Button was piloting Bell JetRanger ZK-HKF on a flight with local photographer Ronald Woolf and property developer Dion Savage. Police called in the helicopter to assist tracking Peter Carr, an offender who had escaped from Rimutaka Prison. During the search Button's helicopter drifted into high voltage transmission lines, lost both rotor blades, and crashed in Churton Park killing all three on board. Ironically Button had been the helicopter pilot who assisted when the lines were first built. The crash also cut power to much of the Wellington Metropolitan area for several hours.

At Button's funeral on 25 November, 13 helicopters paid tribute with a flyby. A few years after his death a street in Johnsonville, Peter Button Place, was named in his honour.
