= Matt Te Pou (rugby union player) =

Tonga international rugby union player

- Born: Matthew John Kenneth Te Pou; 27 August 1973 (age 53) Waiouru, New Zealand
- Height: 6 ft 4 in (193 cm)
- Weight: 228 lb (103 kg)
- Notable relative: Matt Te Pou (father)

Rugby union career
- Position: Flanker
Amateur team(s)
Years	Team	Apps	(Points)
1996-1998	Waihou		
–	Otorohanga		
–	Taupo United		
Provincial / State sides
Years	Team	Apps	(Points)
1996	Thames Valley	9	(0)
1997–1998	King Country	15	(5)
1999–2002	Gauteng Falcons		
International career
Years	Team	Apps	(Points)
1996	New Zealand Maori	1	(0)
1998–2002	Tonga	13	(5)

Matthew John Kenneth Te Pou (born Waiouru, on 27 August 1973) is a New Zealand former rugby union player. He played for Tonga. He is of Māori descent. His father, also called Matt Te Pou, was a coach of the Maori All Blacks in 2005.

== Career ==
Te Pou first played for Tonga in 1998 against Australia, in Canberra on 22 September 1998. He was part of the 1999 Rugby World Cup 'Ikale Tahi squad coached by Polutele Tu'ihalamaka, playing two matches in the tournament against the New Zealand and Italy. His last cap for Tonga was against Fiji in Nuku'alofa, on 7 June 2002. He played the National Provincial Championship for Thames Valley, King Country, as well in the Currie Cup, playing for the Gauteng Falcons.
