= Heretaunga, Upper Hutt =

Suburb of Upper Hutt City, New Zealand

Heretaunga
- Suburb
- Interactive map of Heretaunga
- Coordinates: 41.143°S 175.020°E
- Country: New Zealand
- Region: Wellington Region
- Territorial authority: Upper Hutt
- Established: 1840s
- Electorates: Remutaka; Ikaroa-Rāwhiti (Māori)

Government
  - Territorial Authority: Upper Hutt City Council
  - Regional council: Greater Wellington Regional Council
  - Mayor of Upper Hutt: Peri Zee
  - Remutaka MP: Chris Hipkins
  - Ikaroa-Rāwhiti MP: Cushla Tangaere-Manuel

Area
  - Total: 3.26 km^{2} (1.26 sq mi)

Population (June 2025)
  - Total: 2,450
  - Density: 752/km^{2} (1,950/sq mi)

Heretaunga is a suburb of the city of Upper Hutt, located in the lower (southern) North Island of New Zealand. Heretaunga adjoins the suburb of Silverstream to its southwest and the two are commonly thought of associated with each other. To the northeast lies Trentham. The Heretaunga Railway Station on the Hutt Valley Line serves the suburb.

Heretaunga takes its name from one of the Māori names for the nearby Hutt River, originating from a Hawke's Bay district. Heretaunga as a Māori name combines here, meaning "to tie up", and Tauranga, literally meaning "to be at home" - the name originated with a mooring place for canoes.

The settlement, one of the older suburbs in the Hutt Valley, dates from the 1840s when European settlers sought country sections. A prime example of a "leafy" suburb, Heretaunga includes quiet tree-lined streets. It is characterised by large houses, often Edwardian or from the mid-20th century.

The suburb has numerous green spaces, most evident around the site of the Royal Wellington Wellington Golf Club and Trentham Memorial Park. The Royal Wellington Golf Club has been based in Heretaunga since 20 November 1906 after acquiring 48.5 hectares of land from the Barton family (descendants of Richard Barton).

The Mawaihakona Stream begins at a spring in Trentham Memorial Park and drains the western side of the Hutt Valley from Trentham to Heretaunga. The stream passes around Heretaunga Park and the perimeter of the playing fields of St Patrick's College, Silverstream. It flows into the Hutt River north of the Silverstream bridge.

== Demographics ==
Heretaunga's statistical area covers 3.26 km^{2} (1.26 sq mi). It had an estimated population of 2,450 as of June 2025, with a population density of 752 people per km^{2}.

Historical population
Year	Pop.	±% p.a.
2006	2,223	—
2013	2,199	−0.15%
2018	2,496	+2.57%
2023	2,424	−0.58%

Heretaunga had a population of 2,424 in the 2023 New Zealand census, a decrease of 72 people (−2.9%) since the 2018 census, and an increase of 225 people (10.2%) since the 2013 census. There were 1,179 males, 1,236 females, and 9 people of other genders in 921 dwellings. 3.7% of people identified as LGBTIQ+. The median age was 41.7 years (compared with 38.1 years nationally). There were 459 people (18.9%) aged under 15 years, 381 (15.7%) aged 15 to 29, 1,086 (44.8%) aged 30 to 64, and 501 (20.7%) aged 65 or older.

People could identify as more than one ethnicity. The results were 79.0% European (Pākehā); 12.1% Māori; 7.3% Pasifika; 12.6% Asian; 1.4% Middle Eastern, Latin American and African New Zealanders (MELAA); and 2.8% other, which includes people giving their ethnicity as "New Zealander". English was spoken by 96.3%, Māori by 3.2%, Samoan by 2.4%, and other languages by 15.1%. No language could be spoken by 2.0% (e.g. too young to talk). New Zealand Sign Language was known by 0.4%. The percentage of people born overseas was 24.3, compared with 28.8% nationally.

Religious affiliations were 43.1% Christian, 2.6% Hindu, 0.5% Islam, 0.4% Māori religious beliefs, 0.5% Buddhist, 0.4% New Age, 0.1% Jewish, and 1.5% other religions. People who answered that they had no religion were 44.4%, and 6.6% of people did not answer the census question.

Of those at least 15 years old, 591 (30.1%) people had a bachelor's or higher degree, 984 (50.1%) had a post-high school certificate or diploma, and 402 (20.5%) people exclusively held high school qualifications. The median income was $48,700, compared with $41,500 nationally. 375 people (19.1%) earned over $100,000 compared to 12.1% nationally. The employment status of those at least 15 was 1,044 (53.1%) full-time, 231 (11.8%) part-time, and 51 (2.6%) unemployed.

== Education ==
St Brendan's School is a co-educational state-integrated Catholic primary school for Year 1 to 8 students, with a roll of 277 as of July 2026. It opened in 1961.
