= John Gare Butler =

English missionary to New Zealand (1781–1841)

- Born: March 1781
- Died: 18 June 1841 (aged 60); Gear Island, Petone, New Zealand
- Occupations: Anglican Minister and Missionary
- Spouse: Hannah Hitchman (married 1798)

John Gare Butler (March 1781 – 18 June 1841) was the first ordained clergyman to reside in New Zealand with the Church Missionary Society (CMS). In 1818 he was ordained as a priest by the Bishop of Gloucester. Butler and the Māori workers at the mission at Kerikeri established a small mixed farm, which involved the first use in New Zealand of an agricultural plough, which was pulled by team of six bullocks. Butler arranged for the building of Mission House in Kerikeri.

== Church Missionary Society mission in New Zealand ==
In 1818 he was appointed by the CMS Committee in London to the position of superintendent of the CMS mission in the Bay of Islands, New Zealand, while being subordinate to the Rev. Samuel Marsden, the CMS's Agent in New South Wales, Australia. Disputes arose between Butler and Marsden, such as, when Marsden refusing to honour a payment draft for timber, purchased for the mission by Butler, and also when goods were retained in Sydney and not sent to the mission in the Bay of Islands. In 1822 he wrote letters of complaint to Marsden and Revd. Josiah Pratt, the secretary of the CMS in London. The disputes continued into 1823, by correspondence and during Marsden's visit to the Bay of Islands.

On 13 January 1824, Marsden suspended Butler from his position.

== Return to England ==
On 10 July 1824 Butler, his wife and their daughter Hannah, sailed on the Midas for England. The records of the CMS in London noted that Butler withdrew from the CMS on 16 February 1825. His son, Samuel Butler, remained in New Zealand, engaging in the flax trade in Hokianga, until his death by drowning in 1836.

In 1828 Butler published through G. R. Gittore, of Bridgenorth, an edition of Psalms and hymns, "Abridged, arranged and adapted to Public Worship, selected from the best authors." From 1825 to 1839 he was appointed as the clergyman of various parishes in England, such as, in 1836 to the parish of Haddenham, Isle of Ely.

== Return to New Zealand ==
On the 20 April 1840 he arrived at Port Nicholson, Wellington on a New Zealand Land Company ship, the Bolton. Butler was appointed to a parish at Petone and he was a Māori welfare agent until he fell ill in March 1841; and his death followed on 18 June 1841.
