= Tauwharenīkau =

Rural locality in the Wellington Region, New Zealand

- Locality
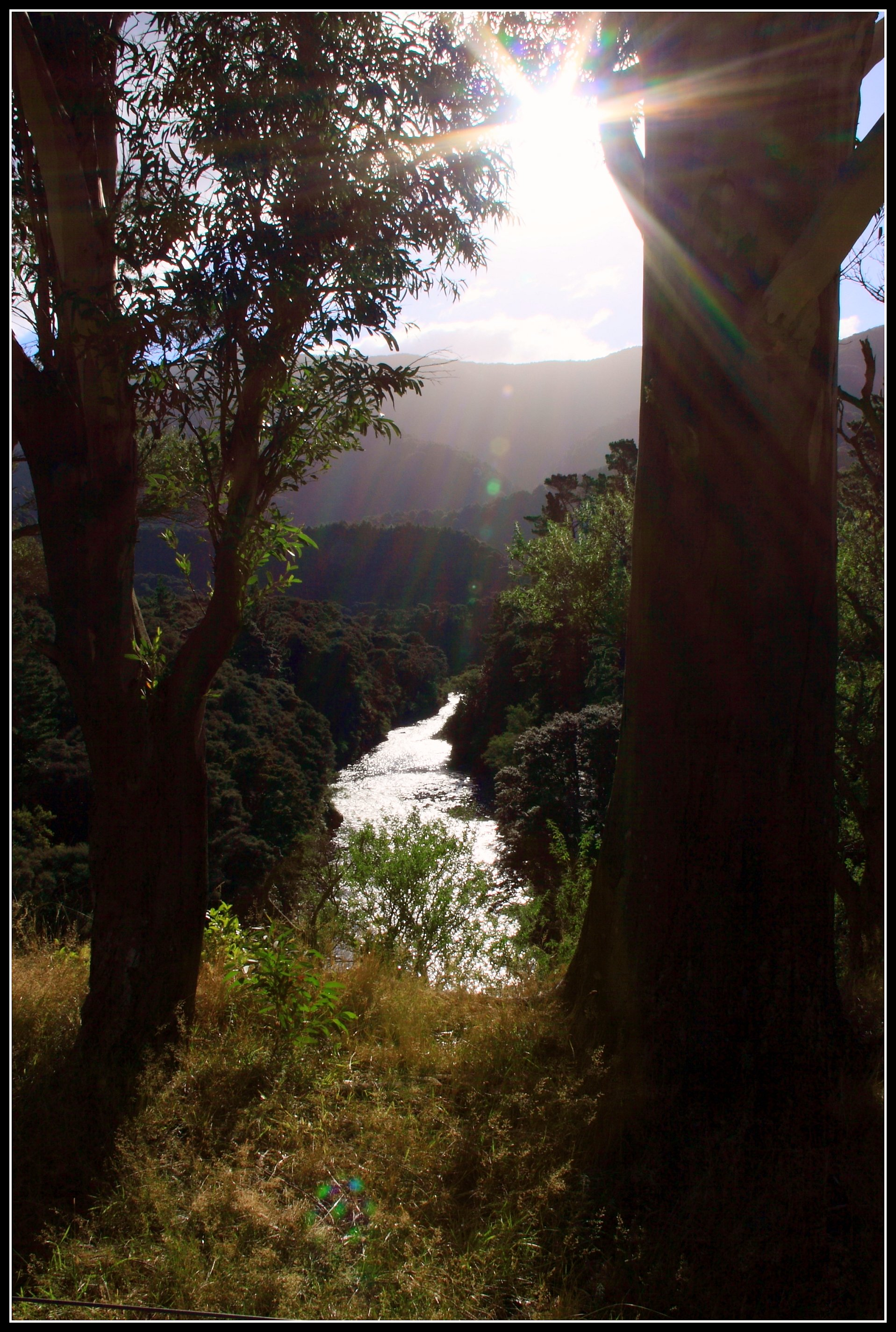
- Tauherenikau River
- Interactive map of Tauwharenīkau
- Coordinates: 41.114°S 175.389°E
- Region: Wellington Region
- Territorial authority: South Wairarapa District
- Ward: Featherston Ward; Greytown Ward
- Community: Featherston Community; Greytown Community
- Electorates: Wairarapa; Ikaroa-Rāwhiti (Māori)

Government
  - Territorial Authority: South Wairarapa District Council
  - Regional council: Greater Wellington Regional Council
  - Mayor of South Wairarapa: Fran Wilde
  - Wairarapa MP: Mike Butterick
  - Ikaroa-Rāwhiti MP: Cushla Tangaere-Manuel

Area
  - Total: 69.51 km^{2} (26.84 sq mi)

Population (2023 Census)
  - Total: 549
  - Density: 7.90/km^{2} (20.5/sq mi)

Tauwharenīkau is a rural locality and a statistical area in the South Wairarapa District and Wellington Region of New Zealand's North Island. The locality is on SH 2 about 5 km east of Featherston and 7 km southwest of Greytown by road, and the statistical area covers the Tauwharenīkau River valley and plain north of SH 53. The statistical area surrounds but does not include Greytown.

The name Tauwharenīkau, spelt Tauherenikau until 2023, means "the house made of nīkau palm fronds".

Tauherenikau Racecourse opened in 1874.

Tauherenikau School operated from 1878 to 1936. It closed as the roll had dwindled to five students. The peak roll was 46 in 1917.

Fernside Homestead is a large wooden house built in 1924 on the west side of the river near Tauwharenikau.

== Demographics ==
Tauwharenīkau locality covers 69.51 km^{2} (26.84 sq mi). It is part of the larger Tauherenikau statistical area.

Historical population for Tauwharenīkau locality
Year	Pop.	±% p.a.
2006	372	—
2013	438	+2.36%
2018	465	+1.20%
2023	549	+3.38%

Tauwharenīkau had a population of 549 in the 2023 New Zealand census, an increase of 84 people (18.1%) since the 2018 census, and an increase of 111 people (25.3%) since the 2013 census. There were 273 males and 276 females in 225 dwellings. 3.8% of people identified as LGBTIQ+. There were 87 people (15.8%) aged under 15 years, 75 (13.7%) aged 15 to 29, 285 (51.9%) aged 30 to 64, and 99 (18.0%) aged 65 or older.

People could identify as more than one ethnicity. The results were 90.7% European (Pākehā); 12.0% Māori; 1.6% Pasifika; 6.0% Asian; 0.5% Middle Eastern, Latin American and African New Zealanders (MELAA); and 2.2% other, which includes people giving their ethnicity as "New Zealander". English was spoken by 96.2%, Māori by 1.6%, and other languages by 10.9%. No language could be spoken by 2.7% (e.g. too young to talk). The percentage of people born overseas was 23.5, compared with 28.8% nationally.

Religious affiliations were 29.0% Christian, 0.5% Hindu, 0.5% Islam, 1.1% Buddhist, 1.1% New Age, and 1.1% other religions. People who answered that they had no religion were 56.8%, and 9.8% of people did not answer the census question.

Of those at least 15 years old, 138 (29.9%) people had a bachelor's or higher degree, 249 (53.9%) had a post-high school certificate or diploma, and 78 (16.9%) people exclusively held high school qualifications. 96 people (20.8%) earned over $100,000 compared to 12.1% nationally. The employment status of those at least 15 was 255 (55.2%) full-time, 78 (16.9%) part-time, and 6 (1.3%) unemployed.

=== Tauherenikau statistical area ===
Tauherenikau statistical area covers 337.66 km^{2} (130.37 sq mi) and had an estimated population of 1,660 as of June 2025, with a population density of 4.9 people per km^{2}.

Historical population for Tauherenikau statistical area
Year	Pop.	±% p.a.
2006	972	—
2013	1,221	+3.31%
2018	1,353	+2.07%
2023	1,602	+3.44%

The statistical area had a population of 1,602 in the 2023 New Zealand census, an increase of 249 people (18.4%) since the 2018 census, and an increase of 381 people (31.2%) since the 2013 census. There were 789 males, 810 females, and 3 people of other genders in 618 dwellings. 4.1% of people identified as LGBTIQ+. The median age was 47.7 years (compared with 38.1 years nationally). There were 267 people (16.7%) aged under 15 years, 225 (14.0%) aged 15 to 29, 810 (50.6%) aged 30 to 64, and 300 (18.7%) aged 65 or older.

People could identify as more than one ethnicity. The results were 90.6% European (Pākehā); 11.8% Māori; 3.4% Pasifika; 3.2% Asian; 0.7% Middle Eastern, Latin American and African New Zealanders (MELAA); and 3.0% other, which includes people giving their ethnicity as "New Zealander". English was spoken by 96.8%, Māori by 2.4%, Samoan by 1.7%, and other languages by 8.4%. No language could be spoken by 1.9% (e.g. too young to talk). New Zealand Sign Language was known by 0.2%. The percentage of people born overseas was 23.4, compared with 28.8% nationally.

Religious affiliations were 30.5% Christian, 0.2% Hindu, 0.2% Islam, 0.4% Māori religious beliefs, 0.6% Buddhist, 0.6% New Age, 0.2% Jewish, and 0.9% other religions. People who answered that they had no religion were 57.1%, and 9.4% of people did not answer the census question.

Of those at least 15 years old, 417 (31.2%) people had a bachelor's or higher degree, 666 (49.9%) had a post-high school certificate or diploma, and 252 (18.9%) people exclusively held high school qualifications. The median income was $43,800, compared with $41,500 nationally. 267 people (20.0%) earned over $100,000 compared to 12.1% nationally. The employment status of those at least 15 was 717 (53.7%) full-time, 249 (18.7%) part-time, and 18 (1.3%) unemployed.

== Climate ==
Climate data for Tauwharenikau (1981–2010)
Month	Jan	Feb	Mar	Apr	May	Jun	Jul	Aug	Sep	Oct	Nov	Dec	Year
Mean daily maximum °C (°F)	23.6 (74.5)	23.6 (74.5)	21.7 (71.1)	18.6 (65.5)	15.8 (60.4)	13.4 (56.1)	12.6 (54.7)	13.4 (56.1)	15.4 (59.7)	17.2 (63.0)	19.2 (66.6)	21.4 (70.5)	18.0 (64.4)
Daily mean °C (°F)	17.8 (64.0)	17.7 (63.9)	16.1 (61.0)	13.3 (55.9)	10.9 (51.6)	8.9 (48.0)	8.2 (46.8)	8.8 (47.8)	10.6 (51.1)	12.2 (54.0)	13.8 (56.8)	16.2 (61.2)	12.9 (55.2)
Mean daily minimum °C (°F)	12.0 (53.6)	11.9 (53.4)	10.5 (50.9)	7.9 (46.2)	6.0 (42.8)	4.4 (39.9)	3.8 (38.8)	4.2 (39.6)	5.7 (42.3)	7.3 (45.1)	8.5 (47.3)	11.0 (51.8)	7.8 (46.0)
Average rainfall mm (inches)	45.2 (1.78)	87.6 (3.45)	88.1 (3.47)	74.6 (2.94)	100.2 (3.94)	106.2 (4.18)	88.3 (3.48)	98.3 (3.87)	84.6 (3.33)	80.1 (3.15)	81.1 (3.19)	81.0 (3.19)	1,015.3 (39.97)
Mean monthly sunshine hours	233.5	182.9	177.8	150.1	120.6	91.7	115.1	117.5	134.8	182.5	190.8	208.5	1,905.8
Source: NIWA
