= Fernside Homestead =

Fernside
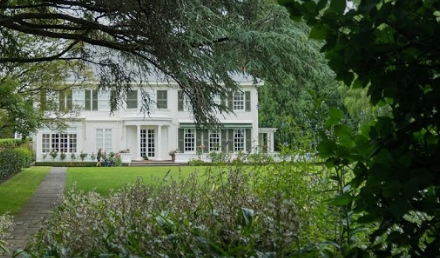
- Fernside in 2015

General information
- Type: House
- Architectural style: Neo-Georgian
- Location: Featherston, New Zealand
- Coordinates: 41°06′10.6″S 175°21′54.2″E
- Completed: 1924
- Owner: Charles Elgar

Design and construction
- Architect: Heathcote Helmore

Fernside is a five-bedroom white-weatherboard slate-roofed American Colonial Revival style house with an L-shape plan. It covers approximately 9,000 square feet or less than 1,000 square metres. There are three further bedrooms in the staff wing of the main house. Set by the Tauherenikau River on the plain below the junction of the Tararua and Rimutaka ranges Fernside was built in 1924 to replace a house destroyed by fire.

The current building is the work of the educated tastes of client, Ella, Mrs Charles Elgar and her 29-year-old architect, Heathcote Helmore.

The house is near Featherston down a tree-lined mile-long (1.6 kilometres) drive from State Highway 2 and surrounded by 12 acres of expertly maintained and landscaped gardens. The gardens have mature features much more than a century old. The associated farmland which gave it the title homestead has been under separate ownership since 1945.

Fernside is one of a small group of similar sized houses. This location let not-quite-absentee owners of remote coastal sheep stations live with easy access to the railway, main roads system and later, at the local Tauherenikau Racecourse, an airfield.

It has always been and remains a private residence. In the early 1990s before putting it up for sale an owner did offer a then rundown Fernside as an exclusive B & B lodge.

Fernside was the name of the district which is now a part of Tauherenikau. Fernside railway station, accessed from the far side of the railway line, closed in 1975.

The following critique is by Wellington architect Michael Fowler F.N.Z.I.A.

"Fernside is approached from the main road along a mile-long drive of oak trees, which turns into a walled carriageway of fifty yards' length. Seldom has such conscious planning been devoted to the approach to a New Zealand house to dramatise the act of arrival. Nothing is overlooked: the iron grille gate in the side wall of the carriageway, through which one glimpses the gardens beyond; the solid timber arched door through the heightened forecourt walls, leading to the screened service yard, the radial paving in the circular court. This consistency is continued in the great Georgian house, with its two-floored, pedimented bay, its classic entranceway, the shuttered windows, the generous bracket eaves, the slate roof."
—Michael Fowler, architect and three-times Mayor of Wellington in his 1971 book Country Houses of New Zealand, North Island

== Concept ==
Though built of timber —in view of the 1942 Wairarapa earthquakes, fortunately — it was conceived as a brick building and the working drawings were made on that assumption.

== History ==
The first significant house on this farm was built on Underhill Road in the early 1870s for Henry Bunny. In 1876 it was bought by Richard John Barton (1846–1879) of White Rock Station (Note: His White Rock partner and younger brother William Barton (1858–1938) built a house on the same road and called it Fareham. It has Heritage New Zealand List Entry Type —Historic Place Category 2.) and his wife, Pihautea-born Catherine Carne Bidwill. Catherine's father brought the first flock of sheep to the Wairarapa in 1844. but, ill for a long time, he died in 1879. Mrs Barton remarried to G. T. F. Hutton of Ruatuna (Ruakokapatuna), Martinborough in 1881.

=== Mrs Elgar ===
Charles Elgar leased Fernside's 1,134 acres or 460 hectares from the Barton trustees about 1886. He married Ella Pharazyn in 1890, their only child was born there the following year, and he bought the property in 1888. (Note: The sometimes slightly adulatory tone of Te Papa items Fernside, the Elgar homestead and Biography of Ella Grace Elgar may have been a sign of response to pressure. Te Papa curators decided old European furnishings however fine did not fit with their project. Their unpublicised attempts to liquidate the Elgar bequest were reported in the daily press and subsequently blocked.) Mrs Hutton kept the homestead with a 100-acre home farm and lived there until the autumn of 1901 and afterwards was known as Algies Farm.

==== Gardens ====
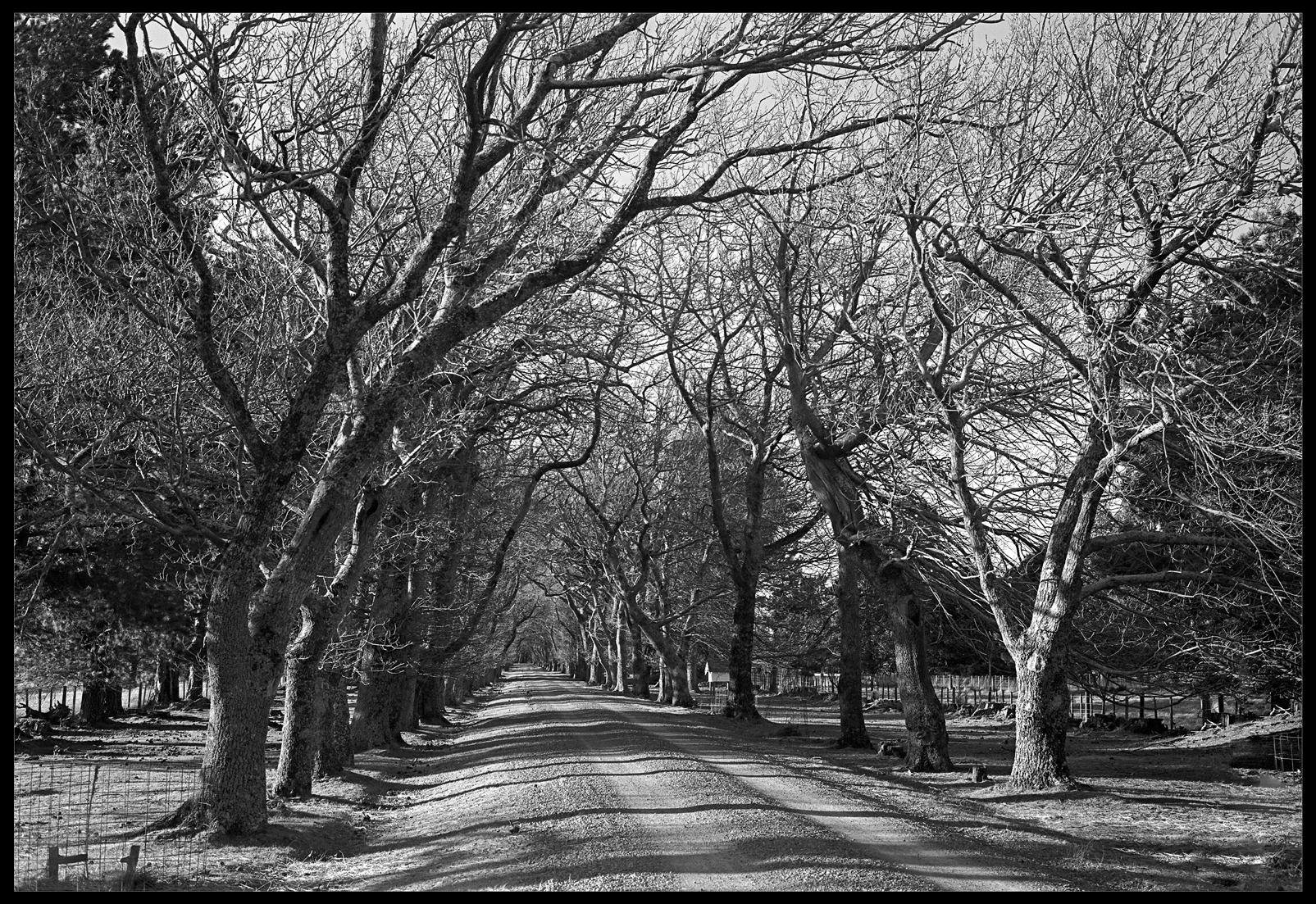
Oaks in winter The mile-long drive to the house

The Fernside/Longwood water race was begun in 1890 and Fernside lake is known to have existed by 1899. In the summer of 1908 -1909 there were extensive alterations to the Fernside headworks of their joint water-race scheme improving the water supply to livestock at Fernside and at Longwood. Seventeen men were employed. Shortly before Christmas 1913 members of The Wairarapa Automobile Association and friends were entertained by Martin Elgar and Mrs Izard, sister of Mrs Charles Elgar, at a garden party at Fernside. The Evening Post reported: "A large sum of money has been spent on the grounds" and how H. R. Bunny, in his speech thanking host and hostess on behalf of the club's committee, "remarked that a wilderness of fern and manuka had been transformed into a veritable paradise".

==== Fire ====
The Elgar's homestead (Note: National Library Reference Number: Pan-0238-F) of 20 rooms and its contents were totally destroyed by fire in November 1923. Being heavily insured the Elgars appointed Heathcote Helmore to design a new one and promptly departed overseas to buy antiques and furnishings for their new home.

==== Heathcote Helmore ====
Heathcote Helmore, one of a well-known Christchurch family, was articled to architect Cecil Wood in 1912 aged 17. Following the 1914 outbreak of war he was posted to the position of A-d-c to the current Governor-General and he remained there four years. He is assumed to have returned to Wood to finish his articles after the Armistice. He won admission to the Institute of Architects in April 1920. With a younger architect friend, Guy Cotterill, he set out to gather overseas experience. They travelled to England in July 1920 on the ship S.S. Ionic with the retiring Governor-General and when they docked in Newport News took up his offer to take them in Liverpool's car to Yorktown where the young men took a deep interest in the colonial architecture of Virginia.

In London Helmore maintained social links with well-connected people including Mrs Elgar's son-in-law, an A.d.c. to the previous Governor. Along with Cotterill Helmore worked for an architectural firm in London on a large private building and in laying out planned new garden suburbs at Portsmouth and at Weybridge but the projects were cancelled and by September 1921 their work had ended. At the suggestion of the same son-in-law Sir Edwin Lutyens invited Helmore to work, sometimes directly with him, on the detailing of the interior of Queen Mary's Dolls' House. (Note: Gertrude Jekyll provided plans for a garden for the Queen’s Dolls’ House. Her niece Barbara married Wellington-raised war hero Bernard Freyberg in 1922. Expatriates in London tend to flock together. Mrs Elgar’s son-in-law knew architect Edwin Lutyens well enough to ask for and get a job for his friend, Helmore. However there is no record of participation by Gertrude Jekyll in any schemes for Fernside’s gardens.) He started with Lutyens at the beginning of October 1921. On at least one occasion Helmore exhibited some of his drawings to Queen Mary. He may have worked on minor buildings near the Viceroy's house in New Delhi. There is no record of when he left Lutyens but by February 1923 he was back in Christchurch and had begun his practice on his own account.

=== Their masterpiece ===
Mrs Elgar was described as having "discerning eye and superb taste" with Heathcote Helmore and his "strong regard for historical precedent" Ella Elgar developed the design of the new house and its surroundings. Mrs Elgar collected particularly high-quality furniture and furnishings. Her careful documentation of purchases right down to domestic linen (monogrammed) and soft furnishings is in the possession of her family. Helmore was to maintain a keen interest in garden design throughout his career.

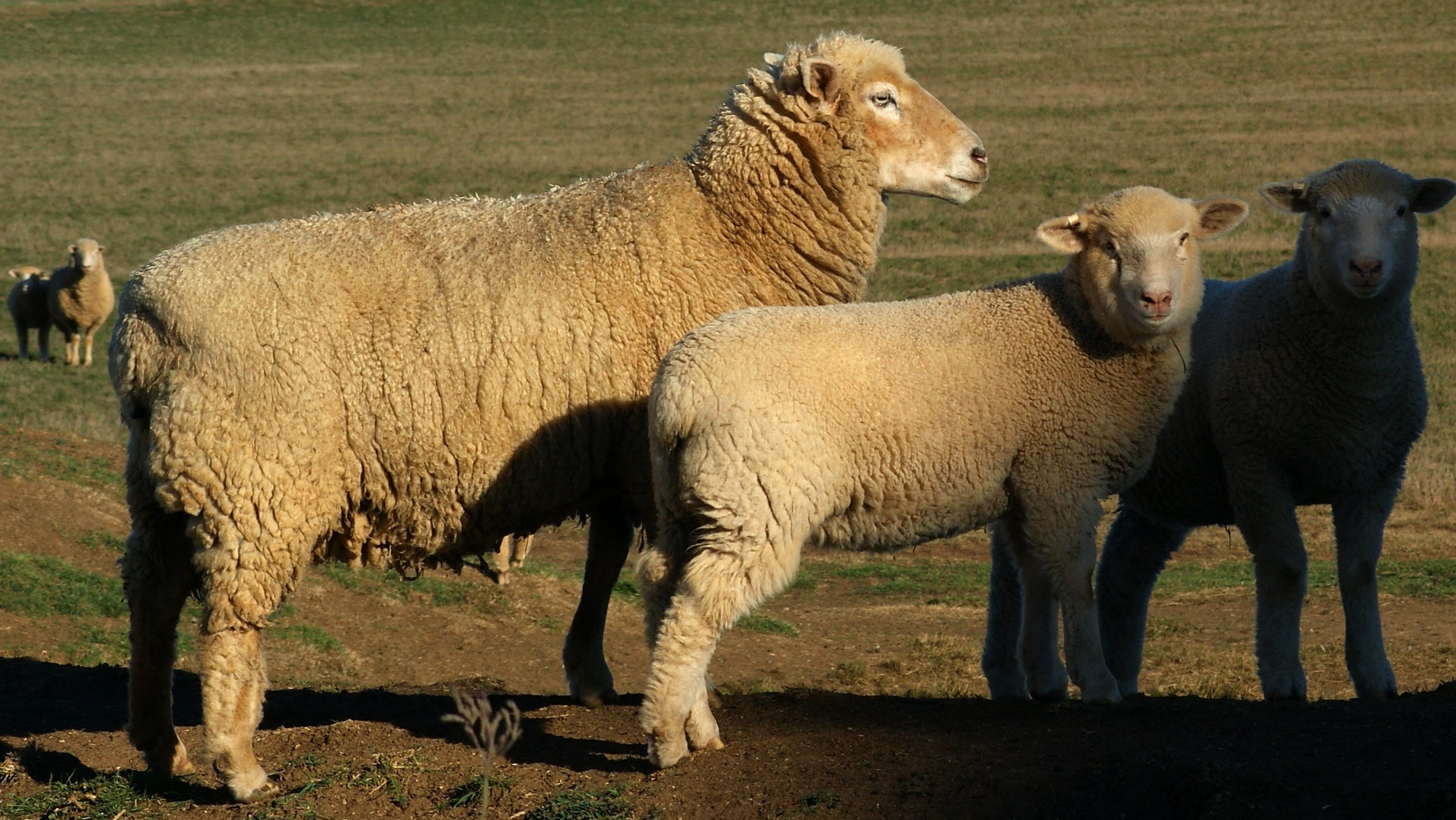

Charles Elgar died suddenly in the luncheon interval of the Easter Saturday 1930 race meeting at the neighbouring Tauherenikau Racecourse. He owned Clay Creek station near Martinborough and Awa Awaroa station in Kahutara. With his brother Martin, he competed with other woolgrowers to create the ideal breed for New Zealand conditions, their contribution was to Border Leicesters. An enthusiastic owner of thoroughbred racehorses his obituary claimed "His courage as a buyer of thoroughbred horses was never rewarded in proportion to the extent of his purchases, but from time to time he has had some useful horses carrying his colours."

The second world war broke out in September 1939 and in February 1940 Mrs Elgar offered the use of the house to the Red Cross 'for the duration of the war' as a convalescent home for officers and men of New Zealand Division . There had been newspaper reports of Japanese atrocities. In September 1942 at the request of the U.S. Government her paddocks between her house and the main road were taken for a Japanese Prisoner of War camp. 31 prisoners were killed there on 23 February 1943. She took a flat in central Christchurch where she died in the spring of 1945. Fernside's farmland was given to the R. S. A., split into three blocks and sold by ballot to returned servicemen. A dispersal sale of unwanted house contents was held on-site in April 1946. Under her will the Dominion Museum now the Museum of New Zealand Te Papa Tongarewa received some of Fernside's furniture. In the Dominion Museum it was displayed in sets of period rooms designed by Heathcote Helmore for the purpose but at Te Papa some items are displayed individually from time to time.

=== U.S. Government ===
U.S. Forces won the May 1942 Battle of the Coral Sea and saved New Zealand from Japanese occupation. Postwar the U.S. Government wanted to replace the British and bring New Zealand closer within its ambit. New Zealand's first ambassador from the United States, Robert M. Scotten, appointed in late 1947, arranged his government's purchase of 38 Fitzherbert Terrace (built 1926 to the American Colonial Revival designs of the same firm, Helmore & Cotterill, demolished for the motorway) in Thorndon, Wellington in July 1948 as an official residence. Ambassador Scotten sat in on Cabinet meetings. To cultivate people in government and of wider community influence with considerable style, and well away from Wellington, Scotten and his wife also occupied 70 kilometres distant Fernside as their country residence. The United States government later approved the purchase of Fernside from the Elgar trustees as of 31 March 1949. Visiting dignitaries included Helen Keller and Pat Nixon.

The ANZUS Pact entered into force in April 1952. Subsequent ambassadors found Fernside too remote for their scaled down objectives and it was offered for sale in 1955. After some time it was bought by a Wellington professional man for family weekends. It has changed hands a number of times since then.

=== Twenty-first century ===
Fernside has remained in private ownership and occupation. The current owners bought it in 2007. They have restored the house and its contents to the fine 1920s style and high standards of Mrs Elgar and make a continuing major investment in its surrounding gardens which are sometimes opened to the public.

Fernside's gardens before restoration featured in Peter Jackson's 2003 film The Lord of the Rings: The Return of the King.
