= Charles Johnson Pharazyn =

New Zealand politician (1802–1903)

The Honourable Charles Johnson Pharazyn
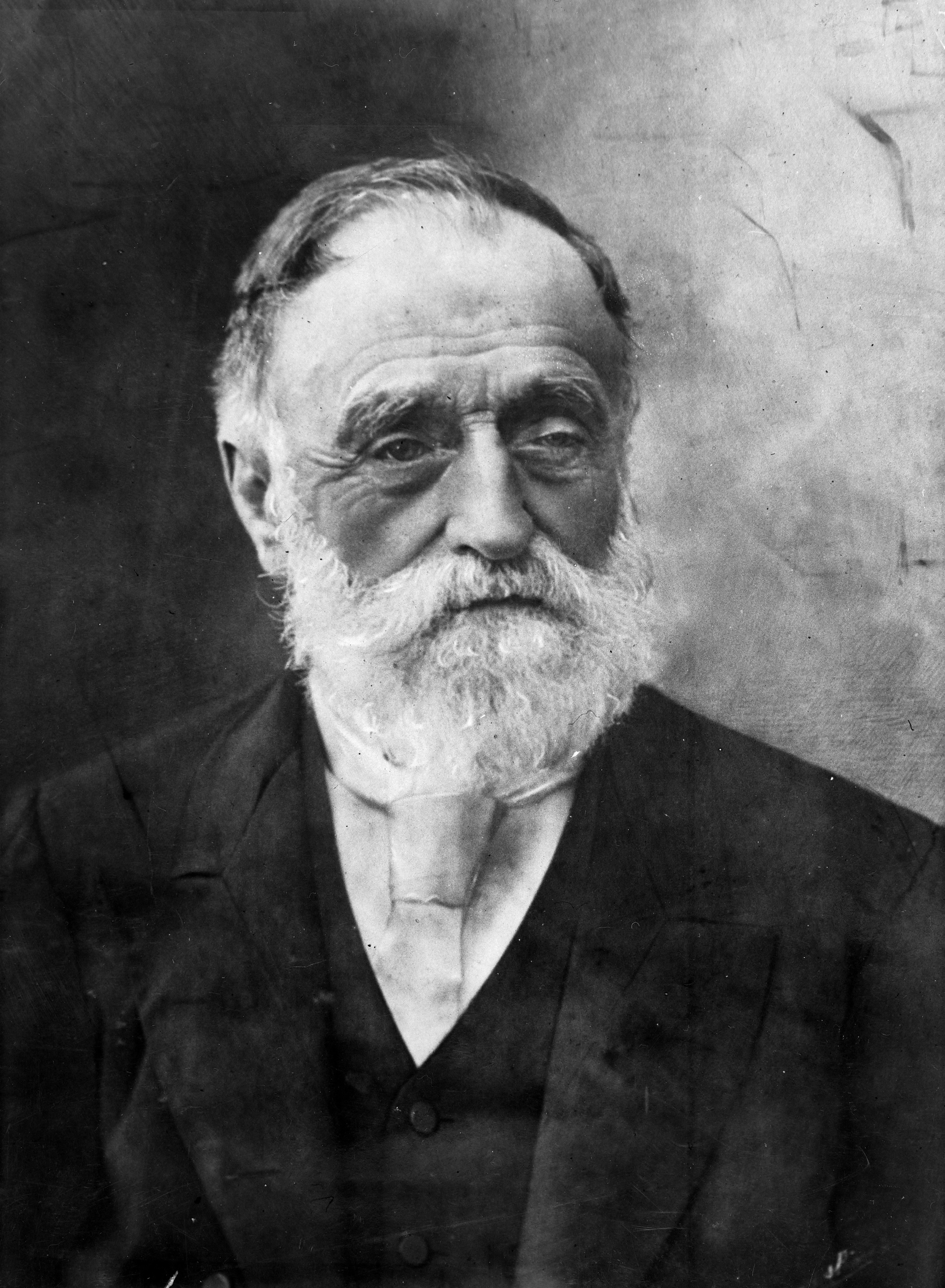
- Charles Johnson Pharazyn during the time he was on the Legislative Council

Member of the New Zealand Legislative Council
- In office 17 June 1869 – 11 March 1885

Personal details
- Born: 11 October 1802 London, England
- Died: 16 August 1903 (aged 100) Wellington, New Zealand
- Party: Independent
- Spouse(s): Harriet Maria (m. 1825); Mary Catherine Buckland (m. 1832, d. 1864); Jessica Rankin (m. 1867, d. 1891)
- Relations: William Noel Pharazyn (grandson); Ella Pharazyn (granddaughter)
- Children: Robert Pharazyn
- Occupation: runholder, merchant

Charles Johnson Pharazyn (11 October 1802 – 16 August 1903) was a runholder, merchant, and member of the New Zealand Legislative Council who lived beyond 100 years of age. His obituary in the Wellington newspaper described him as a man of much wealth.

== Biography ==
Pharazyn was born in London in 1802. He arrived in Wellington on the Jane on 24 May 1841 and established himself as a merchant. Tiring of this he became a runholder leasing a run in Palliser Bay with William Fitzherbert.

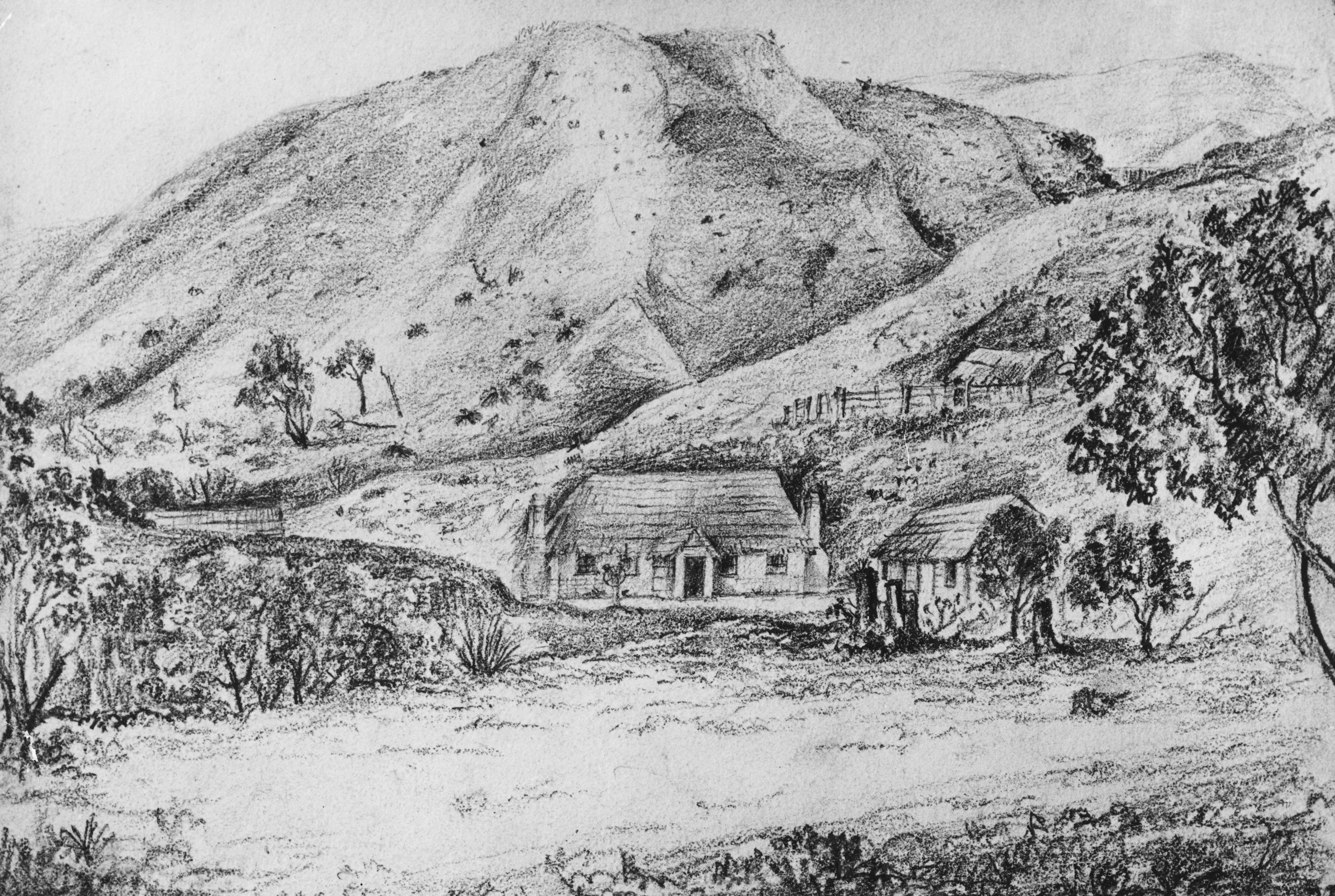
Whatarangi, the first run by his son Robert

After a visit to England, he became a merchant again in partnership with, first John Johnston, and later Nathaniel Levin. He retired from business in 1871. He was eccentric; when he lost his spectacles in 1872, he walked through Wellington with a sign around his neck: "Lost, a pair of spectacles". He claimed that the Wellington newspapers were so dull that nobody read them, so advertising in them was pointless. He took a cold bath every morning, by which he explained his good health until old age.

Pharazyn was appointed by the governor to the Legislative Council on 17 June 1869 called by premier Edward Stafford. These appointments were made for life.

Education boards were set up under the Education Act, 1872 and in 1875 Pharazyn was appointed chairman as well as treasurer of the Wellington Education Board. "During a discussion at the Education Board, (says the Evening Argus), as to the price to be charged for boarders attending the Tenui School the Hon. C. J Pharazyn said that during his station life he kept himself and family of nine on £100 a year. The statement was readily believed. Mr Pharazyn would have been believed had he said he could keep a family of twelve on £50 a year." The Wanganui Herald quoted in Wairarapa School History.

The New Zealand Mail followed up with: "It is refreshing to find that public opinion, as represented by the Press, entirely agrees with Mr. Pharazyn's statement that he was used to feed and clothe a family on £100 a year when at a station. Everyone knows the station. It had quite a reputation in its day, and was called, I believe, the " Go on " station, from a popular belief that to stop at it in hopes of getting anything would have been useless."

He was convicted and fined for offences in connection with voting in 1884, which gave the local paper the Evening Post some satisfaction.

He resigned from the Legislative Council on 11 March 1885, when he was well into his 80s, so that the eldest of his four sons, Robert, could succeed him. This is said to be the closest the Legislative Council ever came to the hereditary principle.

Pharazyn married three times. He married Harriet Maria in London in 1825. There were no surviving children. He married Mary Catherine Buckland in London in 1832, they had four sons but she died in 1864. He married Jessica Rankin on 24 December 1867 at St. Paul's Church in Wellington, she died in 1891. Nearing his 101st birthday Pharazyn died in 1903 at the residence of his daughter-in-law, Mrs William Pharazyn, "Seacroft", Hobson Street, Thorndon, Wellington. His four sons died before him but he did leave five grandsons, four granddaughters and three great-grandchildren one of them being Ella Pharazyn, whose furniture collection was in the Dominion Museum.

Pharazyn's third son, Charles (1839–1903), was a runholder in the Wairarapa at Longwood, Featherston. The fourth son of this man but only son of his second wife was notable soldier, businessman, journalist, lecturer and trade unionist William Noel Pharazyn (1894–1980). His son William Pharazyn (1842–1872) married Frances Mary Greenwood the daughter of John Danforth Greenwood and Sarah Greenwood (née Field).
