= Noel Pharazyn =

New Zealand soldier, businessman and journalist (1894–1980)

Noel Pharazyn MC
- Born: 10 April 1894; Wellington, New Zealand
- Died: 11 June 1980 (aged 86)
- Occupations: soldier, trade unionist

William Noel Pharazyn MC (10 April 1894 – 11 June 1980) was a New Zealand soldier, businessman, journalist, lecturer and trade unionist.

== Early life ==
=== Merged merchant and political families ===
Grandson of successful local merchant and runholder, Charles Johnson Pharazyn, Noel Pharazyn was born in Wellington, New Zealand in 1894 the son of Charles Pharazyn (1839–1903) a prosperous Wairarapa runholder and landowner who lived at Longwood near Featherston and his second wife Englishwoman Maud Eleanor Kempthorne (1859–1928), daughter of Cornish surgeon John Kempthorne.

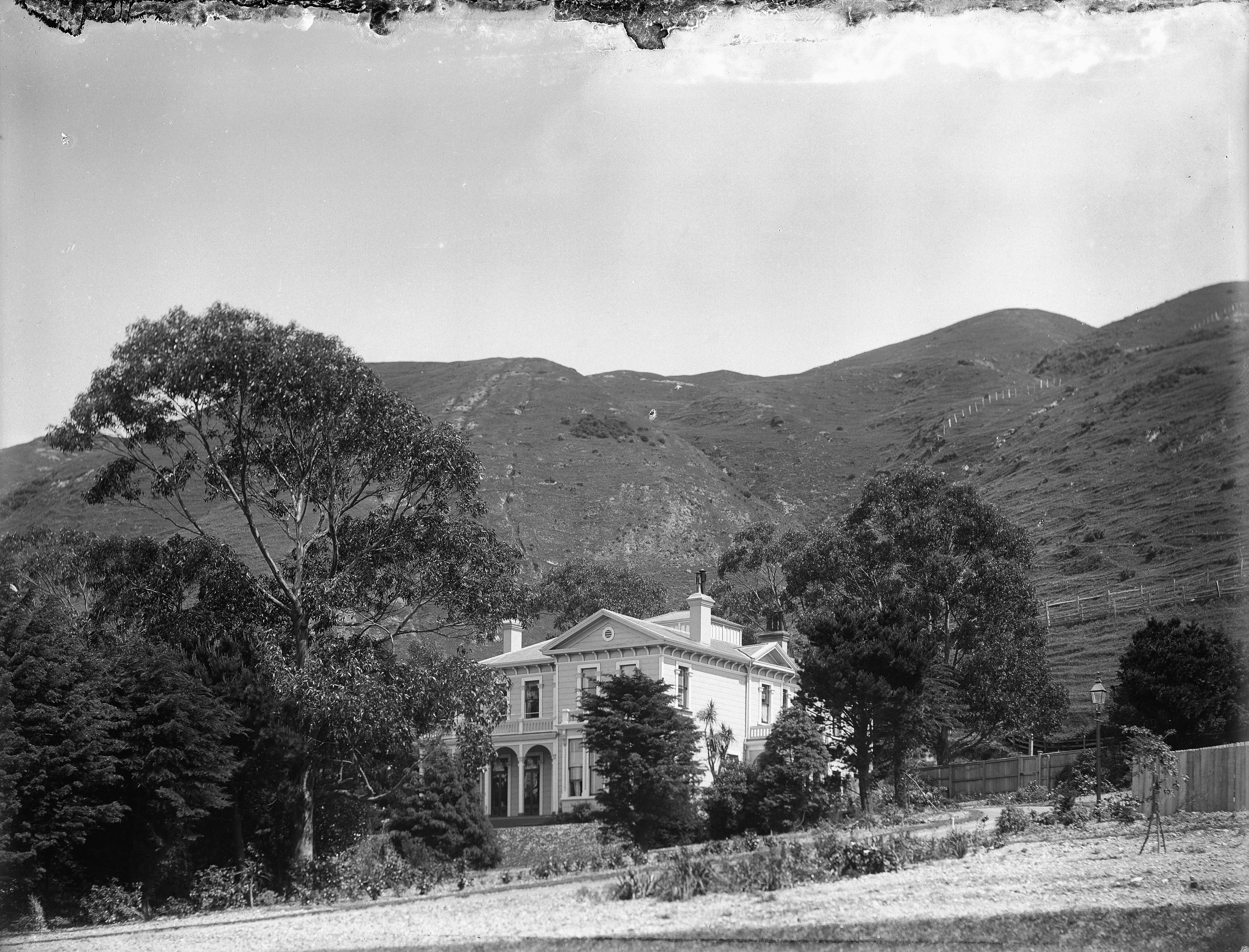
Pendennis, Thorndon — now 15 Burnell Avenue and 59 to 73 Grant Rd

His father died in London following an unsuccessful operation when Noel was eight. A few days before his death it was announced he had bought 12,800,000 acres of cattle country in the northern part of South Australia. Ella Elgar, whose furniture collection was in the Dominion Museum, was a daughter of his father's first marriage to Frances Margaret Buckland who died in Italy in 1883.

His mother remarried a widower and prominent Wellington businessman, Gerald Fitzgerald, son of prominent politician James FitzGerald. Fitzgerald's sister Amy was the widow of Willie Levin and the new merged Fitzgerald family moved to the former Levin house, Pendennis, in Tinakori Road. There were seven indoor servants. Both Noel's grandfather Pharazyn and his uncle Robert Pharazyn had been members of the Legislative Council New Zealand's unelected Upper House of parliament.

=== Military Cross ===
Pharazyn was a pupil at Dulwich College London after attending Nelson College in 1908 and 1909. He then gained admission to the Royal Military Academy, Woolwich and joined the Royal Field Artillery in August 1914 as a junior officer. Wounded at the battle of the Somme in 1916 he was promoted to acting Major in 1917 and awarded the Military Cross in November 1918. He remained with the army after the armistice.

=== Marriage ===
Noel Pharazyn married Lydia Field on 26 November 1919 at St Paul's in Wellington. This was reported by Free Lance as a "society wedding". Being from a well-established family himself, his wife came from a family of members of parliament; her uncle Henry Augustus Field had represented the Otaki electorate from 1896 until his death three years later, and her father succeeded him and represented the electorate until 1935 with a three-year break. Another of her relatives, Thomas Field, represented the Nelson electorate for some years.

== Career ==
=== Business ===
The British Army reduced its establishment in 1923 (see Geddes Axe), so he took his gratuity and entered business in Australia but by the end of the 1920s had decided he had more important things to do.

=== Soviet Union ===
Though his wealth, military background, political, pastoral and business connections and manner might have suggested otherwise Pharazyn became a committed left-wing intellectual in the early 1930s.

After the onset of the Great Depression he went to London in 1930, wrote and studied economics then next year spent a month in the Soviet Union getting back to New Zealand in mid 1932 where he became a member of the Friends of the Soviet Union (New Zealand section) and a member of its national committee.

His main interest, journalism, led him to write for Tomorrow an independent left-wing weekly. He and his wife became members of the committee of the Workers' Defence Organisation. He disagreed with their economic policies but welcomed the new Labour government of 1935 though he attacked their compulsory unionism.

During 1936 he resigned from the Friends of the Soviet Union in protest at Stalin's show trials.

=== Workers' unions ===
Pharazyn was asked by Fintan Patrick Walsh in 1936 to become secretary of the new Wellington Clerical Workers' Union. In 1938 Pharazyn obtained election as secretary of the New Zealand Federated Clerical and Office Staff Employees' Association and became the union's main spokesperson.

== Defence of the realm ==
In March 1940 he was called up for military service and appointed New Zealand's military attaché in Washington DC with the rank of lieutenant-colonel. After the war he resumed his union involvement but took less prominent roles. He provided much support for F P Walsh and following Walsh's defeat as clerical union president in 1960 Pharazyn ended his union and political involvement.

His wife died of cancer in 1971 and Noel Pharazyn died in 1980 aged 87. There were no surviving children.
