= Ella Elgar =

New Zealand entrepreneur and art collector

- Mrs Ella Elgar by Laurer & Blechschwidt photography studio from the collection of the Museum of New Zealand Te Papa Tongarewa.
- Born: Ella Grace Pharazyn; June 18, 1869; Whatarangi, Palliser Bay, New Zealand
- Died: August 23, 1945 (aged 76); Victoria Street, Christchurch, New Zealand
- Known for: The collection of valuable furniture and furnishings for her country mansion Fernside that she bequeathed to the Dominion Museum now the Museum of New Zealand Te Papa Tongarewa after her death.
- Spouse: Charles Elgar
- Children: 1
- Relatives: Charles Johnson Pharazyn (grandfather); Noel Pharazyn (half-brother)

Ella Grace Elgar (née Pharazyn; 1869–1945) was a New Zealand socialite and art collector.

== Biography ==
Ella Grace Pharazyn was born in 1869 into the Wairarapa's wealthiest colonial family, The patriarch of the family, Ella Pharazyn's grandfather, was Charles Johnson Pharazyn (1802–1903) who was the first to leased land at Palliser Bay to graze sheep in 1845. His sons also became sheep farmers, and one of them, Charles Pharazyn Junior, was Ella Pharazyn's father. Ella Elgar's father died in 1903, leaving an estate worth more than £150,000. Much of Elgars early life was spent in England where she was educated.

Elgar is the half-sister of Lieutenant-Colonel Noel Pharazyn. Her twin sister, Ida, was killed at the age of twelve in a railway accident when a train was blown off the tracks over the Remutaka Range. In 1890 she married Charles Elgar a well-known owner of racehorses and her father's farm manager and partner. They had one daughter, Enid Awa Elgar, who married Gilbert Claud Hamilton, the son of Lord Claud Hamilton.

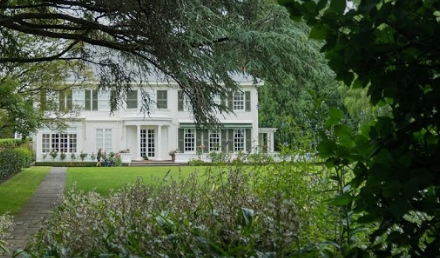
Elgar's former home Fernside Homestead near Featherston in 2015

Their daughter Enid died in 1916 of tuberculosis. Ella and Charles Elgar lived at Fernside Homestead, Charles's 1,134-acre (459 ha) estate near Featherston, New Zealand. The Elgars entertained at their estate Fernside in grand style. They held dinners, balls, and parties.

Elgar made regular trips to Europe, China, and Japan, where she bought a valuable collection of museum-quality furniture and furnishings as furnishings for her country mansion Fernside. After Elgar died she bequeathed the collection now known as the Elgar Collection to the Dominion Museum now the Museum of New Zealand Te Papa Tongarewa. (Note: The sometimes slightly adulatory tone of Te Papa items Fernside, the Elgar homestead and Biography of Ella Grace Elgar may have been a sign of response to pressure. Te Papa curators decided old European furnishings however fine did not fit with their project. Their unpublicised attempts to liquidate the Elgar bequest were blocked.) Elgar would have learned about period rooms in leading museums around the world, such as the Metropolitan Museum of Art or the Victoria and Albert Museum, and left some clear instructions on her collection and display, as well as money to fund an exhibition. She wanted to display the collection at the National Art Gallery, on the upper floor of the Dominion Museum building, in two purpose-built period rooms called The Elgar Rooms. The Queen Anne and Stuart room, as well as the Georgian Room, were to hold items from those historical periods.

Her husband Charles Elgar died in the luncheon interval at Featherston's Tauherenikau Racecourse on 19 April 1930. Ella Elgar continued living at Fernside until February 1940 when she gave the use of house to the Red Cross 'for the duration of war' as a convalescent home for officers and men of New Zealand Division later known as 2nd New Zealand Division. She took a flat in Victoria Street Christchurch where she died in on 23 August 1945.
