= Charles Elgar =

Charles or Charlie Elgar may refer to:

- Charlie Elgar (1879–1973), American violinist, musician, teacher and jazz band-leader
- Charles Elgar (entrepreneur) (died 1930), wealthy New Zealand entrepreneur
