= Charles Elgar (entrepreneur) =

New Zealand entrepreneur

- Born: 1855
- Died: 19 April 1930 (aged 74–75); Featherston, New Zealand
- Spouse: Ella Pharazyn
- Children: 1

Charles Chapman Elgar (1855 – 19 April 1930) was a wealthy New Zealand entrepreneur and the husband of wealthy socialite Ella Elgar (1869–1945).

== Biography ==
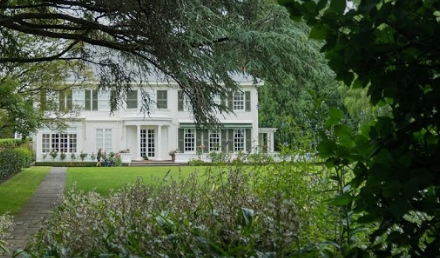
Elgar's former home Fernside Homestead near Featherston in 2015

He was a director of the National Bank of New Zealand and the chairman of the Wellington Meat Export Company, Ltd. He was also a well-known owner of racehorses. He lived at Fernside Homestead, a 1,134-acre estate near Featherston. He also owned Clay Creek Estate outside of Martinborough.

In 1890 he married Ella Pharazyn who had been born into one of the Wairarapa's wealthiest colonial families a family who had built their fortune on sheep farming. They had one daughter, Enid Awa Elgar, who married Gilbert Claud Hamilton, the son of Lord Claud Hamilton. His daughter died in 1916 aged 25.

Elgar had racehorses and in 1923, his colt Black Ronald won the New Zealand Derby. He also owned Vertigern, whose wins included the 1929 Wellington Cup and the 1930 Awapuni Gold Cup. Elgar died in the luncheon interval at Featherston's Tauherenikau Racecourse on 19 April 1930. His wife, Ella, half-sister of Lieutenant-Colonel Noel Pharazyn, died fifteen years later in her flat in Victoria Street, Christchurch, on 23 August 1945.
