= QT Wellington Hotel =

Museum in Wellington, New Zealand

QT Wellington
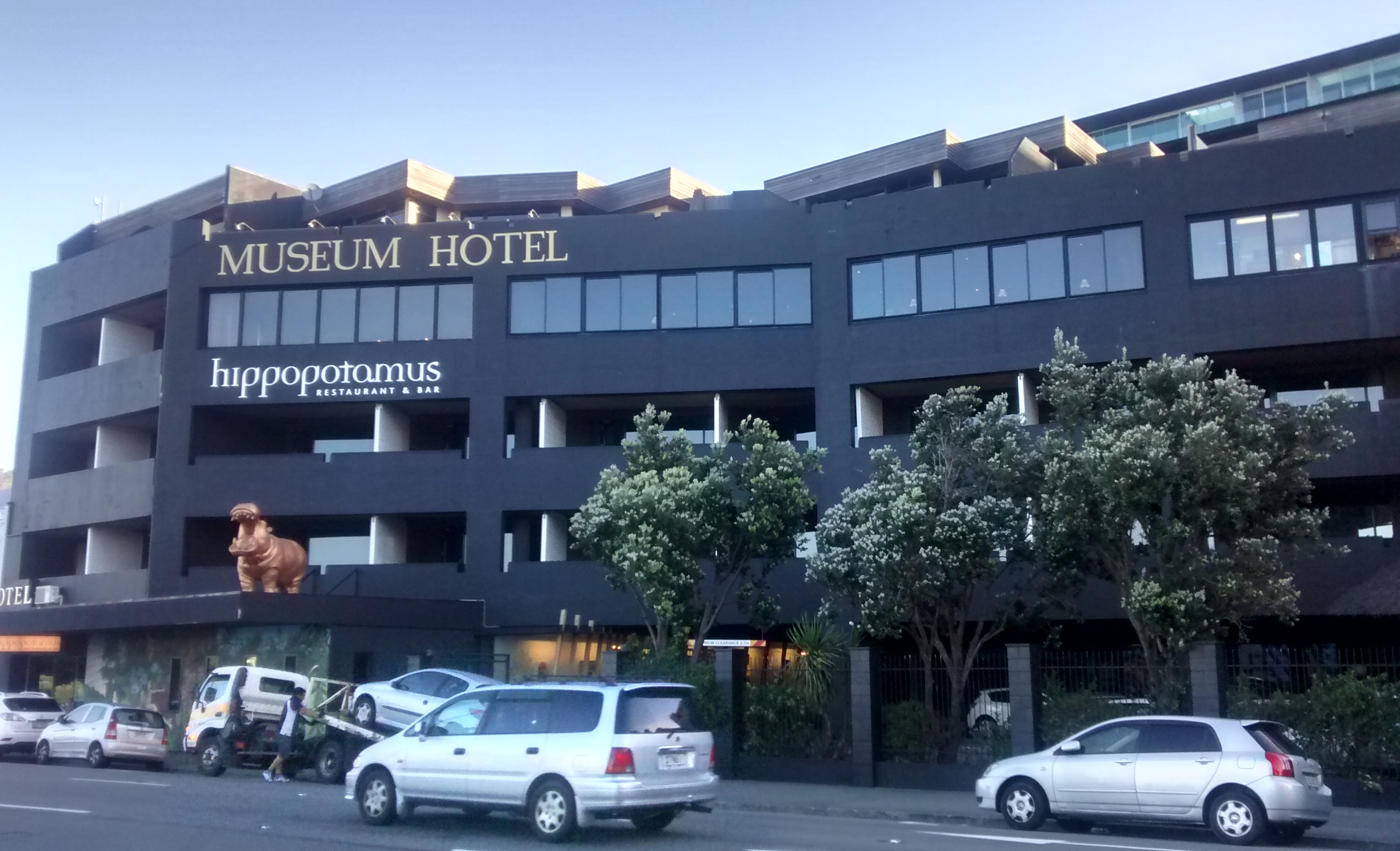
- Interactive map of the QT Wellington area
- Former names: Museum Art Hotel, Museum Hotel de Wheels, Museum Hotel, Michael Fowler Hotel

General information
- Location: 90 Cable Street, Wellington 6011
- Coordinates: 41°17′30″S 174°46′58″E
- Opened: 1987
- Relocated: 1993

Design and construction
- Architect: Geoff Richards
- Main contractor: Downer and Co Ltd

Website
- www.qthotels.com/wellington/

The QT Wellington Hotel (previously the Museum Art Hotel, Museum Hotel de Wheels, and originally called the Michael Fowler Hotel) is located in Wellington, New Zealand. It is one of the largest buildings to have been moved from one site to another.

The building was designed by architect Geoff Richards and completed in 1987. Originally known as the Michael Fowler Hotel, it had 38 guest rooms and two penthouse suites. Sir Michael Fowler lived in a residential apartment on the top floor. The Government bought the building in 1990 as it wanted the land for the proposed Museum of New Zealand. Entrepreneur Chris Parkin took over management of the hotel in October 1990 and bought the building from the Government in 1992. By that time it was known as the Museum Hotel. After the building was relocated, its name changed to the Museum Hotel de Wheels, then the Museum Art Hotel. In 2015 Parkin sold the hotel to Amalgamated Holdings, and in 2017 the hotel's name was changed to QT Wellington. Parkin's collection of around 200 artworks is housed in and leased to the hotel. The hotel expanded into a neighbouring property in 2004, adding 94 hotel rooms and 127 apartments, and as of 2020 had 180 rooms, including 25 art-inspired Gallery Rooms and 99 self-contained apartments.

== Relocation of the building ==
Weighing an estimated 3500 tonnes, the reinforced concrete building was moved from its original site, now the location of the Museum of New Zealand Te Papa Tongarewa, to a site more than 100 metres down and across a major road.

The relocation started in May 1993 and took just over five months. The hotel's weight was transferred from 17 columns to a giant steel grid bolted on to railway bogies, then hydraulic jacks were pushed up between the grid and the bottom of the hotel, and the columns were cut to transfer the weight. The hotel was wheeled on 8 sets of parallel rails 80 metres along Cable Street on 14–15 August 1993. The wheels were then turned 90 degrees, and the building pushed 40 metres across the road on 21 August on another set of rails to a point where it was joined to new foundations, and recommenced operation as a hotel.

During this process, the only items removed from the hotel were the bed linens. Everything else remained in situ, even the bottles in the bar. Nothing was damaged in the move and there were no signs of any building stress or damage as cracks.

Motive power for the move was eight hydraulic rams capable of providing 160 tonnes of push. In the event only 8 tonnes of push were required to get the building rolling. Each of the two moves was accomplished in one day, at a maximum speed of 12 metres per hour. Between the first move and the second, time was required to turn the 96 railway bogies used 90 degrees. Each bogie had 4 wheels, so the point loading through each wheel was less than 10 tonnes.

At the time of moving, the building was only five years old. Although comparatively new, the hotel was to have been demolished to make way for the much larger structure of the National Museum. Chris Parkin, the entrepreneur who undertook the project, was awarded the title of 'Wellingtonian of the Year' in 1993.
