= Te Papa =

National museum of New Zealand

Museum of New Zealand Te Papa Tongarewa

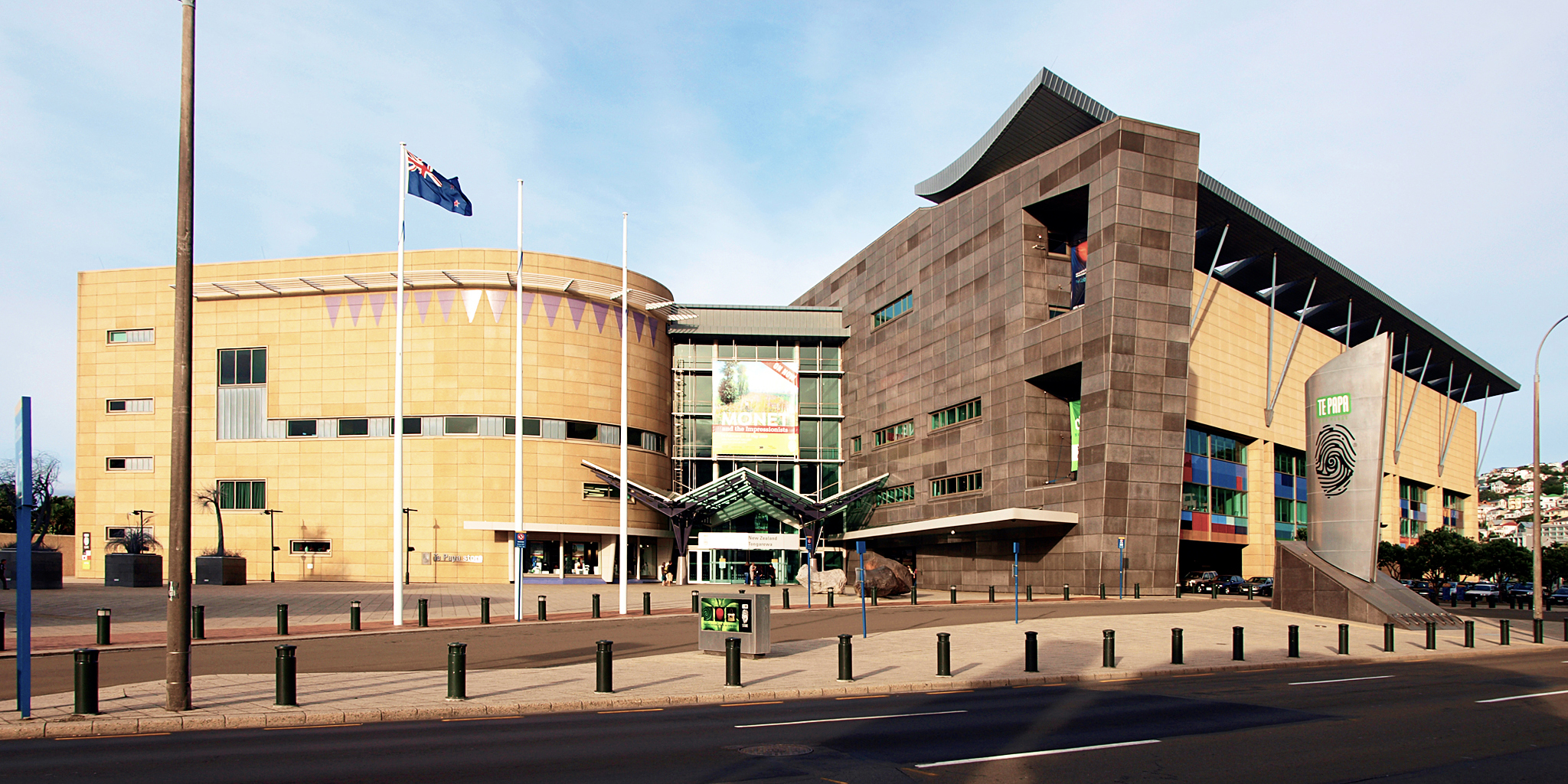
- Front side with entrance in 2009
- Interactive fullscreen map
- Former name: Dominion Museum and National Art Gallery
- Established: 1992
- Location: Wellington, New Zealand
- Coordinates: 41°17′26″S 174°46′55″E
- Visitors: 1.5 million (2017)
- Kaihautū: Arapata Hakiwai
- Director: Courtney Johnston
- Website: Official website

The Museum of New Zealand Te Papa Tongarewa is New Zealand's national museum and is located in Wellington. Usually known as Te Papa (Māori for 'the treasure box'), it opened in 1998 after the merging of the National Museum of New Zealand and the National Art Gallery. An average of more than 1.1 million people visit every year, making it the 58th-most-visited art gallery in the world in 2023. Te Papa operates under a bicultural philosophy and emphasises the living stories behind its cultural treasures. Te Papa charges an entrance fee of $35 for international visitors (as of September 2024) but has free entry for all New Zealanders. Some temporary exhibitions are ticketed, but may have occasional free days.

== History ==
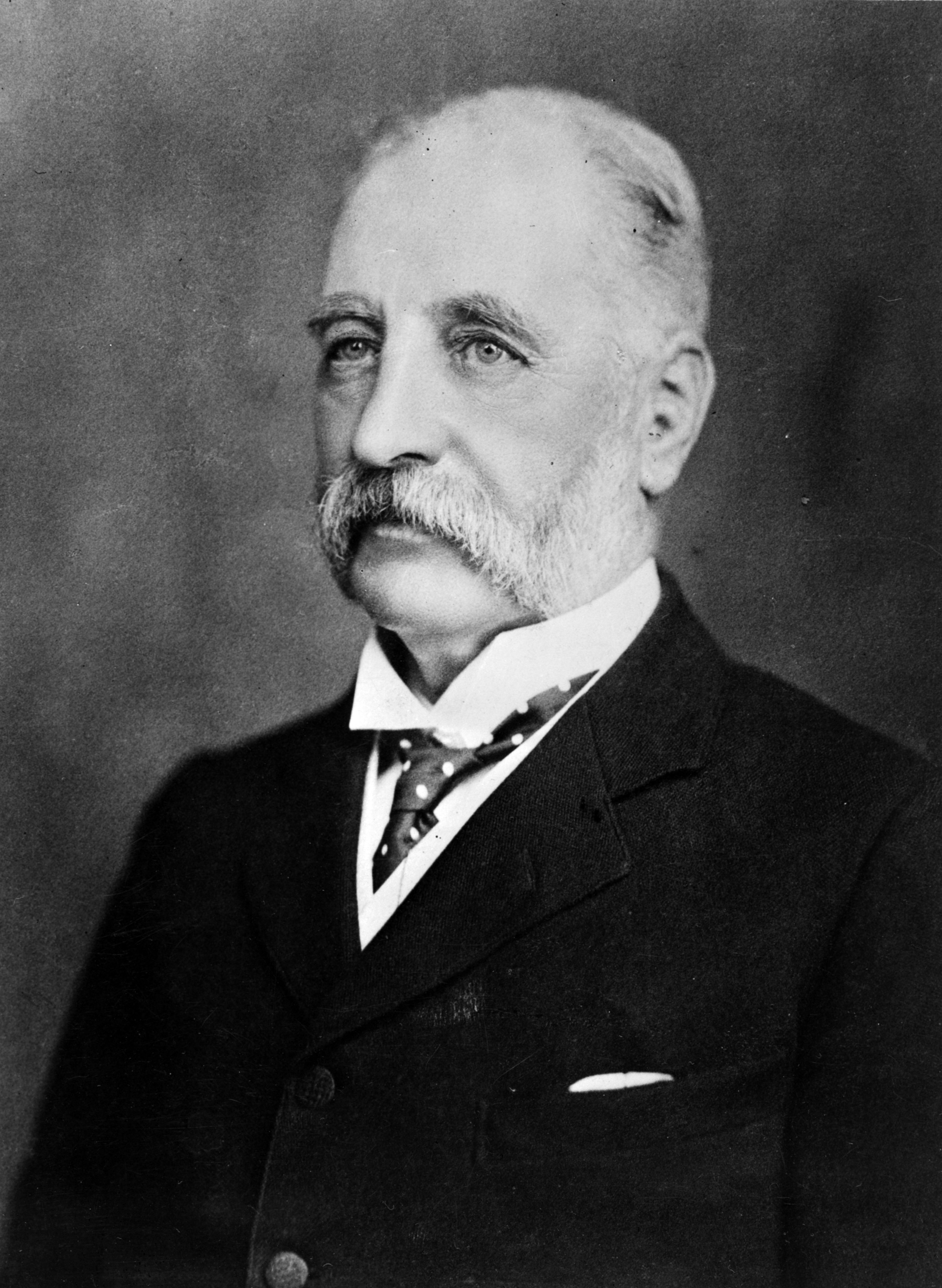
Sir James Hector

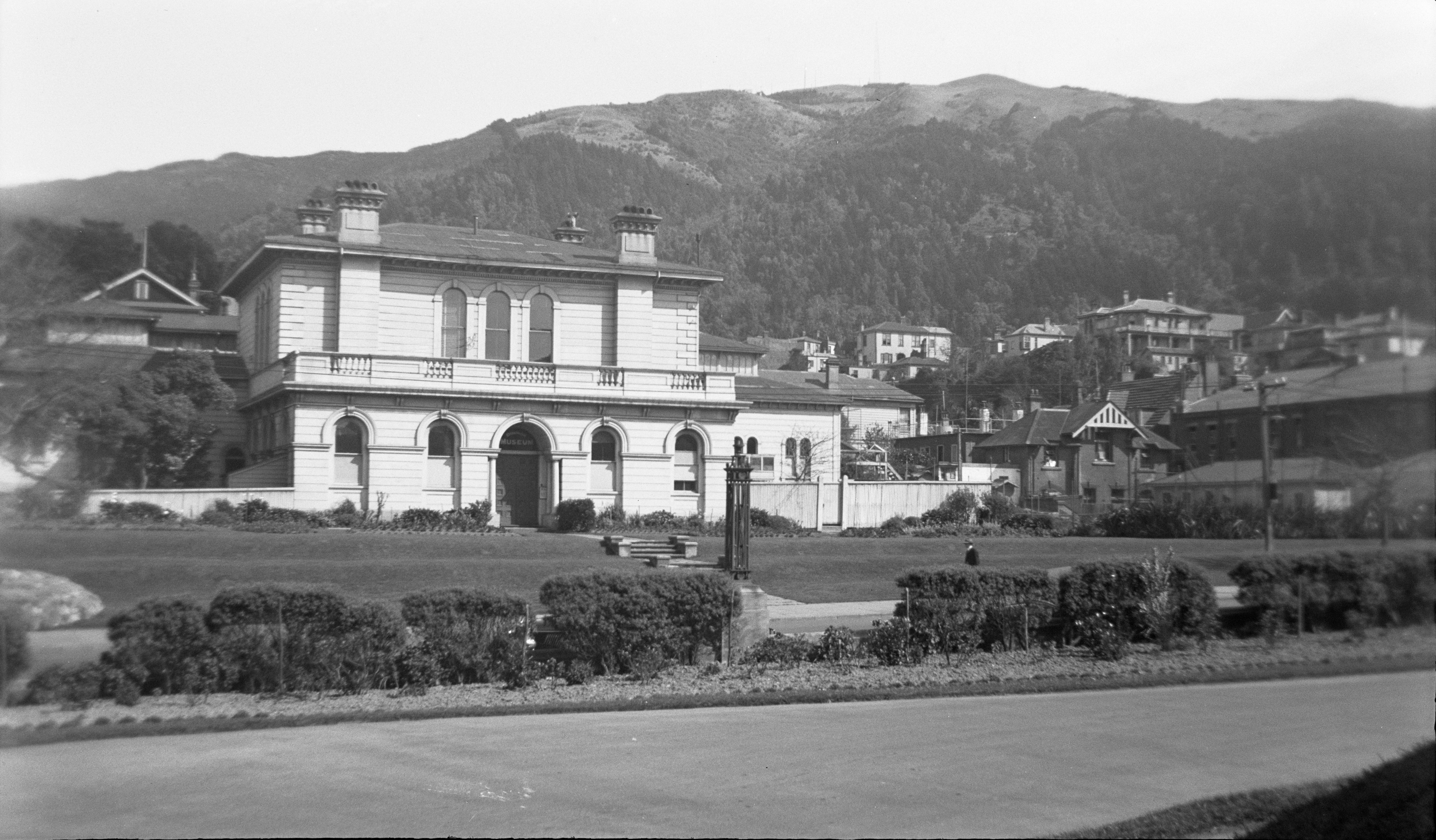
Entrance to the Dominion Museum previously Colonial Museum in Museum Street, Thorndon

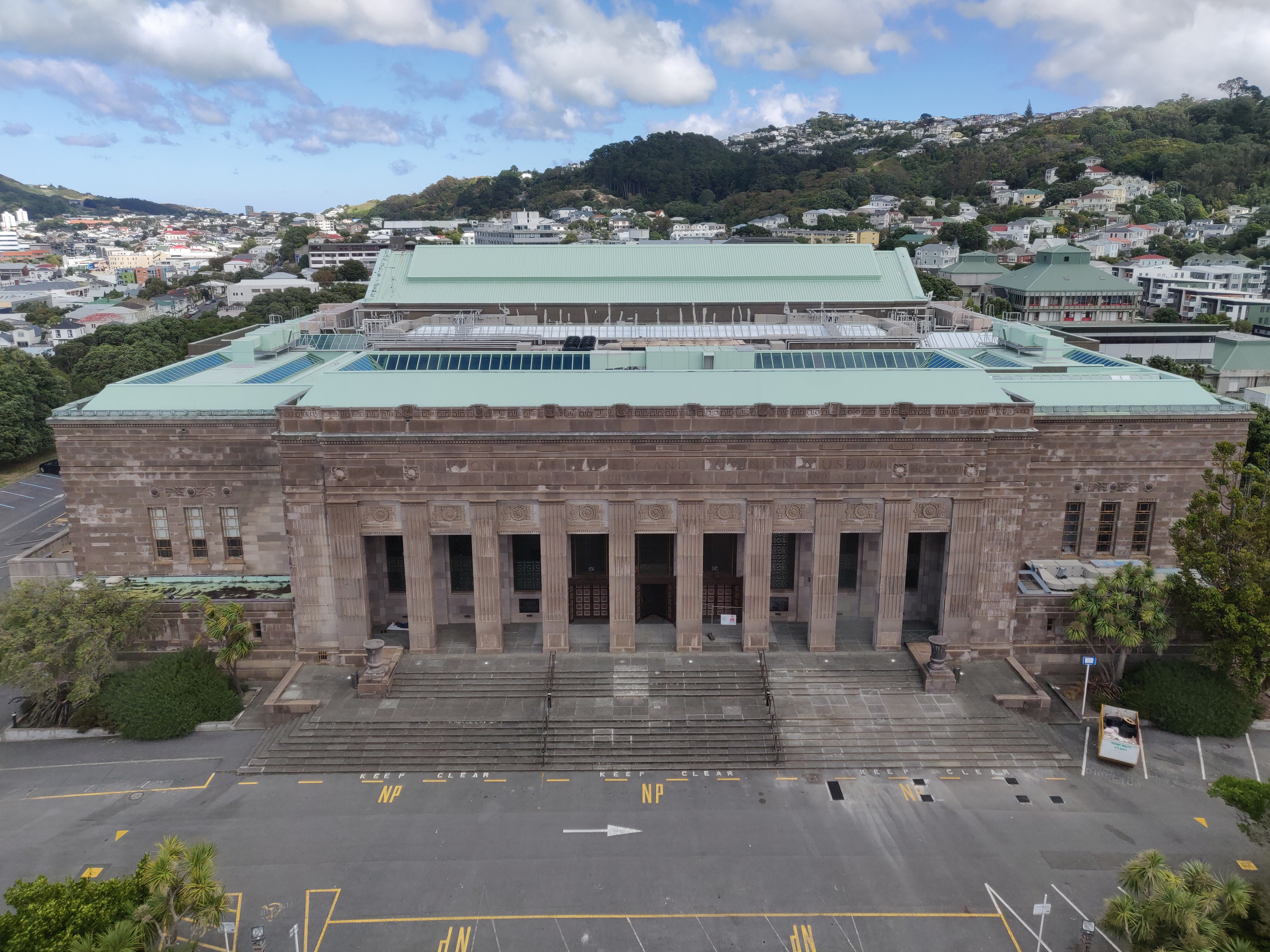
Dominion Museum

=== Colonial Museum ===
The first predecessor to Te Papa was the Colonial Museum, founded in 1865 with Sir James Hector as founding director. The museum was built on Museum Street, roughly in the location of the present day Defence House office building. The museum prioritised scientific collections but also acquired a range of other items, often by donation, including prints and paintings, ethnographic curiosities, and items of antiquity. In 1907, the Colonial Museum was renamed the Dominion Museum and took on a broader focus. The idea of developing a public art gallery in Wellington was gathering support, and the Science and Art Act of 1913 paved the way for a national art gallery in the same building.

=== Co-location with National Art Gallery ===
Following the passing of the National Art Gallery and Dominion Museum Act in 1930, the two institutions shared a single board of trustees. In 1934, the National Art Gallery moved into the Dominion Museum building at Museum Street and incorporated the New Zealand Academy of Fine Arts, which sold its land and donated the proceeds to the new organisation together with an initial collection. The early holdings consisted largely of donations and bequests, including those from Harold Beauchamp, T. Lindsay Buick, Archdeacon Smythe, N. Chevalier, J. C. Richmond, William Swainson, Bishop Monrad, John Ilott and Rex Nan Kivell. In 1936, a new Dominion Museum building to house both collections opened in Buckle Street as a part of the newly built National War Memorial.

In 1985 a temporary exhibition space venue was added to the National Art Gallery. Shed 11 the Temporary/Contemporary was situated on the Wellington waterfront in a converted industrial warehouse built in 1905 and until 1992 exhibited local and international contemporary art.

Eru D. Gore was secretary-manager from 1936 until his death in 1948 when Stewart Maclennan was appointed the first director. This was the first appointment in New Zealand of a full-time art gallery director. Other past directors of the gallery include:

- Stewart Maclennan (1948–68)
- Melvin Day (1968–78)
- Luit Bieringa (1979–89)
- Jenny Harper (1990–92)

=== Te Papa ===
Te Papa was established in 1992 by the Museum of New Zealand Te Papa Tongarewa Act 1992. Part of the remit for Te Papa was to explore the national identity of New Zealand. The museum uses the tag line 'Our Place' to reflect its mission to be "relevant and accessible to as many people as possible".

Te Papa Tongarewa translates literally to 'container of treasures' or in full 'container of treasured things and people that spring from mother Earth here in New Zealand'. The shortened and more commonly used 'Te Papa' refers to "foundations, a place to stand, or earth mother". The Māori name of the museum was controversial. In 1989 the Māori iwi Te Āti Awa requested that the Ngāti Whakaue iwi grant a name to the museum, which resulted in Ngāti Whakaue bestowing the name Kuru Tongarerewa, an ancient ceremonial name important to the iwi evoking spiritual, historical, and cultural importance. However, the name eventually adopted by the museum caused offense by being a modification in the form of Te Papa Tongarewa. Meetings between the museum's board and Ngāti Whakaue led to promises that the name would be changed to Te Papa Kuru Tongererewa, but the change did not occur.

The museum's logo, a stylised thumbprint designed by Saatchi & Saatchi, was also controversial when it was introduced due to its $200,000 cost and its similarity to existing logos.

The official opening took place on 14 February 1998, in a ceremony led by Prime Minister Jenny Shipley, Sir Peter Blake, and two children. Māori traditional instrumentalist Richard Nunns co-led musicians at a dawn ceremony on opening day. The museum had one million visitors in the first five months of operation, and between 1 and 1.3 million visits have been made in each subsequent year. Filmmakers Gaylene Preston and Anna Cottrell documented the development of Te Papa in their 2011 film Getting to Our Place.

=== Current building ===
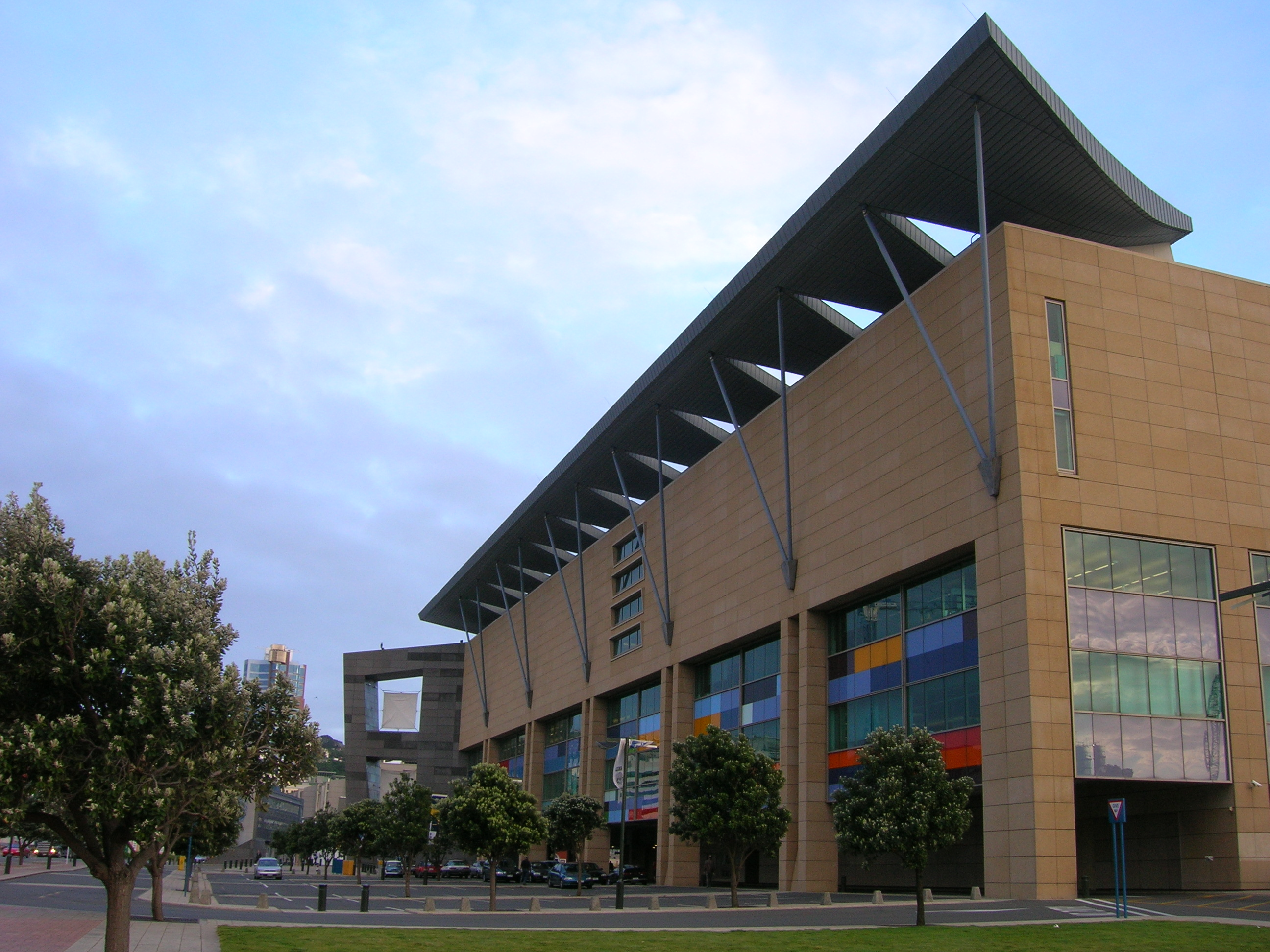
South-western view

The main Te Papa building is built on reclaimed land on Cable Street which formerly belonged to the Wellington Harbour Board. The site was previously occupied by the Museum Hotel, a modern five-storey building. Over a five-month period in 1993, the hotel was jacked off its foundations onto numerous rail bogies and transported 200 metres (660 ft) down and across the road to a new site, where it is now known as the QT Wellington Hotel. Once the site was clear, the soft reclaimed land was compacted to a depth of 16 metres by dropping weights of up to 30 tonnes from a height of up to 30 metres in a criss-cross pattern on the site. Over 50,000 weights were dropped, causing noise and vibration problems for those in surrounding buildings. The siting of significant collections at the water's edge on reclaimed land next to one of the world's most active faults concerned some people including Michael Trotter, then-director of the Canterbury Museum. Earthquake strengthening of the Cable Street building was achieved through the New Zealand-developed technology of base isolation. Visitors to the museum can enter an underground area called 'Quake Braker' to view some of the base isolators.

Te Papa was designed by Pete Bossley of Jasmax Architects and built by Fletcher Construction. The design process of the building followed bicultural principles based on the Treaty of Waitangi. This process was led by Cliff Whiting working alongside Cheryll Sotheran and Ken Gorbey. The building won New Zealand Institute of Architects regional awards in 1999 and was voted New Zealand's 'Building of the Decade' in an Architecture NZ readers' poll in 2000.

The 36,000-square-metre (390,000 sq ft) building had cost NZ$300 million by its opening in 1998. The building contains six floors of exhibitions, cafés and gift shops dedicated to New Zealand's culture, history and environment. When it opened in 1998, the museum had a fine-dining restaurant called Icon, but this later closed. The museum also incorporates outdoor areas with artificial caves, native bushes and wetlands. 'Bush City', an outdoor exhibition area featuring native plants in various habitats, was designed by environmental consulatants Boffa Miskell.

From 2004 to 2012, more space was devoted to exhibiting works from the New Zealand art collection in a long-term exhibition called Toi Te Papa: Art of the Nation. This was replaced in 2018 by Toi Art, new galleries for art on levels 4 and 5 that enable the display of more artworks from the collection.

A second building on Tory Street is a scientific research facility and storage area, and is not open to the public.

== Governance and leadership ==
The museum is run by a board appointed by the Minister for Arts, Culture and Heritage. Board members have included: Wira Gardiner, Fiona Campbell, Sue Piper, Judith Tizard, John Judge, Miria Pomare, Michael Bassett, Christopher Parkin, Sandra Lee, Ngātata Love, Ron Trotter, Glenys Coughlan, Judith Binney, Philip Carter, Wendy Lai and Api Mahuika.

Directors of the museum include:

- James Hector (1865–1903)
- Augustus Hamilton (1903–1913)
- James Allan Thomson (1914–1928)
- Walter Oliver (1928–1947)
- Robert Falla (1947–1966)
- John Yaldwyn (1980–1989)

CEOs of Te Papa include:

- Cheryll Sotheran (1992–2002)
- Cliff Whiting (1995–1999) – joint CEO or Kaihautū
- Seddon Bennington (2003 – July 2009)
- Michael Houlihan (Aug 2010 – May 2014)
- Rick Ellis (Nov 2014 – May 2017)
- Geraint Martin (May 2017 – 2019)
- Courtney Johnston (2019–present) and Arapata Hakiwai (Kaihautū, Māori co-leader) (2014–present).

=== Staffing issues ===
Staff restructuring at Te Papa since 2012 has generated significant controversy. In February 2019, the Collection Manager of Fishes Andrew Stewart and the Collection Manager of Molluscs Bruce Marshall were made redundant, though Stewart was later reinstated. Numerous museum experts and scientists in New Zealand and worldwide criticised the move, with researchers advocating a boycott. Te Papa's handling of the situation prompted moa expert Trevor Worthy to end his 30-year research association with the museum in protest.

== Collections ==
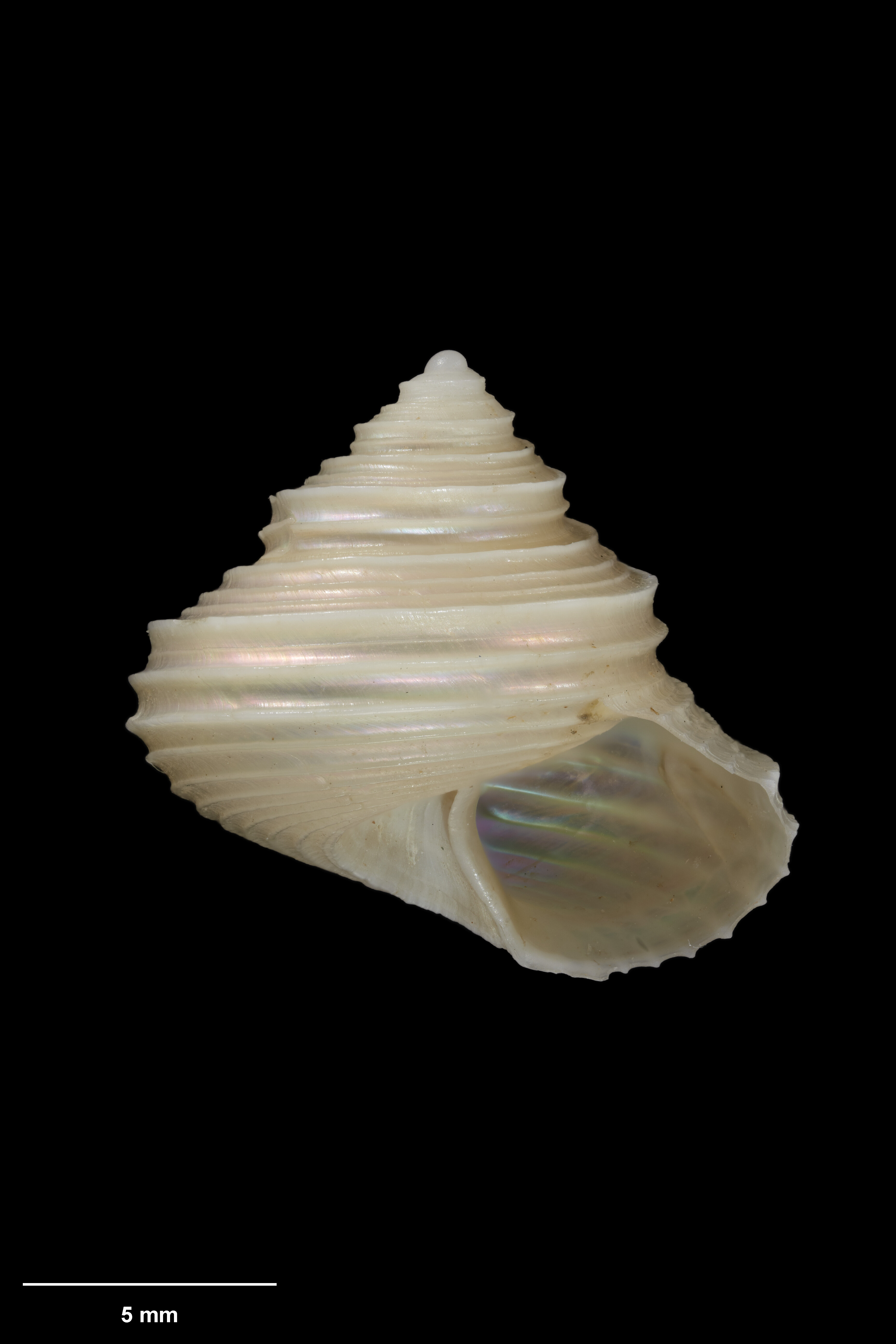
Falsimargarita callista specimen, the one millionth object placed on the Te Papa Collections Online website

The History Collection includes many dresses and textiles, the oldest of which date back to the sixteenth century. The History Collection also includes the New Zealand Post Archive with around 20,000 stamps and related objects, and the Pacific Collection has about 13,000 historic and contemporary items from the Pacific Islands.

The history of Te Papa's foreign ethnology collections (excluding those from the Pacific) mirrors, in broad terms, the developmental patterns seen in New Zealand's other major metropolitan museums—Otago Museum, Canterbury Museum, and Auckland Museum. However, each institution has followed a distinct historical trajectory. Due to its early policies and collecting practices, Te Papa holds smaller and more fragmented foreign ethnology collections than the other three. Unlike them, Te Papa acquired most of its material through passive means rather than proactive collection efforts.

There are significant collections of fossils and archaeozoology; a herbarium of about 250,000 dried specimens (Index Herbariorum code WELT); a collection of about 70,000 specimens of New Zealand birds; significant amphibians, reptiles and mammals.

Molluscan holotypes, neotypes, lectotypes and syntypes are held by the Museum of New Zealand.

The museum has the world's largest specimen of the rare colossal squid (Mesonychoteuthis hamiltoni). It weighs 495 kilograms (1,091 lb) and is 4.2 metres (14 ft) long. The squid arrived at the museum in March 2007 after being captured by New Zealand fishers in the Ross Sea off Antarctica. The cultural collections include collections on photography, Māori taonga (cultural treasures), and Pacific cultures.

The Museum of New Zealand is also home to the Elgar Collection, a valuable collection of English and French furniture and paintings, the oldest of which date back to the seventeenth century. In 1946 the Dominion Museum received a bequest of some of Fernside Homestead's finest antiques from Ella Elgar's will. Until 1992 these antiques were displayed in period rooms at the Dominion Museum, and objects from the Elgar Collection are currently exhibited throughout Te Papa.

== Exhibitions ==
Te Papa's exhibits range from long-term exhibitions on New Zealand's natural environment and social history, to cultural spaces and touring/temporary exhibitions. Most are hands-on and interactive. The long-term exhibitions of cultural objects focus on New Zealand history, Māori culture and New Zealand's natural world. The hands-on and interactive exhibitions focus on engaging young visitors and include outdoor areas built and planted for Te Papa. There has been criticism of the "sideshow" nature of some exhibits, primarily the Time Warp section, which has since closed. New Zealand art commentator Hamish Keith, a member of the board that set up the Museum of New Zealand and a member of its interim board, has been a consistent critic of Te Papa, at different times referring to it as a "theme park", the "cultural equivalent to a fast-food outlet" and "not even a de facto national gallery", but seemed to moderate his opinion later when making a case for exhibition space on the Auckland waterfront. There has also been criticism that some exhibits were not given due reverence. For example, a major work by Colin McCahon was at one stage juxtaposed with a 1950s refrigerator in a New Zealand culture exhibition.

The key cultural space is the Rongomaraeroa marae with unusual whakairo in its wharenui, Te Hono ki Hawaiki.

In 2018, the Mountains to Sea and Awesome Forces exhibits were closed, with Te Taiao Nature taking their place. This new exhibit opened on 11 May 2019, with a 1,400 square-metre exhibition focusing on New Zealand's natural environment. The exhibition retains several features of the old exhibits, such as an earthquake house simulation and a 495 kilogram (1,091 lb) colossal squid.

In 2022, the Manu Rere Moana exhibition was renewed to reflect developments in traditional navigation since its initial installation.

In 2023, Te Papa stated that its most successful exhibitions during its first 25 years were:

- Gallipoli: The Scale of Our War, an exhibition created with Weta Workshop that opened in April 2015 and had been visited by almost four million people by 2023.
- The Lord of the Rings Motion Picture Trilogy: The Exhibition, 2002, more than 219,500 visitors.
- Terracotta Warriors: Guardians of Immortality, 2018, almost 200,000 visitors.

A full list of past exhibitions can be found here.

== Controversies ==
The museum's exhibitions have sometimes been controversial.

=== Virgin in a condom ===
British artist Tania Kovats' exhibition, Pictura Britannica, and in particular the piece Virgin in a Condom, infuriated many in the Christian community and sparked protests and counter protests a month after Te Papa opened its doors in 1998. A nationwide petition was circulated calling for the work's removal. Protesters congregated on the forecourt outside, increasing in number after The Christian Action group took out a full-page advertisement in The Dominion newspaper inviting people to join their protest. They threatened to take Te Papa to court on the grounds of "blasphemous libel", a 1961 Crimes Act offence against "religion, morality and public welfare". Te Papa staff also became the target of abusive and threatening phone calls and letters. The exhibit was guarded after being physically attacked, and following that, a guard working at the site was assaulted.

Te Papa refused to remove the offending artwork. The museum welcomed protestors back, stating that the museum's aim was not to offend, but to stimulate debate as a forum. However, they stipulated that debate would not concern the removal of the artwork, but only its meanings and interpretation, claiming that, "the people of New Zealand would want the museum to take a strong position on this, not to succumb to intimidation as some other museums have". The move sought to align Te Papa with other art museums that have taken the side of artistic freedom in spite of well publicised protest (the statuette was banned in Adelaide, stolen in Sydney, and dropped from its British tour).

The leader of the Christian Heritage Party stated that the sacrilegious display of the statuette was hypocritical, given that the museum is careful not to offend sensitivities about Māori spirituality. With the help of TV3, Te Papa organised a panel discussion including protesters to try and defuse the situation. Curator Ian Wedde also undertook to consider a more cautious approach with contemporary art exhibitions, saying "in future, we may have to say there's a risk management factor to consider".

=== Behind the scenes tour advice for women ===
Advice for pregnant and menstruating women to avoid a behind-the-scenes tour of some of Te Papa's collections in 2010 had some questioning if this was appropriate inclusiveness for a national museum. A Te Papa spokeswoman at the time said the policy was in place because of Māori beliefs surrounding the taonga collection included in the tour "for their own safety". This generated outrage, with claims that Te Papa was overbearing in terms of political correctness.

=== William Strutt painting dispute ===
Taranaki tribal elders raised objections to a 19th-century Te Papa-owned painting that the museum planned to lend to the Govett-Brewster Art Gallery in New Plymouth in 2019, saying it showed Māori as thieves and robbers and was therefore racist. Te Papa said it hoped the piece, View of Mt Egmont, Taranaki, New Zealand, taken from New Plymouth, with Maoris driving off settlers' cattle, painted by William Strutt, would spark a conversation about historical perspectives.

=== Te Taiao water quality falsification ===
In 2019, the museum faced criticism from farmers and National Party MP Todd Muller over a container of brown-dyed water which was part of a display in the museum's Te Taiao Nature exhibition. This water was labelled as undrinkable "water from a typical farm stream" and shown with an image of a cow defecating in a waterway. Te Papa spokeswoman Kate Camp said that the bottles had been created for display purposes only and were not real samples. Camp stated that "this display is about telling the story of New Zealand waterways. It's based on robust research that shows that many waterways in New Zealand—in urban and rural areas—aren't fit to drink or to swim in".

=== Exposure of adult content to children ===
In 2020, several children were exposed to a video of a nude man with exposed genitalia, part of Lemi Ponifasio's MAU: House of Night and Day exhibit, leading to families to complain about a lack of warning messages. Te Papa head of art Charlotte Davy said the museum would be making warning signs more obvious and installing new ones.

=== Te Tiriti o Waitangi exhibition protest ===
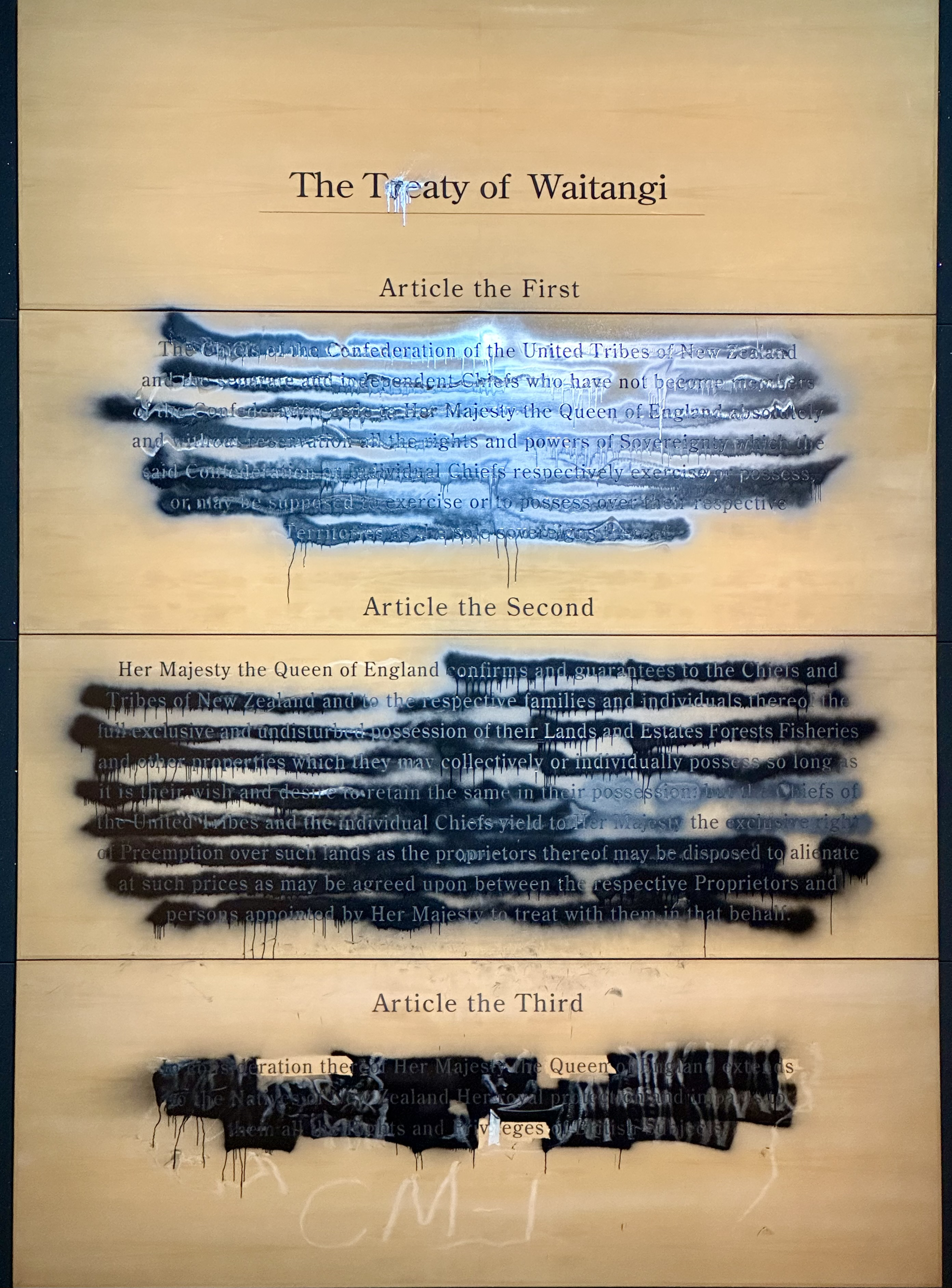
Vandalised 'Signs of a Nation' display in December 2023

On 11 December 2023, a wooden display panel showing an English version of the Treaty of Waitangi at the museum's Signs of a Nation Te Tiriti o Waitangi exhibition was damaged and partially blacked out with spray paint and an angle grinder by protesters from a group called Te Waka Hourua. The group had demanded the panel's removal from display for allegedly misleading visitors into thinking that it was a translation of the document. Twelve people were arrested. Museum officials said that they acknowledged the group's message and said that they were renewing the display, adding that the damaged panel would remain on display in its current form over the 2023–2024 summer.

== Digital museum Te Papa Huia ==
Te Papa hosts a digital museum named Te Papa Huia which provides online access to blogs, learning opportunities, and curated stories about the Māori world, natural history, social history, art and other topics. The digital museum includes Collections Online which provides information about over one million objects in the collection and 400,000 images, many of which can be downloaded in high resolution.

== Archives ==
Te Papa's archives are located in a separate building at 169 Tory Street and are open for researchers by appointment. There are two categories of archive collections: the Museum Archive and the Collected Archives.

The Museum Archive goes back to the founding of the Colonial Museum in 1865 and comprises the archives of James Hector. The archives of the National Art Gallery of New Zealand are also part of these archives. The Collected Archives fall into two groups:

1. Art-related records and other archival papers in specialist areas; for instance the archives of Toss Woollaston, Lois White and Leonard Mitchell
2. A wide variety of archival material that includes the diary of Felton Mathew, Surveyor General at the time of the signing of the Treaty of Waitangi, and battle plans and correspondences related to World War I; for instance the Gallipoli diary of Captain (later Major) Edward Percy Cox.

== Library ==
Te Aka Matua Research Library, previously a publicly accessible library, is now open by appointment only, between 10am-5pm, Monday-Friday. The library is a major research and reference resource, with particular strengths in New Zealand, Māori, natural history, art, photography and museum studies. It is located on the fourth floor of the main building.

== Mahuki innovation accelerator ==
Mahuki was Te Papa's innovation accelerator. It was an in-residence programme in which 10 teams developed solutions to challenges facing cultural institutions.

== See also ==
- List of national galleries
- Rongomaraeroa, the contemporary marae of Te Papa
- Tales from Te Papa, a television series about objects from the collection
