= 1865 Rangitikei by-election =

New Zealand by-election

The 1865 Rangitikei by-election was a by-election held on 10 July 1865 in the Rangitikei electorate during the 3rd New Zealand Parliament.

The by-election was caused by the resignation of the incumbent MP William Fox.

The by-election was won by Robert Pharazyn. As he was the only candidate nominated, he was duly declared elected.
