= Tauwharenīkau River =

Tauwharenīkau River Tauherenikau River
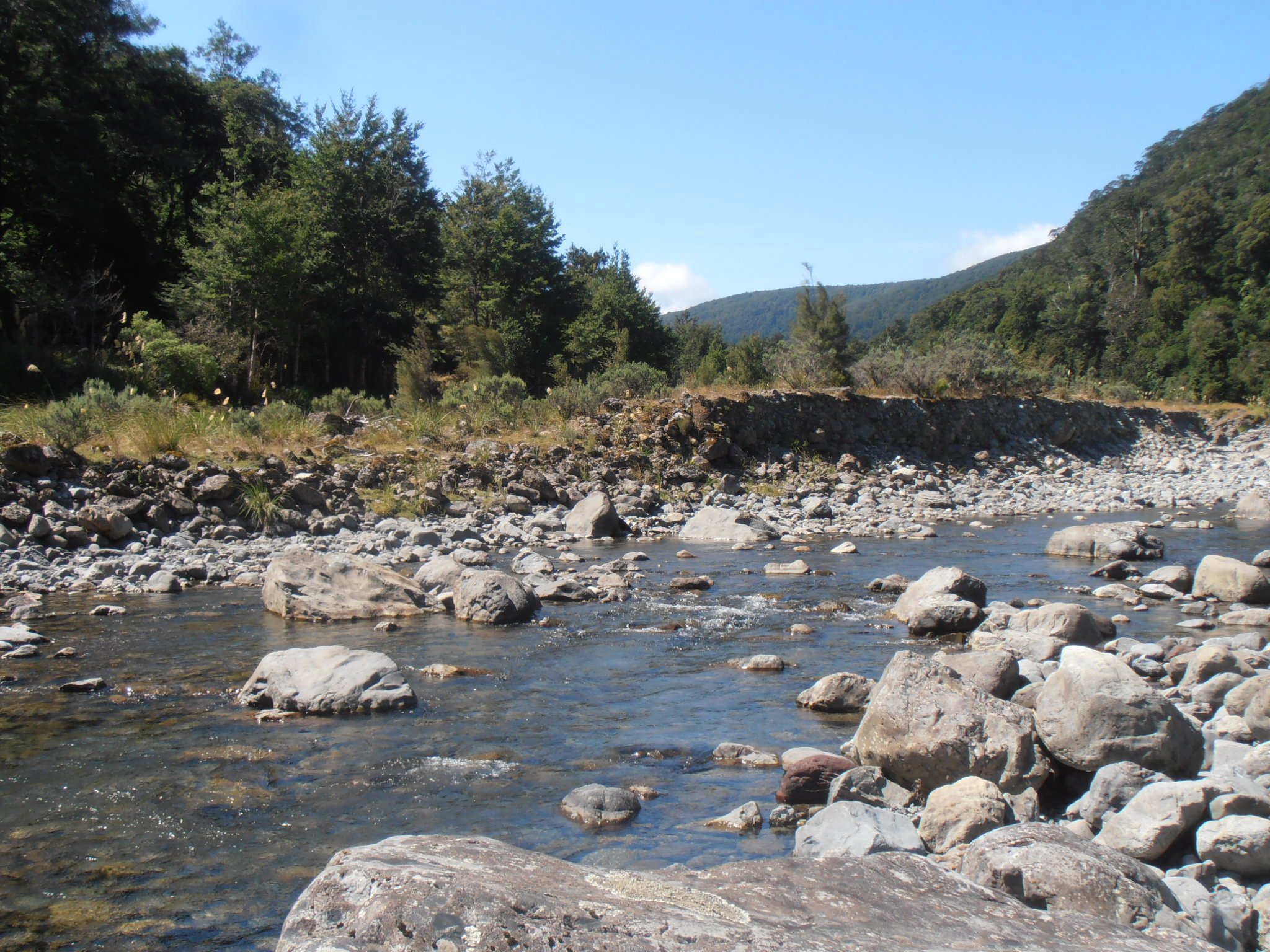
- The Tauwharenīkau River near Tutuwai Hut in the Tararua Range
- Route of the Tauwharenīkau River
- Mouth of the Tauwharenīkau River Tauwharenīkau River (North Island)
- Native name: Tauwharenīkau (Māori)

Location
- Country: New Zealand
- Island: North Island
- Region: Wellington
- District: South Wairarapa

Physical characteristics
- Source: Tararua Range
  - location: Mount Hector
  - coordinates: 40.95248°S 175.28442°E
- Mouth: Lake Wairarapa
  - coordinates: 41°10′30″S 175°18′45″E
- Length: 41 km (25 mi)

Basin features
- Progression: Tauwharenīkau River → Lake Wairarapa → Lake Wairarapa Outlet → Ruamāhanga River → Lake Ōnoke → Lake Ōnoke Outlet → Palliser Bay → Cook Strait → Pacific Ocean
- Cities: Tauwharenīkau
- Tributaries
  - left: Josephson Creek, Reeves Stream, Tutuwai Stream, Slip Stream, Rodgers Stream, Fan Stream, Bates Stream, Taits Stream
  - right: Bull Mound Creek, Omega Creek, Gorge Stream, Kōtukutuku Stream, Blue Rock Stream, Boulder Stream, Marchant Stream, Wiersma Stream, Smith Creek
- Bridges: Wairarapa Line railway bridge, Tauwharenīkau Suspension Bridge, Tauherenikau Bridge (State Highway 2), Tauherenikau River Bridge (State Highway 53)

The Tauwharenīkau River, formerly known as the Tauherenikau River, is a river of the Wellington Region of New Zealand's North Island. It flows initially southeast from its sources on the slopes of Mount Hector before turning southwest to run down a long valley in the Tararua Range. From the end of the valley it again turns southeast, flowing past the town of Featherston before reaching the northern shore of Lake Wairarapa.

On 7 March 2023, the name of the river was officially altered to Tauwharenīkau River, following the enactment of the Ngāti Kahungunu ki Wairarapa Tāmaki nui-a-Rua Claims Settlement Act 2022.

== See also ==
- List of rivers of Wellington Region
- List of rivers of New Zealand
