= Robert Pharazyn =

New Zealand politician

The Honourable Robert Pharazyn
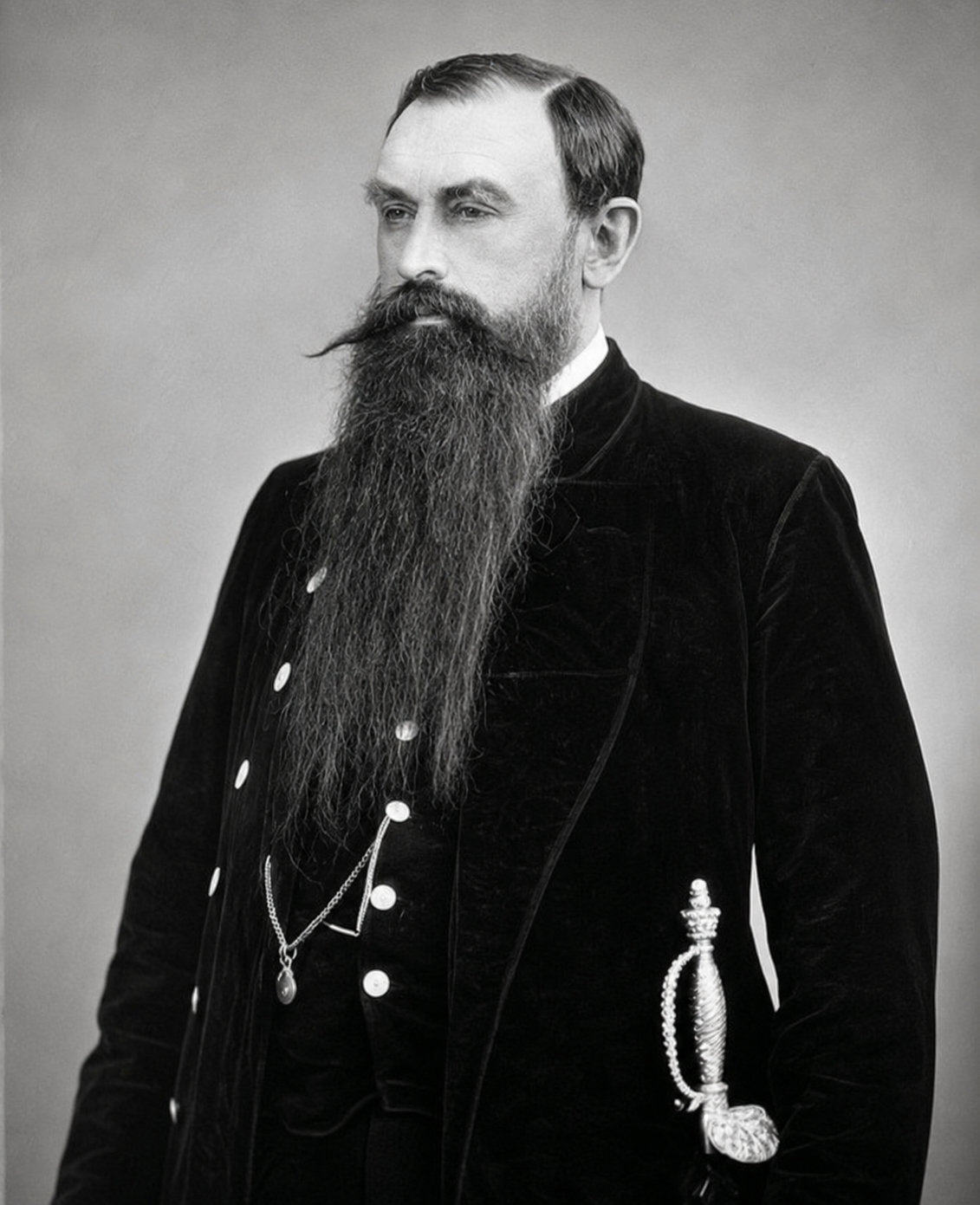

Personal details
- Born: 31 August 1833 London, England
- Died: 19 July 1896 (aged 62) Wellington, New Zealand
- Relatives: Charles Johnson Pharazyn (father)
- Occupation: Politician

Robert Pharazyn (31 August 1833 – 19 July 1896) was a 19th-century member of Parliament in the Manawatū region of New Zealand.

== Biography ==
New Zealand Parliament
Years	Term	Electorate	Party
1865–1866	3rd	Rangitikei	Independent

Pharazyn was born in London, England in 1833, the son of Charles Johnson Pharazyn. The family emigrated to New Zealand in 1841. He represented the Rangitikei electorate from 1865 to 1866 when he was defeated. In 1866, he became a Fellow of the Royal Geographical Society. In 1871, he married Emily Lomax (née Cole; 1821–1919). In 1874, he served as mayor of Wanganui. On 15 May 1885, Pharazyn was appointed to the New Zealand Legislative Council; his father had resigned from the Legislative Council, so that he could succeed him. He held that role until his death in Wellington on 19 July 1896. He was buried at Bolton Street Cemetery.

New Zealand Parliament
Preceded by William Fox	Member of Parliament for Rangitikei; 1865–1866	Succeeded by William Hogg Watt
