= State Highway 53 (New Zealand) =

Road in New Zealand

State Highway 53

Route information
- Maintained by NZ Transport Agency Waka Kotahi
- Length: 17.8 km (11.1 mi)
- Tourist routes: Classic New Zealand Wine Trail

Major junctions
- North end: SH 2 (Fitzherbert Street) at Featherston
- South end: Martinborough

Location
- Country: New Zealand
- Primary destinations: Featherston, Martinborough

Highway system
- New Zealand state highways; Motorways and expressways; List
← SH 52	→ SH 54

State Highway 53 (SH 53) is a New Zealand state highway linking SH 2 at Featherston with Martinborough. The highway is a 17.8 km long two lane carriageway and forms part of the Classic New Zealand Wine Trail.

== Route ==
SH 53 commences from SH 2 at the intersection of Fitzherbert and Revans Streets, Featherston. It proceeds along Revans Street until the intersection with Boundary Road, at which point the highway takes the name State Highway 53. The highway crosses two major rivers: the Tauherenikau River near Featherston and the Ruamāhanga River near Martinborough. West of the Ruamāhanga crossing it has a TOTSO intersection with Bidwills Crossing Road, which links Martinborough with Greytown. Upon reaching Martinborough, State Highway 53 becomes known as Kitchener Street until it reaches its terminus at Memorial Square.

== See also ==
- List of New Zealand state highways
