= Tauherenikau Racecourse =

Racecourse in New Zealand

Coordinates: 41°07′23.2″S 175°22′35.5″E

Tauherenikau
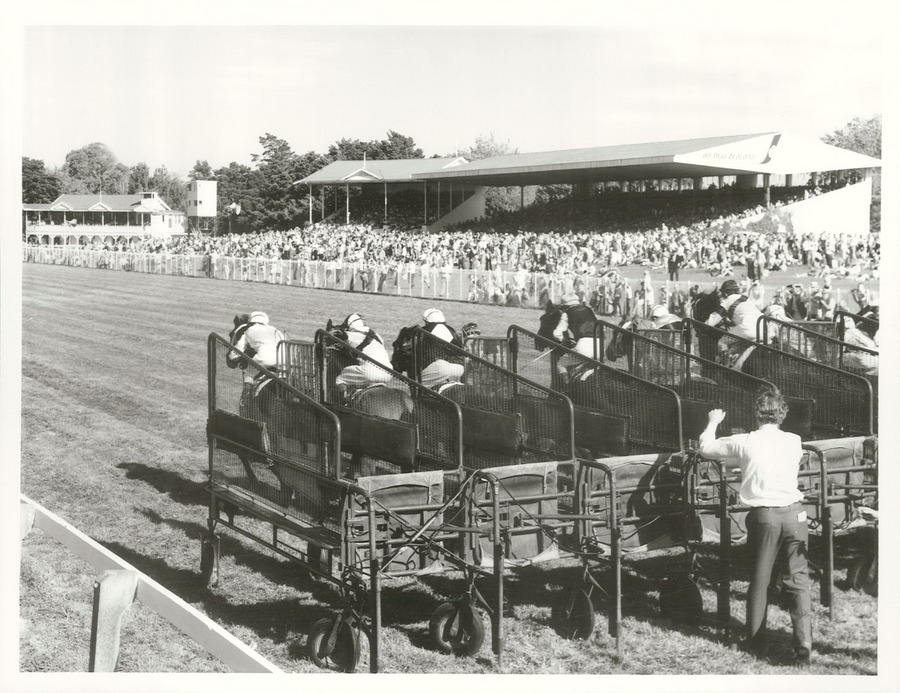
- The racecourse in 1977
- Interactive map of Tauherenikau
- Location: near Featherston, Wairarapa, New Zealand
- Owned by: Wairarapa Racing Club incorporated
- Date opened: 1874

Tauherenikau Racecourse is a racecourse near Featherston, New Zealand. It is owned by The Wairarapa Racing Club.

It is set in 110 acres of native trees.

== Wairarapa Racing Club ==
The Wairarapa Racing Club was formed on 21 April 1864 and held meetings elsewhere in the province. Work began on the Tauherenikau Racecourse in 1866 and was completed in 1874. Its first meeting at Tauherenikau was on January 26/27, 1874.

On 10 October 2019, all eight races were won by female jockeys: Rosie Myers (4 races), Lisa Allpress (2), Charlotte O'Beirne (apprentice) and Leah Mischewski.

In 2023, the club has three galloping meetings, the New Year meeting on 2 January, a Waitangi Day meeting (6 February) and Sunday 6 November.

== Masterton Jockey Club ==
The Masterton Opaki Jockey Club was formed in 1872. Racing began on the Opaki Race Course on Boxing Day in 1885 with trains traveling from Wellington for the occasion.

On 12 August 1896, the name was changed to the Masterton Racing Club and on 23 October 1987 the last meeting was held on the Opaki Course which then became a training centre. The Masterton Racing Club now race at Tauherenikau.

In 2023, the Masterton club has one race-day on 26 March.

== See also ==
- Thoroughbred racing in New Zealand
- Trentham Racecourse
