= Featherston, New Zealand =

Town in the Wellington Region, New Zealand

Featherston Paetūmōkai (Māori)
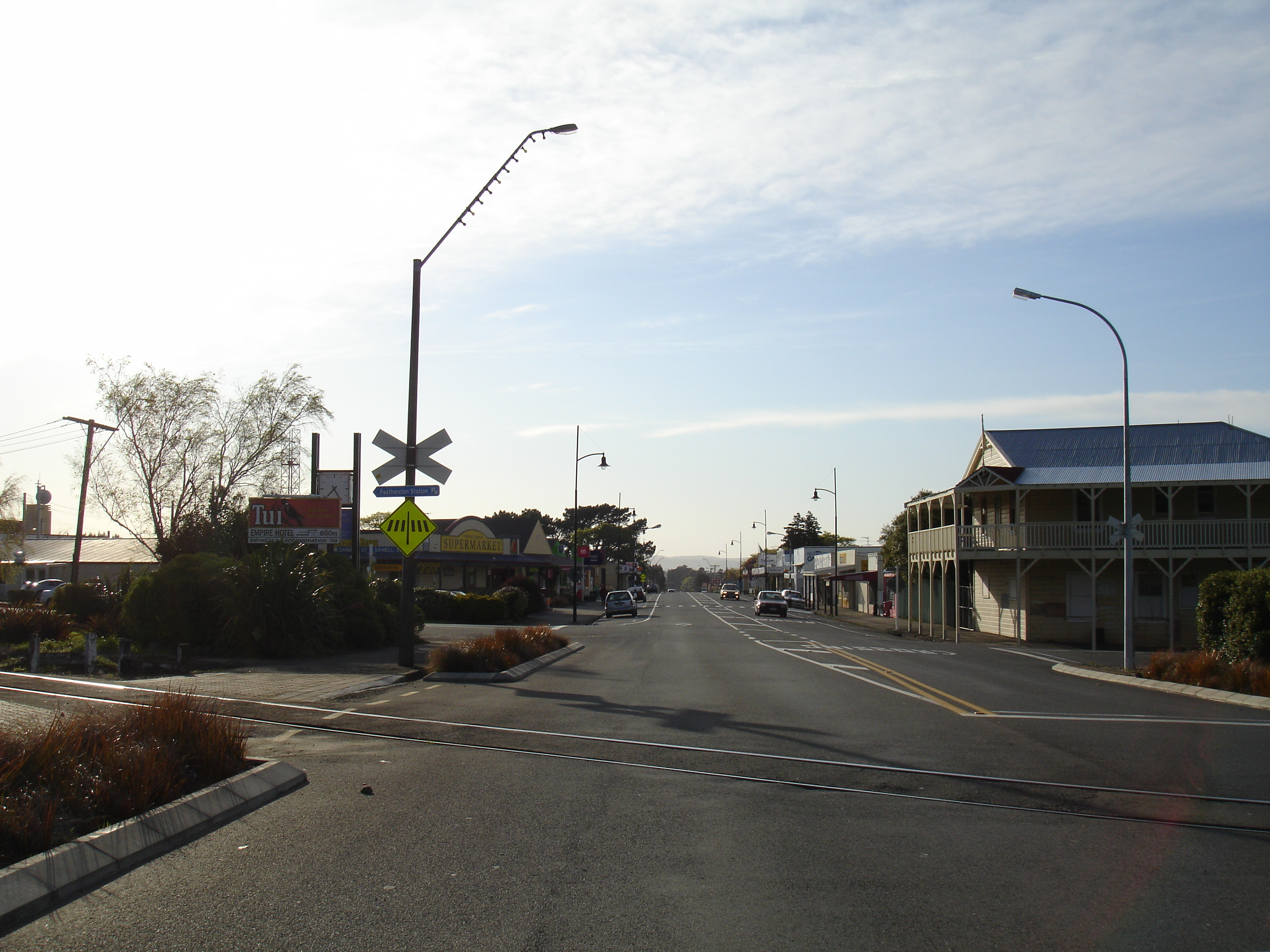
- Fitzherbert Street in Featherston
- Interactive map of Featherston
- Coordinates: 41°7′S 175°19′E
- Region: Wellington Region
- Territorial authority: South Wairarapa District
- Ward: Featherston Ward
- Community: Featherston Community
- Founded: 1856
- Named for: Isaac Featherston
- Electorates: Wairarapa; Ikaroa-Rāwhiti (Māori)

Government
  - Territorial Authority: South Wairarapa District Council
  - Regional council: Greater Wellington Regional Council
  - Mayor of South Wairarapa: Fran Wilde
  - Wairarapa MP: Mike Butterick
  - Ikaroa-Rāwhiti MP: Cushla Tangaere-Manuel

Area
  - Total: 3.19 km^{2} (1.23 sq mi)

Population (June 2025)
  - Total: 2,870
  - Density: 900/km^{2} (2,330/sq mi)
- Time zone: UTC+12 (NZST)
  - Summer (DST): UTC+13 (NZDT)
- Postcode(s): 5710
- Area code: 06

Featherston (Māori: Paetūmōkai) is a town in the South Wairarapa District, in the Wellington Region of New Zealand's North Island. It is at the eastern foothills of Remutaka Range close to the northern shore of Lake Wairarapa, 63 km (39 mi) north-east of central Wellington and 37 km (23 mi) south-west of Masterton.

The town has a population of 2,870 (June 2025). Featherston has increasingly become a satellite town of Wellington since the Remutaka rail tunnel opened in 1955; at the 2006 census, 36% of employed Featherston residents worked in Wellington and the Hutt Valley. This proximity to the capital, coupled with low house prices, made Featherston popular with writers, artists and those with young families, in turn leading to a recent upsurge in business investment and creative activity. From 2014 to 2019, housing prices in Featherston increased by 108% while rental prices went from an average of $140 to $400 in the same time period.

== History ==
Wairarapa Moana (Lake Wairarapa) was among the first areas settled in New Zealand, with sites dating back some 800 years. Fish and waterfowl were plentiful, but the major draw card was tuna – the native freshwater eel. Tuna could be caught in vast quantities during their seasonal migration to the sea, and the catch could be dried for storage or trading. Seasonal eeling settlements dotted the edge of Wairarapa Moana, with several permanent settlements on the surrounding higher ground.

The town of Featherston was first known as Burlings, after Henry Burling, who opened an accommodation house near the Māori settlement of Pae-O-Tu-Mokai in 1847. In 1856, the provincial government surveyed the spot for a town, naming it after its superintendent, Isaac Featherston.

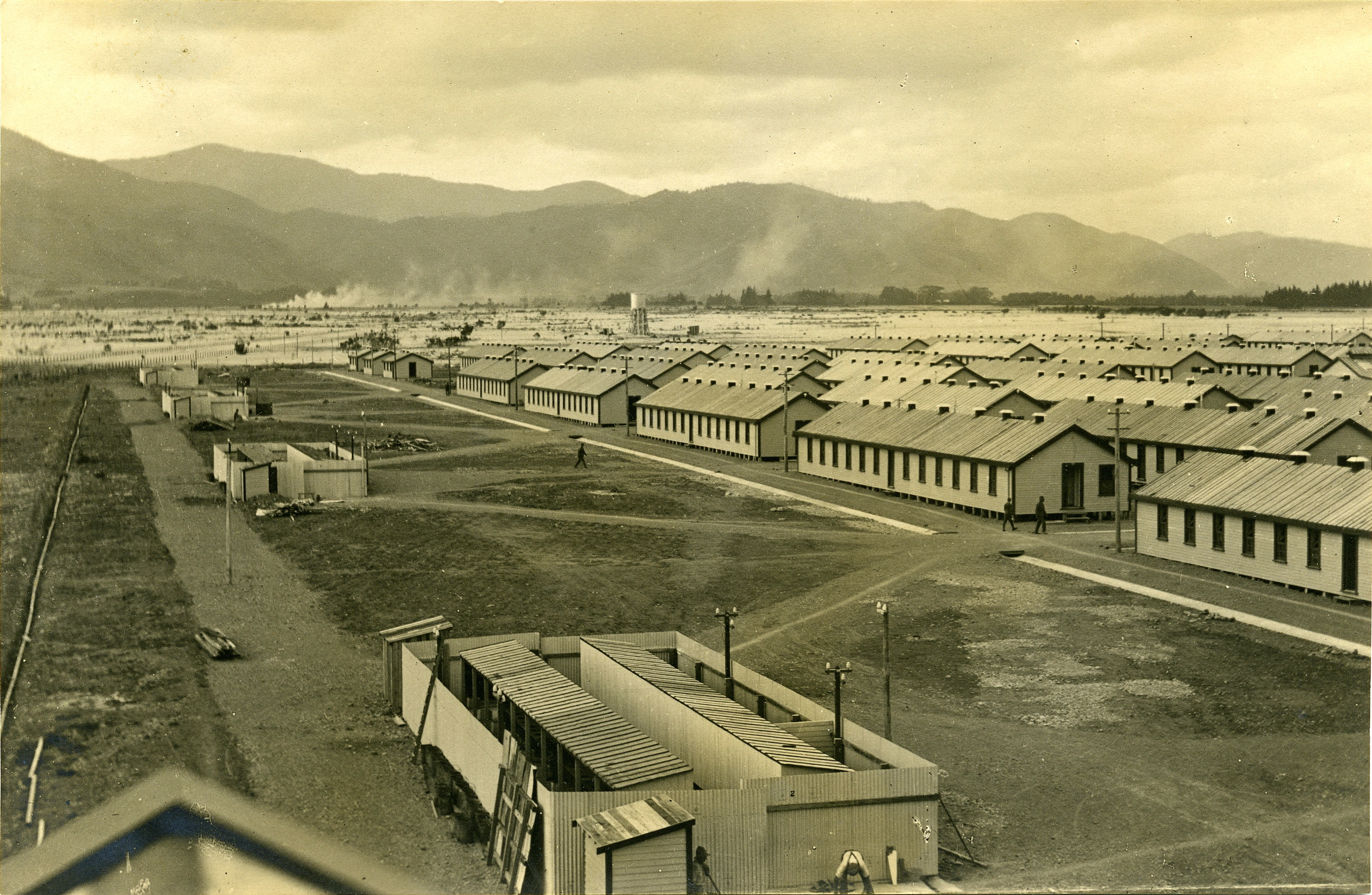
Featherston Camp in 1916

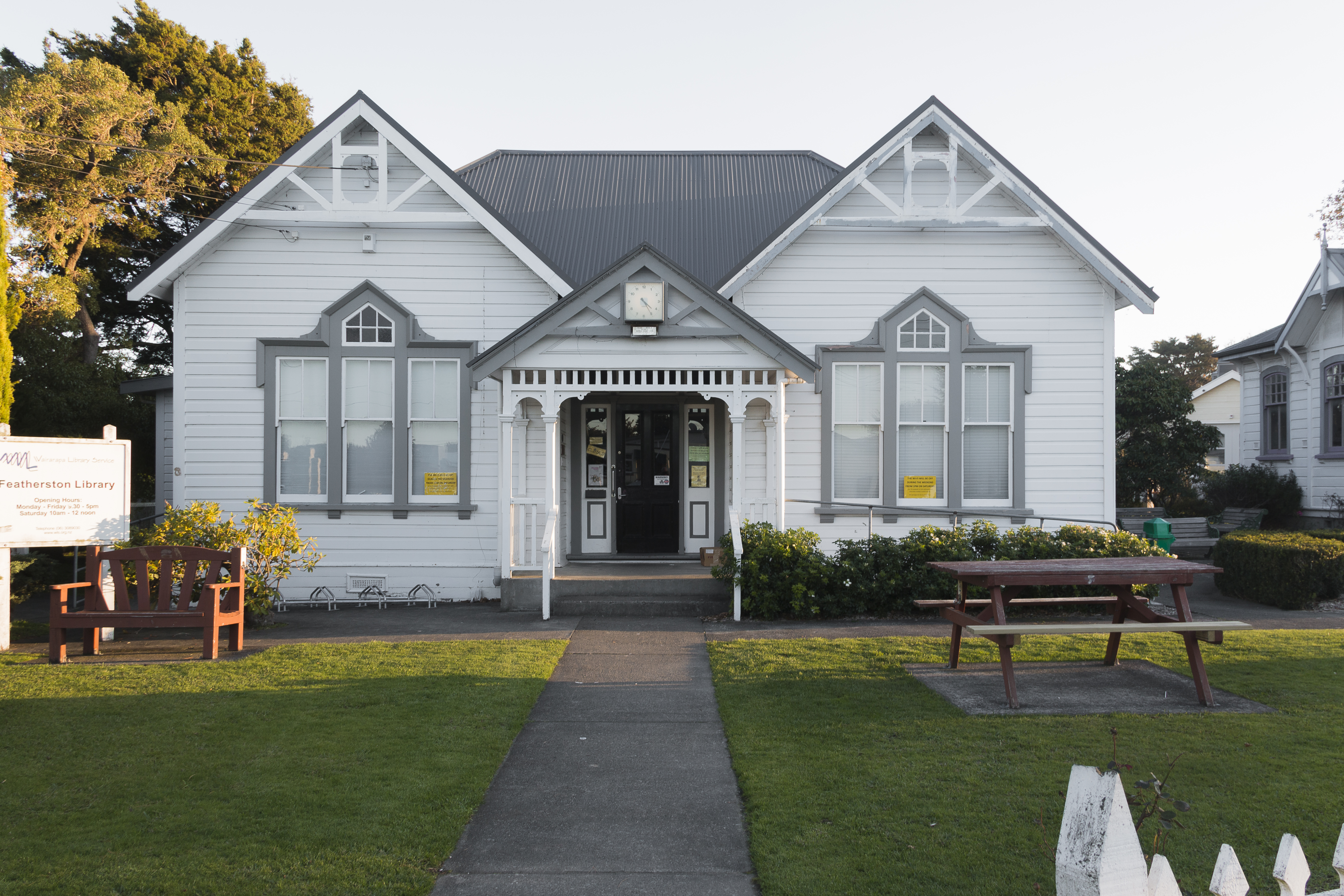
Featherston's library, Heritage register No 3976

The Featherston Military Camp was a major training camp in World War I, established in 1916 and housing up to 8000 men. The camp was larger than the town and included 16 dining halls, six cookhouses, 17 shops, a picture theatre, a hospital, and a post office. After training, infantrymen marched over the Remutaka Range for embarkation at Wellington.

During World War II, in 1942 it became the Featherston prisoner of war camp, holding 800 Japanese POWs captured in the South Pacific. On 25 February 1943, an incident occurred where 122 Japanese Prisoners of War in the camp were shot (48 dead, 74 wounded). Tension had been building for weeks before a group of recently arrived prisoners staged a sit-down strike and refused to work. Guards fired a warning shot, wounding Lieutenant Adachi Toshio. The prisoners then rose, and the guards opened fire. Wartime censors kept details of the incident quiet to prevent Japanese reprisals against Allied POWs. After the war, the first POW to return to Featherston burned incense at the site in 1974 and a joint New Zealand–Japanese project established a memorial ground, located 2 km north of the town on State Highway 2.

Featherston houses the world's only surviving Fell locomotive engine in the Fell Locomotive Museum. The locomotive system operated successfully for 77 years from 1878 to 1955. Remnants of the trains and the once busy settlement are visible on the Remutaka Rail Trail Cycleway.

Before 1989, Featherston was the namesake of Featherston County. It also had its own borough, giving it a borough council and mayor.

== Demographics ==
Featherston covers 3.19 km^{2} (1.23 sq mi) and had an estimated population of 2,870 as of June 2025, with a population density of 900 people per km^{2}.

Historical population
Year	Pop.	±% p.a.
2006	2,343	—
2013	2,250	−0.58%
2018	2,487	+2.02%
2023	2,793	+2.35%

Featherston had a population of 2,793 in the 2023 New Zealand census, an increase of 306 people (12.3%) since the 2018 census, and an increase of 543 people (24.1%) since the 2013 census. There were 1,371 males, 1,401 females, and 21 people of other genders in 1,155 dwellings. 4.8% of people identified as LGBTIQ+. The median age was 41.3 years (compared with 38.1 years nationally). There were 555 people (19.9%) aged under 15 years, 378 (13.5%) aged 15 to 29, 1,347 (48.2%) aged 30 to 64, and 513 (18.4%) aged 65 or older.

People could identify as more than one ethnicity. The results were 87.3% European (Pākehā); 20.9% Māori; 4.1% Pasifika; 5.0% Asian; 1.0% Middle Eastern, Latin American and African New Zealanders (MELAA); and 1.7% other, which includes people giving their ethnicity as "New Zealander". English was spoken by 97.5%, Māori by 3.9%, Samoan by 0.9%, and other languages by 7.8%. No language could be spoken by 1.9% (e.g. too young to talk). New Zealand Sign Language was known by 0.4%. The percentage of people born overseas was 17.3, compared with 28.8% nationally.

Religious affiliations were 25.0% Christian, 0.8% Hindu, 0.9% Māori religious beliefs, 0.4% Buddhist, 0.8% New Age, 0.1% Jewish, and 1.3% other religions. People who answered that they had no religion were 61.3%, and 9.5% of people did not answer the census question.

Of those at least 15 years old, 525 (23.5%) people had a bachelor's or higher degree, 1,173 (52.4%) had a post-high school certificate or diploma, and 540 (24.1%) people exclusively held high school qualifications. The median income was $37,900, compared with $41,500 nationally. 246 people (11.0%) earned over $100,000 compared to 12.1% nationally. The employment status of those at least 15 was 1,056 (47.2%) full-time, 324 (14.5%) part-time, and 75 (3.4%) unemployed.

== Recreation, culture and sport ==
The Anzac Hall was built in 1916 to give ‘A place of resort, recreation and amusement for all those who are now or have been or may be during the term of the war employed in the military or naval service of the Crown’. A large, beautiful wooden hall with two smaller rooms, it was restored for its centennial and is a Category 1 historic place. It now serves as a town hall and community hub, used for concerts, events and meetings.

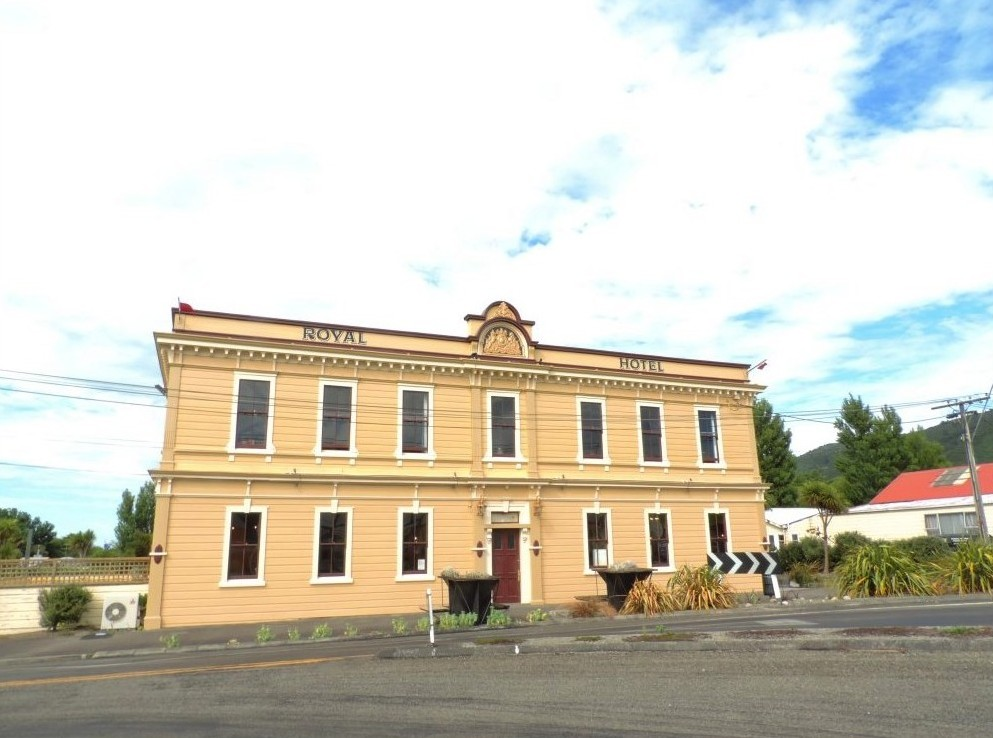
Royal Hotel, Featherston

Lake Wairarapa Domain is a popular recreation area for walks, cycling and motorcycling, plus fishing, birdwatching and exploring the wetlands.

In 2015, Featherston joined the Booktown movement, and hosts an annual literary festival and other bookish events through the year. Other annual events include winter's Time Traveller's Ball, a summer series of Featherston First Friday community arts nights, and the Cross Creek Rail Society's Mini Train Carnival. The Royal Hotel re-opened in December 2017 after extensive renovations, with a steampunk theme allowing them to pay homage to the town's literary and historical threads.

Featherston has various sporting clubs, including one of the oldest junior football clubs in the country, Featherston Junior FC can trace their club history back to 1856. Also, there's; a rugby union football club, a hockey club, athletics club, swimming club, football club and an indoor sports complex.

== Education ==
Featherston School Te Kura o Paetūmokai is a co-educational state primary school for Year 1 to 8 students, with a roll of 143 as of July 2026. It opened in 1863, and moved to the current site in 1923.

South Featherston School is a co-educational state primary school for Year 1 to 8 students, with a roll of 65. It opened in 1898.

St Teresa's School is a co-educational state-integrated Catholic school for Year 1 to 8 students, with a roll of 117. It opened in 1954.

Featherston District High School opened in 1923, and closed when Kuranui College opened in 1960.

== Transport ==
Featherston is at the junction of State Highway 2 and State Highway 53. SH 2 connects Featherston south to Wellington via the Remutaka Pass and the Hutt Valley, and north to Masterton via Greytown and Carterton and onwards to Woodville. SH 53 connects SH 2 and Featherston with Martinborough.

Featherston is served by Featherston railway station on the Wairarapa Line railway. The Wairarapa Connection train serves Featherston on its route between Masterton and Wellington, operating five times daily each way on weekdays and twice daily each way on weekends and public holidays. The journey time to Wellington station is just over 60 minutes.

== Climate ==
Climate data for Featherston (1981–2010)
Month	Jan	Feb	Mar	Apr	May	Jun	Jul	Aug	Sep	Oct	Nov	Dec	Year
Mean daily maximum °C (°F)	23.6 (74.5)	23.6 (74.5)	21.7 (71.1)	18.6 (65.5)	15.8 (60.4)	13.4 (56.1)	12.6 (54.7)	13.4 (56.1)	15.4 (59.7)	17.2 (63.0)	19.2 (66.6)	21.4 (70.5)	18.0 (64.4)
Daily mean °C (°F)	17.8 (64.0)	17.7 (63.9)	16.1 (61.0)	13.3 (55.9)	10.9 (51.6)	8.9 (48.0)	8.2 (46.8)	8.8 (47.8)	10.6 (51.1)	12.2 (54.0)	13.8 (56.8)	16.2 (61.2)	12.9 (55.2)
Mean daily minimum °C (°F)	12.0 (53.6)	11.9 (53.4)	10.5 (50.9)	7.9 (46.2)	6.0 (42.8)	4.4 (39.9)	3.8 (38.8)	4.2 (39.6)	5.7 (42.3)	7.3 (45.1)	8.5 (47.3)	11.0 (51.8)	7.8 (46.0)
Average rainfall mm (inches)	45.2 (1.78)	87.6 (3.45)	88.1 (3.47)	74.6 (2.94)	100.2 (3.94)	106.2 (4.18)	88.3 (3.48)	98.3 (3.87)	84.6 (3.33)	80.1 (3.15)	81.1 (3.19)	81.0 (3.19)	1,015.3 (39.97)
Mean monthly sunshine hours	233.5	182.9	177.8	150.1	120.6	91.7	115.1	117.5	134.8	182.5	190.8	208.5	1,905.8
Source: NIWA

== Sister cities ==
Featherston is twinned with the Belgian city of Mesen.

== Notable people ==
- Jonathan Winter (born 1971), 1996 Atlanta Olympics and 2012 London Olympics, 1994, 1998 and 2002 Commonwealth Games, 1995 World Champion Swimmer
- Bernard Beckett (born 1967), young adult fiction writer
- Henry Bunny (1822–1891), MP representing the Wairarapa electorate 1865–1881
- Rob Campbell (born 1951), socialist, economist, trade unionist, businessman and public servant
- Joy Cowley (born 1936), children's author
- Rawi Cundy (1901–1955), rugby union player
- Quentin Donald (1900–1965), rugby union player and local politician
- Charles Elgar (1855–1930), entrepreneur
- Ella Elgar (1869–1945), socialite and art collector
- Barry Oldridge (born 1950), wrestler
- Dan Riddiford (1914–1974), politician
- Graham Sims (born 1951), rugby union player and trade commissioner
- Adrienne Staples (born 1956/1957), local politician
