= List of schools in the Wellington Region =

The Wellington Region covers the southern tip of the North Island of New Zealand, including the Wellington metro area and the surrounding rural area, the Kāpiti Coast to the north, and the Wairarapa region to the northeast. It contains a few small rural primary schools, some small town primary and secondary schools, and a large number of city schools.

In New Zealand schools, students begin formal education in Year 1 at the age of five. Year 13 is the final year of secondary education. Years 14 and 15 refer to adult education facilities.

State schools are those fully funded by the government and at which no fees for tuition of domestic students (i.e. New Zealand citizens and permanent residents, and Australian citizens) can be charged, although a donation is commonly requested. A state-integrated school is a former private school with a special character based on a religious or philosophical belief that has been integrated into the state system. State integrated schools charge "attendance dues" to cover the building and maintenance of school buildings, which are not owned by the government, but otherwise they, like state schools, cannot charge fees for tuition of domestic students but may request a donation. Private schools charge fees to its students for tuition, as do state and state integrated schools for tuition of international students.

The roll of each school changes frequently as students start school for the first time, move between schools, and graduate. The rolls given here are those provided by the Ministry of Education, and are based on figures from July 2026. The Ministry of Education institution number links to the Education Counts page for each school.

== Kāpiti Coast District ==
| Name | Years | Gender | Area | Authority | Roll | Website | MOE | Notes |
|---|---|---|---|---|---|---|---|---|
| Kapakapanui School | 1–8 | Coed | Waikanae | State | 497 | | 2871 | |
| Kāpiti College | 9–13 | Coed | Raumati Beach | State | 1,389 | | 247 | Founded 1957 |
| Kapiti School | 1–8 | Coed | Paraparaumu | State | 101 | | 2873 | |
| Kenakena School | 1–8 | Coed | Paraparaumu Beach | State | 522 | | 2878 | |
| Ōtaki College | 7–13 | Coed | Ōtaki | State | 422 | | 240 | |
| Otaki School | 1–6 | Coed | Ōtaki | State | 204 | | 2939 | |
| Our Lady of Kapiti School | 1–8 | Coed | Paraparaumu | Integrated | 300 | | 3017 | Catholic |
| Paekākāriki School | 1–8 | Coed | Paekākāriki | State | 98 | | 2944 | |
| Paraparaumu Beach School | 1–8 | Coed | Paraparaumu Beach | State | 468 | | 2948 | |
| Paraparaumu College | 9–13 | Coed | Paraparaumu Beach | State | 1,488 | | 248 | Founded 1977 |
| Paraparaumu School | 1–8 | Coed | Paraparaumu | State | 305 | | 2949 | |
| Raumati Beach School | 1–8 | Coed | Raumati Beach | State | 516 | | 2974 | |
| Raumati South School | 1–8 | Coed | Raumati South | State | 357 | | 2975 | |
| St Peter Chanel School | 1–8 | Coed | Ōtaki | Integrated | 20 | | 3020 | |
| Te Horo School | 1–6 | Coed | Te Horo | State | 203 | | 3038 | |
| Te Kura Kaupapa Māori o Te Rito | 1–13 | Coed | Ōtaki | State | 98 | | 4211 | Kura Kaupapa Māori |
| Te Kura-a-iwi o Whakatupuranga Rua Mano | 1–13 | Coed | Ōtaki | State | 204 | | 3101 | |
| Te Ra School | 1–8 | Coed | Raumati South | Integrated | 141 | | 1613 | |
| Waikanae School | 1–8 | Coed | Waikanae | State | 457 | | 3056 | |
| Waitohu School | 1–6 | Coed | Waitohu | State | 233 | | 3065 | |

== Masterton District ==
| Name | Years | Gender | Area | Authority | Roll | Website | MOE | Notes |
|---|---|---|---|---|---|---|---|---|
| Chanel College | 7–13 | Coed | Kuripuni | Integrated | 342 | | 244 | Catholic, founded 1978 |
| Douglas Park School | 1–6 | Coed | Masterton West | State | 332 | | 1661 | |
| Fernridge School | 1–6 | Coed | Fernridge | State | 204 | | 2843 | Founded 1865 |
| Hadlow Preparatory School | 1–8 | Coed | Solway | Integrated | 195 | | 4104 | Anglican |
| Lakeview School | 1–8 | Coed | Lansdowne | State | 592 | | 1659 | |
| Makoura College | 9–13 | Coed | Masterton East | State | 358 | | 243 | Founded 1968 |
| Masterton Intermediate | 7–8 | Coed | Kuripuni | State | 335 | | 2909 | |
| Masterton Primary School | 1–6 | Coed | Kuripuni | State | 257 | | 1660 | |
| Mauriceville School | 1–8 | Coed | Mauriceville | State | 10 | – | 2911 | |
| Opaki School | 1–8 | Coed | Opaki | State | 175 | | 2936 | |
| Rathkeale College | 9–13 | Boys | Opaki | Integrated | 316 | | 245 | Anglican, Boarding |
| Solway College | 7–13 | Girls | Solway | Integrated | 207 | | 242 | Presbyterian, Boarding, Founded in 1916 |
| Solway School | 1–6 | Coed | Solway | State | 240 | | 2991 | |
| St Matthew's Collegiate | 7–13 | Girls | Masterton West | Integrated | 277 | | 246 | Anglican, Boarding, Founded 1914 |
| St Patrick's School | 1–6 | Coed | Masterton Central | Integrated | 217 | | 3016 | Catholic |
| TKKM o Wairarapa | 1–15 | Coed | Masterton East | State | 166 | – | 1651 | Kura Kaupapa Māori |
| Tīnui School | 1–8 | Coed | Tinui | State | 20 | | 3041 | |
| Wainuioru School | 1–8 | Coed | Wainuioru | State | 85 | | 3060 | |
| Wairarapa College | 9–13 | Coed | Masterton West | State | 949 | | 241 | Boarding, Founded 1938 |
| Wairarapa Teen Parent Unit | 9–13 | – | Masterton East | State | 0 | – | 2750 | Teen parent unit |
| Whareama School | 1–8 | Coed | Whareama | State | 50 | | 3070 | |

== Carterton District ==
| Name | Years | Gender | Area | Authority | Roll | Website | MOE | Notes |
|---|---|---|---|---|---|---|---|---|
| Carterton School | 1–8 | Coed | Carterton | State | 178 | | 2820 | |
| Dalefield School | 1–8 | Coed | Dalefield | State | 75 | | 2831 | |
| Gladstone School | 1–8 | Coed | Gladstone | State | 184 | | 2845 | |
| Ponatahi Christian School | 1–13 | Coed | Carterton | Integrated | 136 | | 528 | Reformed Congregation, Founded 1978 |
| South End School | 1–8 | Coed | Carterton | State | 191 | | 2992 | |
| St Mary's School | 1–8 | Coed | Carterton | Integrated | 134 | | 3013 | Catholic |

== South Wairarapa District ==
| Name | Years | Gender | Area | Authority | Roll | Website | MOE | Notes |
|---|---|---|---|---|---|---|---|---|
| Featherston School | 1–8 | Coed | Featherston | State | 143 | | 2840 | |
| Greytown School | 1–8 | Coed | Greytown | State | 309 | | 2850 | |
| Kahutara School | 1–8 | Coed | Kahutara | State | 90 | | 2868 | |
| Kuranui College | 9–13 | Coed | Greytown | State | 762 | | 249 | Founded in 1960 |
| Martinborough School | 1–8 | Coed | Martinborough | State | 245 | | 2906 | |
| Pirinoa School | 1–8 | Coed | Pirinoa | State | 36 | | 2958 | |
| South Featherston School | 1–8 | Coed | Featherston | State | 65 | | 2993 | |
| St Teresa's School | 1–8 | Coed | Featherston | Integrated | 117 | | 3023 | Catholic |

== Upper Hutt City ==
| Name | Years | Gender | Area | Authority | Roll | Website | MOE | Notes |
|---|---|---|---|---|---|---|---|---|
| Birchville School | 1–6 | Coed | Birchville | State | 131 | | 2810 | |
| Fergusson Intermediate | 7–8 | Coed | Trentham | State | 331 | | 2841 | |
| Fraser Crescent School | 1–6 | Coed | Elderslea | State | 291 | | 2844 | |
| Heretaunga College | 9–13 | Coed | Wallaceville | State | 865 | | 251 | Founded 1954 |
| Hutt International Boys' School | 7–13 | Boys | Trentham | Integrated | 653 | | 4158 | Founded 1991 |
| Maidstone Intermediate | 7–8 | Coed | Elderslea | State | 556 | | 2893 | |
| Mangaroa School | 1–6 | Coed | Mangaroa | State | 95 | | 2899 | |
| Maoribank School | 1–6 | Coed | Maoribank | State | 147 | | 2902 | |
| Oxford Crescent School | 1–6 | Coed | Ebdentown | State | 386 | | 2943 | |
| Pinehaven School | 1–6 | Coed | Pinehaven | State | 183 | | 2957 | |
| Plateau School | 1–6 | Coed | Te Mārua | State | 140 | | 2959 | |
| Silverstream Christian School | 1–13 | Coed | Silverstream | Private | 29 | | 622 | |
| Silverstream School | 1–6 | Coed | Silverstream | State | 481 | | 2990 | |
| St Brendan's School | 1–8 | Coed | Heretaunga | Integrated | 277 | | 3004 | Catholic |
| St Joseph's School | 1–8 | Coed | Upper Hutt Central | Integrated | 552 | | 3011 | Catholic, Founded 1911 |
| St. Patrick's College | 9–13 | Boys | Silverstream | Integrated | 750 | | 252 | Catholic, Founded 1931 |
| Titiro Whakamua | – | – | Wallaceville | State | 0 | | 2755 | Teen parent unit |
| Totara Park School | 1–6 | Coed | Tōtara Park | State | 222 | | 3048 | |
| Trentham School | 1–6 | Coed | Trentham | State | 364 | | 2099 | |
| Upper Hutt College | 9–13 | Coed | Trentham | State | 1,128 | | 250 | Founded 1962 |
| Upper Hutt School | 1–6 | Coed | Upper Hutt Central | State | 440 | | 3053 | |

== Lower Hutt City ==
| Name | Years | Gender | Area | Authority | Roll | Website | MOE | Notes |
|---|---|---|---|---|---|---|---|---|
| Arakura School | 1–6 | Coed | Wainuiomata | State | 148 | | 2802 | |
| Avalon Intermediate School | 7–8 | Coed | Avalon | State | 172 | | 3031 | |
| Avalon School | 1–6 | Coed | Avalon | State | 218 | | 2803 | |
| Belmont School | 1–6 | Coed | Belmont | State | 307 | | 2807 | |
| Boulcott School | 1–6 | Coed | Boulcott | State | 336 | | 2813 | |
| Chilton St James School | 1–13 | Girls | Hutt Central | Private | 260 | | 263 | Founded 1918 |
| Dyer Street School | 1–6 | Coed | Epuni | State | 206 | | 2833 | |
| Eastern Hutt School | 1–6 | Coed | Hutt Central | State | 591 | | 2834 | |
| Epuni School | 1–6 | Coed | Fairfield | State | 156 | | 2836 | |
| Fernlea School | 1–6 | Coed | Wainuiomata | State | 198 | | 2842 | |
| Gracefield School | 1–6 | Coed | Gracefield | State | 207 | | 2848 | |
| Hutt Central School | 1–6 | Coed | Alicetown | State | 270 | | 2862 | |
| Hutt Intermediate School | 7–8 | Coed | Woburn | State | 604 | | 2863 | |
| Hutt Valley High School | 9–13 | Coed | Hutt Central | State | 1,989 | | 261 | Founded 1926 |
| Kelson Primary School | 1–6 | Coed | Kelson | State | 265 | | 2877 | |
| Kimi Ora School | – | Coed | Naenae | State | 137 | | 514 | Special school for physical disabilities |
| Konini Primary School | 1–6 | Coed | Wainuiomata | State | 269 | | 1647 | |
| Koraunui School | 1–6 | Coed | Stokes Valley | State | 179 | | 2100 | |
| Korokoro School | 1–8 | Coed | Korokoro | State | 195 | | 2883 | |
| Maranatha Christian School | 1–8 | Coed | Belmont | Integrated | 156 | | 1179 | |
| Maungaraki School | 1–8 | Coed | Maungaraki | State | 358 | | 2968 | |
| Muritai School | 1–8 | Coed | Eastbourne | State | 332 | | 2920 | |
| Naenae College | 9–13 | Coed | Avalon | State | 871 | | 259 | Founded 1953 |
| Naenae Intermediate School | 7–8 | Coed | Avalon | State | 295 | | 2921 | |
| Naenae School | 1–6 | Coed | Naenae | State | 352 | | 2922 | |
| Normandale School | 1–6 | Coed | Normandale | State | 132 | | 2930 | |
| Our Lady of Rosary School | 1–8 | Coed | Waiwhetu | Integrated | 265 | | 2941 | Catholic |
| Petone Central School | 1–8 | Coed | Petone | State | 192 | | 2955 | |
| Pomare School | 1–6 | Coed | Taitā | State | 102 | | 2961 | |
| Pukeatua Primary School | 1–8 | Coed | Wainuiomata | State | 157 | | 2846 | |
| Randwick School | 1–8 | Coed | Moera | State | 112 | | 2969 | |
| Raphael House Rudolf Steiner School | 1–13 | Coed | Tirohanga | Integrated | 282 | | 133 | Waldorf education, Founded 1979 |
| Rata Street School | 1–6 | Coed | Naenae | State | 320 | | 2973 | |
| Sacred Heart College | 9–13 | Girls | Hutt Central | Integrated | 829 | | 262 | Catholic, Founded 1912 |
| Sacred Heart School | 1–8 | Coed | Petone | Integrated | 153 | | 2984 | Catholic |
| St Bernadette's School | 1–8 | Coed | Naenae | Integrated | 125 | | 3001 | Catholic |
| St Bernard's College | 7–13 | Boys | Hutt Central | Integrated | 677 | | 260 | Catholic, Founded 1946 |
| St Claudine Thevenet School | 1–8 | Coed | Wainuiomata | Integrated | 189 | | 3018 | Catholic |
| St Michael's School | 1–8 | Coed | Taitā | Integrated | 127 | | 3015 | Catholic |
| St Oran's College | 7–13 | Girls | Boulcott | Integrated | 503 | | 265 | Presbyterian, Founded 1958 |
| Sts Peter and Paul School | 1–8 | Coed | Hutt Central | Integrated | 442 | | 3021 | Catholic |
| Taita Central School | 1–6 | Coed | Taitā | State | 116 | | 3030 | |
| Taita College | 9–13 | Coed | Taitā | State | 348 | | 258 | Founded 1957 |
| Tawhai School | 1–6 | Coed | Stokes Valley | State | 331 | | 3036 | |
| TKKM o Te Ara Whanui | 1–8 | Coed | Alicetown | State | 411 | - | 1670 | Kura Kaupapa Māori |
| Tui Glen School | 1–8 | Coed | Stokes Valley | State | 178 | | 3051 | |
| Wainuiomata High School | 9–13 | Coed | Wainuiomata | State | 707 | | 478 | Founded 2002 |
| Wainuiomata Intermediate School | 7–8 | Coed | Wainuiomata | State | 341 | | 1646 | |
| Wainuiomata Primary School | 1–6 | Coed | Homedale | State | 246 | | 3059 | |
| Wa Ora Montessori School | 1–13 | Coed | Naenae | Integrated | 257 | | 1189 | Founded in 1988 |
| Waterloo School | 1–6 | Coed | Waterloo | State | 512 | | 3068 | |
| Wellesley College | 1–8 | Boys | Days Bay | Private | 232 | | 4149 | |
| Wilford School | 1–8 | Coed | Petone | State | 207 | | 3072 | |

== Porirua City ==
| Name | Years | Gender | Area | Authority | Roll | Website | MOE | Notes |
|---|---|---|---|---|---|---|---|---|
| Aotea College | 9–13 | Coed | Aotea | State | 1,365 | | 253 | Founded 1978 |
| Adventure School | 1–8 | Coed | Whitby | State | 462 | | 1195 | |
| Bishop Viard College | 7–13 | Coed | Kenepuru | Integrated | 398 | | 256 | Catholic, Founded 1968 |
| Brandon Intermediate | 7–8 | Coed | Cannons Creek | State | 167 | | 2814 | |
| Cannons Creek School | 1–6 | Coed | Cannons Creek | State | 131 | | 2818 | |
| Corinna School | 1–8 | Coed | Waitangirua | State | 137 | | 2828 | |
| Discovery School | 1–8 | Coed | Whitby | State | 457 | | 2832 | |
| Glenview School | 1–6 | Coed | Cannons Creek | State | 87 | | 2847 | |
| Holy Family School | 1–6 | Coed | Cannons Creek | Integrated | 154 | | 2859 | Catholic |
| Mahinawa Specialist School | - | Coed | Takapūwāhia | State | 154 | | 2872 | |
| Maraeroa School | 1–6 | Coed | Cannons Creek | State | 152 | | 2903 | |
| Mana College | 9–13 | Coed | Takapūwāhia | State | 511 | | 254 | Founded 1957 |
| Natone Park School | 1–6 | Coed | Waitangirua | State | 100 | | 2923 | |
| Ngati Toa School | 1–6 | Coed | Titahi Bay | State | 129 | | 2928 | |
| Papakowhai School | 1–8 | Coed | Papakōwhai | State | 469 | | 2946 | |
| Paremata School | 1–8 | Coed | Paremata | State | 311 | | 2950 | |
| Pauatahanui School | 1–8 | Coed | Pāuatahanui | State | 196 | | 2953 | |
| Plimmerton School | 1–8 | Coed | Plimmerton | State | 395 | | 2960 | |
| Porirua College | 9–13 | Coed | Cannons Creek | State | 578 | | 255 | Founded 1968 |
| Porirua East School | 1–6 | Coed | Rānui | State | 147 | | 2963 | |
| Porirua School | 1–6 | Coed | Elsdon | State | 136 | | 2964 | |
| Porirua Montessori Primary School | 1–8 | Coed | Whitby | Independent | 11 | | 3641 | |
| Postgate School | 1–8 | Coed | Whitby | State | 315 | | 2966 | |
| Pukerua Bay School | 1–8 | Coed | Pukerua Bay | State | 155 | | 2967 | |
| Rangikura School | 1–8 | Coed | Ascot Park | State | 360 | | 2970 | |
| Russell School | 1–6 | Coed | Cannons Creek | State | 112 | | 2983 | |
| St Pius X School | 1–6 | Coed | Titahi Bay | Integrated | 16 | | 3022 | |
| St Theresa's School | 1–6 | Coed | Plimmerton | Integrated | 199 | | 3025 | Catholic |
| Tairangi School | 1–8 | Coed | Waitangirua | State | 142 | | 3029 | |
| Te Kura Maori O Porirua | 1–13 | Coed | Waitangirua | State | 333 | | 1634 | |
| Titahi Bay Intermediate | 7–8 | Coed | Titahi Bay | State | 170 | | 3043 | |
| Titahi Bay North School | 1–8 | Coed | Titahi Bay | State | 123 | | 3044 | |
| Titahi Bay School | 1–6 | Coed | Titahi Bay | State | 368 | | 3045 | |
| Wellington Seventh-day Adventist School | 1–8 | Coed | Kenepuru | Integrated | 106 | | 4150 | Seventh-day Adventist |
| Whitby Collegiate | 7–13 | Coed | Whitby | Private | 357 | | 546 | Founded 2004 |
| Windley School | 1–8 | Coed | Cannons Creek | State | 183 | | 3074 | |

== Wellington City ==
| Name | Years | Gender | Locality | Authority | Roll | Website | MOE | Notes |
|---|---|---|---|---|---|---|---|---|
| Altum Classical Academy | 7-13 | Coed | Wilton | Charter School | 23 | | | Charter school |
| Amesbury School | 1–6 | Coed | Churton Park | State | 258 | | 614 | |
| Bellevue School | 1–6 | Coed | Newlands | State | 241 | | 2806 | |
| Berhampore School | 1–6 | Coed | Berhampore | State | 269 | | 2808 | |
| Brooklyn School | 1–8 | Coed | Brooklyn | State | 373 | | 2816 | |
| Central Regional Health School | – | Coed | Te Aro | State | 25 | | 1630 | Hospital school |
| Cashmere Avenue School | 1–6 | Coed | Khandallah | State | 310 | | 2821 | |
| Churton Park School | 1–6 | Coed | Churton Park | State | 312 | | 2824 | |
| Clifton Terrace Model School | 1–8 | Coed | Kelburn | State | 78 | | 2826 | |
| Clyde Quay School | 1–8 | Coed | Mount Victoria | State | 221 | | 2827 | |
| Crofton Downs Primary School | 1–6 | Coed | Crofton Downs | State | 158 | | 2823 | |
| Evans Bay Intermediate School | 7–8 | Coed | Kilbirnie | State | 336 | | 2837 | |
| Greenacres School | 1–6 | Coed | Tawa | State | 154 | | 2849 | Founded 1972 |
| Hampton Hill School | 1–6 | Coed | Tawa | State | 112 | | 2852 | Founded 1965 |
| Hataitai School | 1–8 | Coed | Hataitai | State | 217 | | 2854 | |
| He Huarahi Tamariki | – | – | Linden | State | 0 | | 2752 | Teen parent unit |
| Holy Cross School | 1–8 | Coed | Miramar | Integrated | 177 | | 2904 | |
| Houghton Valley School | 1–6 | Coed | Houghton Bay | State | 200 | | 2861 | |
| Island Bay School | 1–6 | Coed | Island Bay | State | 335 | | 2865 | |
| Johnsonville School | 1–6 | Coed | Johnsonville | State | 344 | | 2866 | |
| Kahurangi School | 1–8 | Coed | Strathmore Park | State | 263 | | 660 | |
| Karori Normal School | 1–8 | Coed | Karori | State | 594 | | 2874 | |
| Karori West Normal School | 1–8 | Coed | Karori | State | 437 | | 2875 | |
| Kelburn Normal School | 1–8 | Coed | Kelburn | State | 269 | | 2876 | |
| Khandallah School | 1–6 | Coed | Khandallah | State | 294 | | 2879 | |
| Kilbirnie School | 1–6 | Coed | Hataitai | State | 211 | | 2880 | |
| Linden School | 1–6 | Coed | Linden | State | 113 | | 2890 | |
| Lyall Bay School | 1–6 | Coed | Lyall Bay | State | 282 | | 2892 | |
| Makara Model School | 1–8 | Coed | Mākara | State | 63 | | 2894 | |
| Miramar Central School | 1–6 | Coed | Miramar | State | 170 | | 2915 | |
| Miramar Christian School | 1–8 | Coed | Miramar | Integrated | 168 | | 4119 | |
| Miramar North School | 1–6 | Coed | Miramar | State | 232 | | 2916 | |
| Mount Cook School | 1–8 | Coed | Mount Cook | State | 297 | | 2918 | |
| Newlands College | 9–13 | Coed | Newlands | State | 1,235 | | 268 | Founded 1970 |
| Newlands Intermediate | 7–8 | Coed | Newlands | State | 518 | | 2924 | |
| Newlands School | 1–6 | Coed | Newlands | State | 299 | | 2925 | |
| Newtown School | 1–6 | Coed | Newtown | State | 315 | | 2926 | |
| Ngaio School | 1–6 | Coed | Ngaio | State | 275 | | 2927 | |
| Northland School | 1–8 | Coed | Northland | State | 219 | | 2931 | |
| Otari School | 1–8 | Coed | Wilton | State | 198 | | 3073 | |
| Onslow College | 9–13 | Coed | Johnsonville | State | 1,187 | | 269 | Founded 1956 |
| Owhiro Bay School | 1–6 | Coed | Ōwhiro Bay | State | 84 | | 2942 | |
| Paparangi School | 1–6 | Coed | Paparangi | State | 232 | | 2947 | |
| Queen Margaret College | 1–13 | Girls | Thorndon | Private | 761 | | 278 | Presbyterian, Founded 1919 |
| Raroa Normal Intermediate | 7–8 | Coed | Johnsonville | State | 527 | | 2972 | |
| Redwood School | 1–6 | Coed | Redwood | State | 306 | | 2976 | Founded 1966 |
| Rewa Rewa School | 1–6 | Coed | Newlands | State | 141 | | 2979 | |
| Ridgway School | 1–8 | Coed | Mornington | State | 215 | | 2980 | |
| Rongotai College | 9–13 | Boys | Kilbirnie | State | 716 | | 277 | Founded 1928 |
| Roseneath School | 1–8 | Coed | Roseneath | State | 71 | | 2982 | |
| Sacred Heart Cathedral School | 1–8 | Coed | Thorndon | Integrated | 232 | | 2985 | Catholic |
| Samuel Marsden Collegiate School Karori | 1–13 | Girls | Karori | Private | 391 | | 280 | Anglican, Founded in 1878 |
| Scots College | 1–13 | Coed | Strathmore Park | Private | 1,169 | | 281 | Presbyterian, Boarding, Founded 1916 |
| Seatoun School | 1–8 | Coed | Seatoun | State | 383 | | 2987 | |
| South Wellington Intermediate | 7–8 | Coed | Newtown | State | 337 | | 2994 | |
| St Anne's School | 1–8 | Coed | Newtown | Integrated | 220 | | 2997 | Catholic |
| St Anthony's School | 1–8 | Coed | Seatoun | Integrated | 35 | | 2999 | Catholic |
| St Benedict's School | 1–8 | Coed | Khandallah | Integrated | 209 | | 3000 | Catholic |
| St Brigid's School | 1–8 | Coed | Johnsonville | Integrated | 290 | | 3005 | Catholic |
| St Catherine's College | 9–13 | Girls | Kilbirnie | Integrated | 209 | | 284 | Catholic, Founded 1950 |
| St Francis De Sales School | 1–8 | Coed | Island Bay | Integrated | 196 | | 3006 | Catholic |
| St Francis Xavier School | 1–6 | Coed | Redwood | Integrated | 157 | | 3007 | Catholic, Founded 1960 |
| St Mark's Church School | 1–8 | Coed | Mount Victoria | Private | 133 | | 4134 | Anglican |
| St Mary's College | 9–13 | Girls | Thorndon | Integrated | 558 | | 286 | Catholic, Founded 1850 |
| St Patrick's College (Kilbirnie) | 9–13 | Boys | Kilbirnie | Integrated | 717 | | 276 | Catholic, Founded in 1885 |
| St Patrick's School | 1–6 | Coed | Kilbirnie | Integrated | 125 | | 3019 | Catholic |
| St Teresa's School | 1–8 | Coed | Karori | Integrated | 125 | | 3024 | Catholic |
| Tawa College | 9–13 | Coed | Tawa | State | 1,039 | | 257 | Founded 1961 |
| Tawa Intermediate | 7–8 | Coed | Tawa | State | 453 | | 3034 | Founded 1975 |
| Tawa School | 1–8 | Coed | Tawa | State | 413 | | 3035 | Founded 1860 |
| Te Aro School | 1–8 | Coed | Te Aro | State | 210 | | 3037 | |
| Te Kura Kaupapa Māori o Nga Mokopuna | 1–13 | Coed | Seatoun | State | 176 | | 1143 | Kura Kaupapa Māori |
| Thorndon School | 1–8 | Coed | Thorndon | State | 278 | | 3040 | |
| Wadestown School | 1–8 | Coed | Wadestown | State | 249 | | 3055 | |
| West Park School | 1–6 | Coed | Johnsonville | State | 246 | | 2867 | |
| Wellington College | 9–13 | Boys | Mount Victoria | State | 1,929 | | 275 | Founded in 1867 |
| Wellington East Girls' College | 9–13 | Girls | Mount Victoria | State | 1,006 | | 274 | Founded 1925 |
| Wellington Girls' College | 9–13 | Girls | Thorndon | State | 1,425 | | 272 | Founded in 1883 |
| Wellington High School | 9–13 | Coed | Mount Cook | State | 1,642 | | 273 | Founded 1964 |
| Worser Bay School | 1–6 | Coed | Worser Bay | State | 110 | | 3077 | |

== Closed schools ==
Wellington City

- Athena Montessori College, Wellington. Closed in February 2009.
- Cardinal McKeefry School closed late 2025. Campus taken over by Altum Classical Academy
- Kaiwharawhara Primary School, 1925–1977.
- Kingston School, Wellington
- Miramar South School and Strathmore Community School, merged on the Strathmore site in January 2013 to form Kahurangi School.
- Moriah College, state-integrated school.
- St Bernard's School, Brooklyn, closed late 2025.

Lower Hutt City

- Children of Hope New Zealand, Wainuiomata. Closed at the end of 2007.
- Glendale School, Wainuiomata, merged with Pencarrow School an Glendale site to form Pukeatua School.
- Hutt Valley Christian School, Wainuiomata. Closed December 2012.
- Kamahi School, merged with Stokes Valley School to form Koraunui School in January 2005.
- Manor Park School, Manor Park, Lower Hutt
- Otonga School, closed April 1999.
- Parkway College, Wainuiomata. Merged with Wainuiomata College to form Wainuiomata High School in January 2002.
- Parkway Intermediate School, Wainuiomata. Merged with Wainuiomata on Parkway site to form the new Wainuiomata Intermediate School in January 2002.
- Parkway School, Wainuiomata, merged with Sun valley School on Parkway site to form Konini School in January 2002.
- Pencarrow School, Wainuiomata, merged with Glendale School on Glendale site to form Pukeatua School in January 2002.
- Petone College, Ava. Closed January 1999.
- Petone West School, closed 1979. As of March 2013, a Countdown supermarket is under construction on its former site.
- San Antonio School, Eastbourne, closed 2022.
- St Matthew's School and St Patrick's School, Wainuiomata, merged with one another on St Patrick's site to form St Claudine Thevenet School in January 2003.
- Stokes Valley School, merged with Kamahi School on Kamahi site to form Koraunui School in January 2005.
- Sun Valley School, Wainuiomata, merged with Parkway School on Parkway site to form Konini School in January 2002.
- Wainuiomata College, Wainuiomata. Merged with Parkway College at Parkway site to form Wainuiomata High School in January 2002.
- Wainuiomata Intermediate School (old), merged with Parkway Intermediate School on Parkway site to form the new Wainuiomata Intermediate School in January 2002.
- Waiwhetu School, closed December 2001.
- Wood Hatton School, merged with Wainuiomata Primary School on Wainuiomata Primary site in January 2002.

Upper Hutt City

- Brentwood School, Upper Hutt, merged with Trentham School on Trentham site in January 2005.
- Brown Owl School, Brown Owl, Upper Hutt, closed April 2003 - which was previously known as Te Marua School until name changed in 1973.
- Upper Valley Middle School, a private year 7-10 composite school - closed voluntarily in February 2015.

Kāpiti Coast District

- Kapiti Christian School, private full primary school, closed December 2009
- Otaki Health Camp School
- Reikorangi College, private composite school, closed December 2009
- Thomas Kennedy Junior Academy, Paraparaumu. Closed August 2007.
- Presentation College, Paraparaumu - Catholic, closed 1973

Masterton District

- Mauriceville West School, closed 15 December 1972
- Bideford School, closed September 2003.
- Castlepoint School, closed December 1999.
- Homeleigh Christian School, Masterton, closed 2007.
- Masterton East School, closed April 2002; site now used by TKKM o Wairarapa.
- Okautete School, closed April 2001.
- Te Wharau School, closed May 1999.
- In 2003, an extensive review of Masterton district primary schools meant many schools closed and combined to form new schools ready for the beginning of the 2004 school year.
  - Mikimiki School closed and merged with Opaki School.
  - Masterton Central School and Harley Street School combined on the Masterton Central site to form Masterton Primary School.
  - Masterton West School and Cornwall Street School combined on the Masterton West site to form Douglas Park School.
  - Totara Drive School, Lansdowne School and Hiona Intermediate School combined on the Hiona Intermediate site to form Lakeview School.
