= Thomas Coldham Williams =

New Zealand land owner

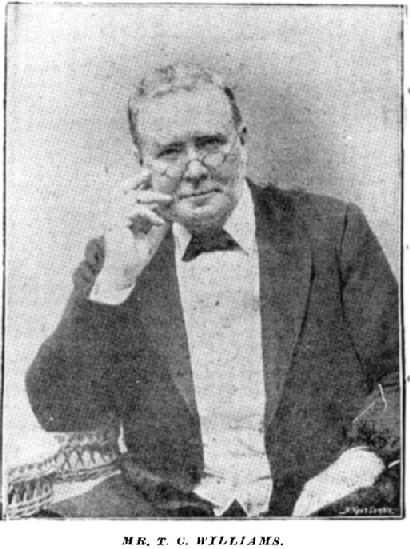
Williams c. 1897

Thomas Coldham Williams (1825–1912) was a New Zealand land owner. A son of Henry Williams, Williams received a good education and had access to capital, which led to him acquiring a lot of land, especially in the Wairarapa. Williams managed the Brancepeth Station and was critical of the government's acquisition of land in the Manawatu area.

== Biography ==
=== Early life ===
Williams was born in Paihia, New Zealand, in 1825. As the son of Henry Williams, Williams was educated at Te Waimate Mission.

Williams later studied at St John's College and received education from his uncle William Williams. Williams farmed in the Bay of Islands before moving to Auckland and in 1864, being elected to represent the Bay of Islands on the Auckland Provincial Council, but did not take the seat and moved to the Wellington Province.

=== Personal life ===
In 1858, Williams married Anne Beetham, Williams and his wife had 13 children.

=== Brancepeth ===
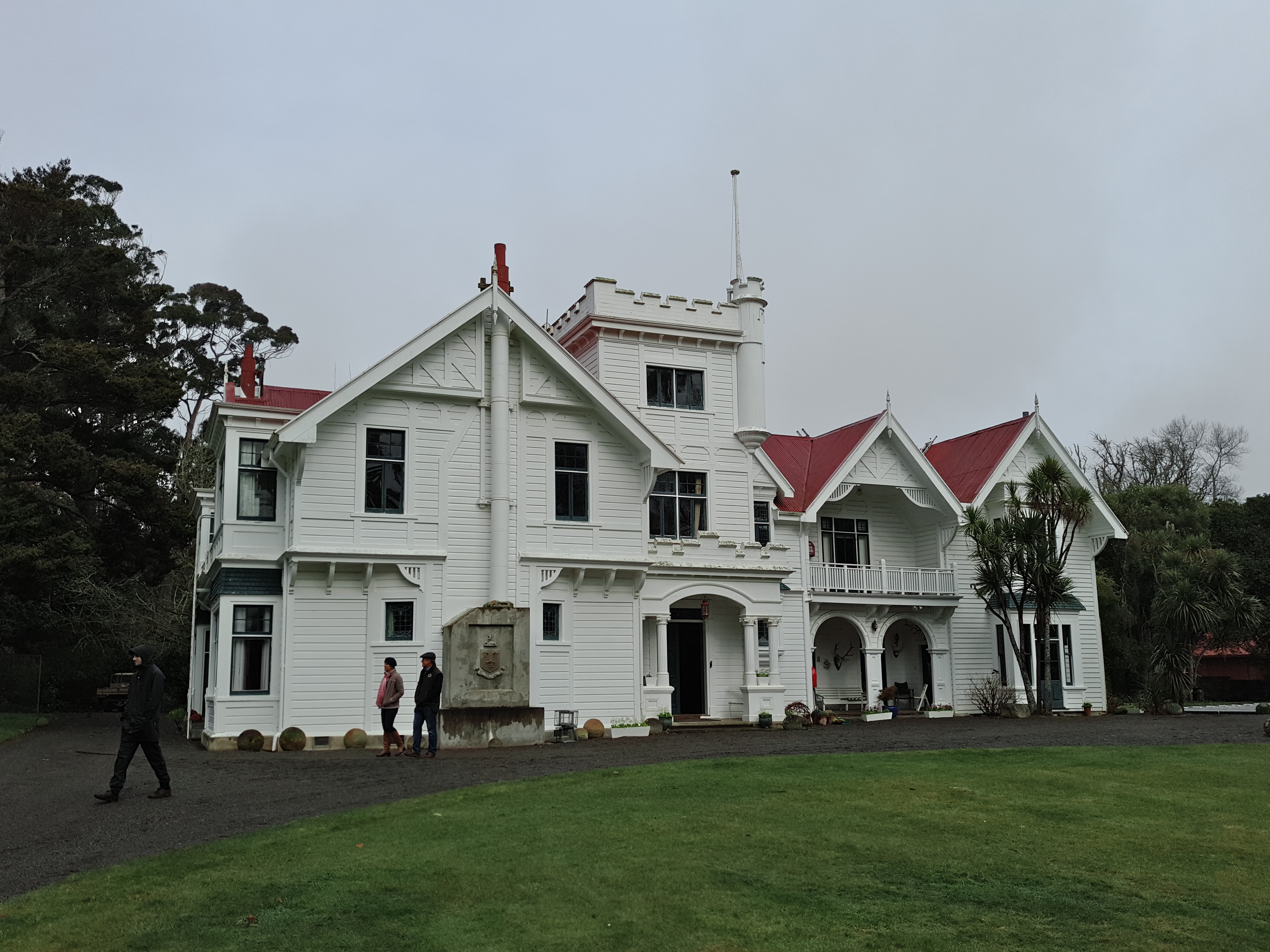
The Brancepeth Station house

Williams marriage to Anne Beetham, daughter of William Beetham, put Williams in charge of Brancepeth, a 4,000 hectares (9,900 acres) station in Wainuioru. Williams used his capital to double the size by purchasing land from local Mãori. The Brancepeth Station eventually grew to 49,000 acres (20,000 ha).

In addition to Brancepeth, Williams had 2,000 acres (810 ha) at Lansdowne and had town sections in Pahiatua, Eketāhuna, and Masterton, as well as owning most of the land around Kerikeri by the 1890s.

=== Manawatu purchase ===
In the 1850s, the government started purchasing land around the Manawatu area. Williams believed the purchase was in violation of the Treaty of Waitangi and wrote to newspapers about the purchase as well as writing a pamphlet in 1868 titled: The Manawatu Purchase Completed, or, The Treaty of Waitangi Broken. Williams signed his pamphlet as a 'Native of New Zealand', which at the time was a term typically reserved for Mãori. Williams, who was not a lawyer, also served as legal counsel for Ngāti Raukawa in their case in the Native Land Court about the purchase. The court sided with the government and the purchase was ruled valid.

=== Queen Margaret College Tower ===
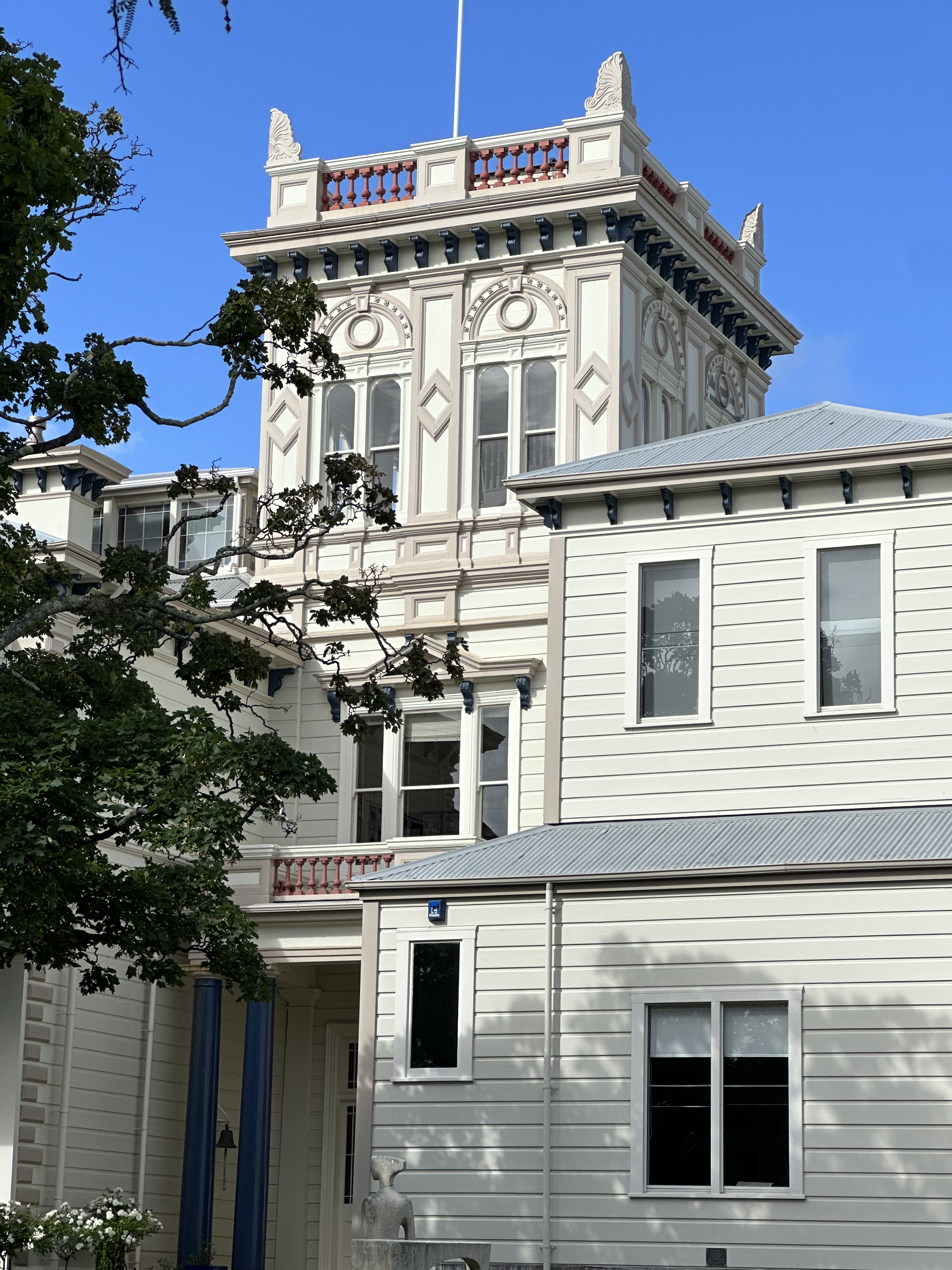
Williams' Hobson street residence

By 1878, Williams was living in Wellington. In March 1878, Williams had purchased a Hobson Street property belonging to the deceased architect William Clayton. This property was one of the first concrete residences in New Zealand and Williams hired Charles Tringham to extend the property. The property was known for the events that were held there during the 19th and 20th century. Following Williams' death the property became part of Queen Margaret College.

=== Manako Station ===
In Kerikeri, Williams had a station of 6,640 acres (2,690 ha) named Manako Station that grew a wide variety of crops, in addition to cattle, sheep, and horses. The station grew paspalum, Swedes, turnips, oats, and heathgrass. The station also experimented with gorse, which later became a weed in the area as the temperate climate allowed it to spread quickly. Williams' sons, Guy and Hugh, helped to run the station and it was one of the largest employers in Kerikeri.
