= Kuripuni =

Suburb of Masterton, New Zealand

- Suburb
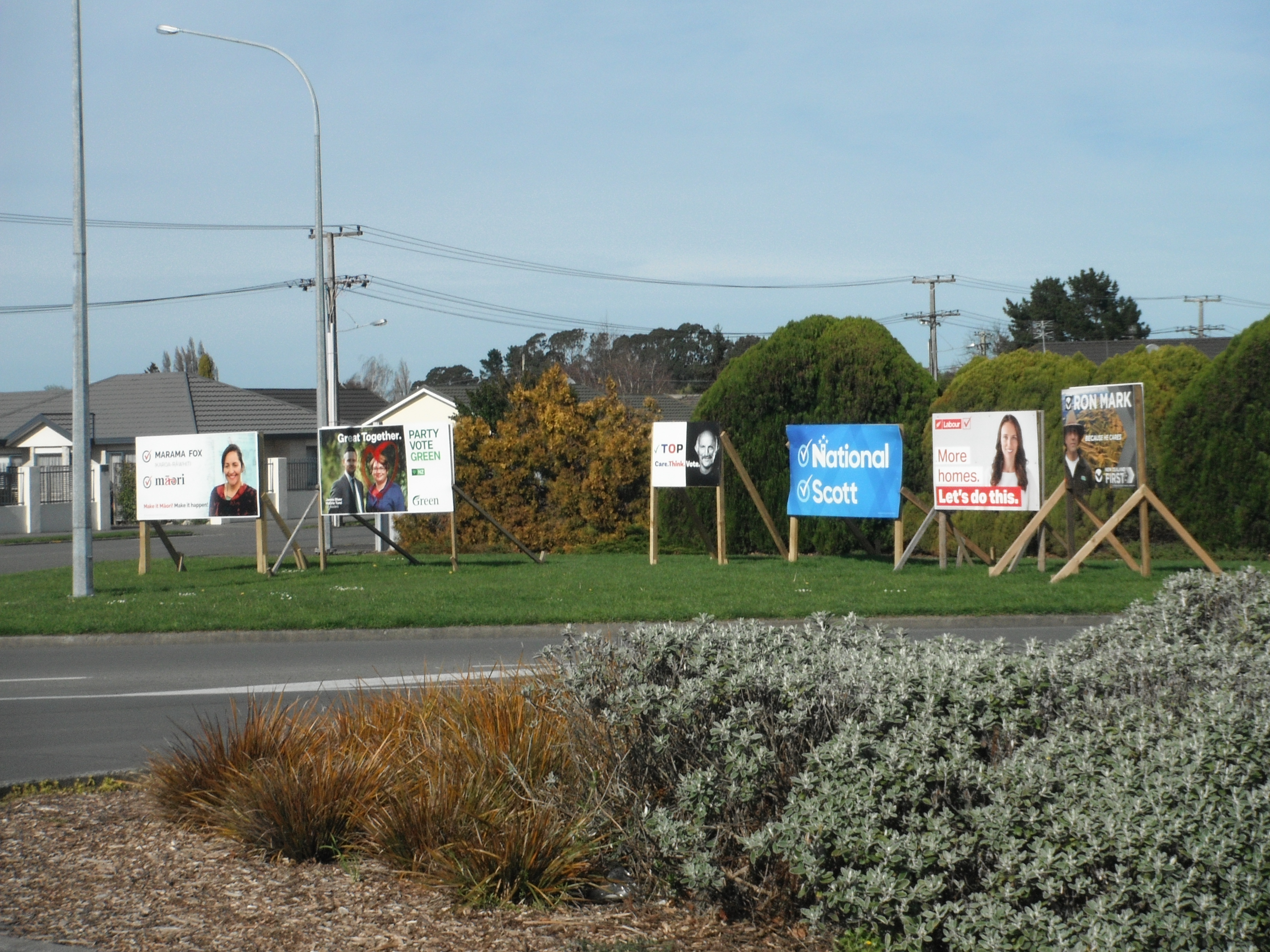
- Election hoardings at Kuripuni in 2017
- Interactive map of Kuripuni
- Coordinates: 40.959652°S 175.646576°E
- Country: New Zealand
- City: Masterton
- Local authority: Masterton District Council

Area
  - Land: 126 ha (310 acres)

Population (June 2025)
  - Total: 1,670
  - Density: 1,330/km^{2} (3,430/sq mi)
- Railway stations: Renall Street railway station

Ngaumutawa	Masterton West	Masterton Central
	Kuripuni	Masterton East
	Solway

Kuripuni is a suburb of Masterton, a town on New Zealand's North Island.

It has a sports bar, a medical centre, and a post shop.

The Kuripuni Village was redeveloped during the 2010s. The Kuripuni Bookshop, which operated between 1996 and 2018, was the last of the original stores to close.

== Demographics ==
Kuripuni statistical area covers 1.26 km^{2} (0.49 sq mi). It had an estimated population of 1,670 as of June 2025, with a population density of 1,325 people per km^{2}.

Historical population
Year	Pop.	±% p.a.
2006	1,581	—
2013	1,638	+0.51%
2018	1,653	+0.18%
2023	1,653	+0.00%

Kuripuni had a population of 1,653 in the 2023 New Zealand census, unchanged since the 2018 census, and an increase of 15 people (0.9%) since the 2013 census. There were 786 males, 864 females, and 3 people of other genders in 684 dwellings. 2.5% of people identified as LGBTIQ+. The median age was 48.6 years (compared with 38.1 years nationally). There were 234 people (14.2%) aged under 15 years, 279 (16.9%) aged 15 to 29, 675 (40.8%) aged 30 to 64, and 465 (28.1%) aged 65 or older.

People could identify as more than one ethnicity. The results were 87.3% European (Pākehā); 19.6% Māori; 3.1% Pasifika; 5.4% Asian; 1.1% Middle Eastern, Latin American and African New Zealanders (MELAA); and 1.8% other, which includes people giving their ethnicity as "New Zealander". English was spoken by 97.8%, Māori by 3.3%, Samoan by 0.5%, and other languages by 8.0%. No language could be spoken by 1.3% (e.g. too young to talk). The percentage of people born overseas was 17.8, compared with 28.8% nationally.

Religious affiliations were 35.2% Christian, 0.7% Hindu, 0.5% Islam, 0.5% Māori religious beliefs, 0.4% Buddhist, 0.4% New Age, 0.2% Jewish, and 0.7% other religions. People who answered that they had no religion were 52.1%, and 9.1% of people did not answer the census question.

Of those at least 15 years old, 285 (20.1%) people had a bachelor's or higher degree, 789 (55.6%) had a post-high school certificate or diploma, and 354 (24.9%) people exclusively held high school qualifications. The median income was $34,900, compared with $41,500 nationally. 108 people (7.6%) earned over $100,000 compared to 12.1% nationally. The employment status of those at least 15 was 624 (44.0%) full-time, 210 (14.8%) part-time, and 30 (2.1%) unemployed.

== Education ==
=== Masterton's first school ===
Masterton Primary School is a co-educational state primary school for Year 1 to 6 students, with a roll of 257 as of July 2026.

The only school within the Masterton borough until 1909 when Lansdowne School opened (that school closed in 2004) it was founded in 1865 as Masterton West School. The attendance fees were a shilling a week in spite of a state subsidy. In 1866 they had 11 boys and 9 girls in one room on the Upper Plain opposite the current Fernridge School. Masterton's first State School was founded in 1877 using premises in Dixon Street near the site of the current courthouse and the close by park for playgrounds. The roll was 389 pupils in 1881. These arrangements were soon replaced by Masterton Central School in Kuripuni which opened on 6 February 1882. The site was sandwiched between Queen and Chapel Streets taking more than 5 acres, the northern half of the block bounded by Kuripuni Street and Russell Street where it met the education reserve that would also become for a while the grounds of Wairarapa College and St Joseph's, St Patrick's and the Convent.

It became Masterton District High School in 1884 after adding classes in mathematics, Latin and French but there were insufficient secondary pupils and after 15 months it reverted to being Central. The High School status returned for 21 years in March 1902. In March 1923 the new Wairarapa High School opened taking away the secondary department. The primary department resumed the name Masterton Central School until 2004 (when Harley Street School was closed and merged in) and the word Central was replaced with Primary.

In the 1960s it was recognised the buildings needed to be renewed but, positioned across the entrance to town, the school's generous site had become commercially valuable. The school's move to 53 South Road was completed at the end of 1970 and Kuripuni's triangle began to take on a quite different style and appearance. Most of the school's 1960s South Road buildings were replaced in 2004.

Masterton Intermediate School is a co-educational state intermediate school for Year 7 to 8 students, with a roll of 335. It opened in 1960.
