= Ngaumutawa =

Suburb of Masterton, New Zealand

- Suburb
- Interactive map of Ngaumutawa
- Coordinates: 40.942°S 175.638°E
- Country: New Zealand
- City: Masterton
- Local authority: Masterton District Council

Area
  - Land: 116 ha (290 acres)

Population (June 2025)
  - Total: 1,730
  - Density: 1,490/km^{2} (3,860/sq mi)

Fernridge	Mikimiki	Ōpaki
	Ngaumutawa	Masterton Central
Solway	Kuripuni	Masterton West

Ngaumutawa is a suburb of Masterton, New Zealand.

Ngaumutawa is a Māori language word meaning an oven of the tawa tree. Ngaumutawa was a Māori village or pā in 1853. The Native Land Court assigned title to the land in 1866, and most was sold to pākehā settlers by the end of the decade. Ngaumutawa Road was created about 1904. The area was still rural in 1973 but was under development in 1980.

The rural area southeast of Ngaumutawa is marked as a "Future Development Area" by the Masterton District Council. The plan was criticised for not explicitly including provision for affordable housing.

== Demographics ==
Ngaumutawa statistical area covers 1.16 km^{2} (0.45 sq mi). It had an estimated population of 1,730 as of June 2025, with a population density of 1,491 people per km^{2}.

Historical population
Year	Pop.	±% p.a.
2006	1,380	—
2013	1,392	+0.12%
2018	1,512	+1.67%
2023	1,671	+2.02%
The 2006 population is for a smaller area of 0.85 km^{2}. Source:

Ngaumutawa had a population of 1,671 in the 2023 New Zealand census, an increase of 159 people (10.5%) since the 2018 census, and an increase of 279 people (20.0%) since the 2013 census. There were 759 males, 900 females, and 12 people of other genders in 729 dwellings. 3.1% of people identified as LGBTIQ+. The median age was 48.7 years (compared with 38.1 years nationally). There were 279 people (16.7%) aged under 15 years, 249 (14.9%) aged 15 to 29, 624 (37.3%) aged 30 to 64, and 525 (31.4%) aged 65 or older.

People could identify as more than one ethnicity. The results were 86.2% European (Pākehā); 21.5% Māori; 3.6% Pasifika; 3.8% Asian; 0.9% Middle Eastern, Latin American and African New Zealanders (MELAA); and 2.3% other, which includes people giving their ethnicity as "New Zealander". English was spoken by 98.2%, Māori by 4.3%, Samoan by 0.5%, and other languages by 6.1%. No language could be spoken by 1.4% (e.g. too young to talk). New Zealand Sign Language was known by 0.5%. The percentage of people born overseas was 13.5, compared with 28.8% nationally.

Religious affiliations were 34.6% Christian, 1.1% Hindu, 0.5% Māori religious beliefs, 0.2% Buddhist, 0.5% New Age, and 1.1% other religions. People who answered that they had no religion were 54.4%, and 7.7% of people did not answer the census question.

Of those at least 15 years old, 216 (15.5%) people had a bachelor's or higher degree, 777 (55.8%) had a post-high school certificate or diploma, and 396 (28.4%) people exclusively held high school qualifications. The median income was $35,300, compared with $41,500 nationally. 84 people (6.0%) earned over $100,000 compared to 12.1% nationally. The employment status of those at least 15 was 606 (43.5%) full-time, 180 (12.9%) part-time, and 18 (1.3%) unemployed.
