= Masterton West =

Suburb of Masterton, New Zealand

- Suburb
- Interactive map of Masterton West
- Coordinates: 40.949244°S 175.647335°E
- Country: New Zealand
- City: Masterton
- Local authority: Masterton District Council

Area
  - Land: 121 ha (300 acres)

Population (June 2025)
  - Total: 2,090
  - Density: 1,730/km^{2} (4,470/sq mi)
- Railway stations: Renall Street railway station

		Lansdowne
Ngaumutawa	Masterton West	Masterton Central
	Kuripuni	Masterton East

Masterton West is a suburb of Masterton, a town on New Zealand's North Island.

It includes Renall Street railway station and the Douglas Parks sports group.

Air quality in Masterton West exceeded World Health Organization guidelines for 28 days in 2018 and 34 days in 2019.

== Demographics ==
Douglas Park statistical area, which corresponds to Masterton West, covers 1.21 km^{2} (0.47 sq mi). It had an estimated population of 2,090 as of June 2025, with a population density of 1,727 people per km^{2}.

Historical population
Year	Pop.	±% p.a.
2006	1,887	—
2013	1,905	+0.14%
2018	2,016	+1.14%
2023	2,061	+0.44%

Douglas Park had a population of 2,061 in the 2023 New Zealand census, an increase of 45 people (2.2%) since the 2018 census, and an increase of 156 people (8.2%) since the 2013 census. There were 963 males, 1,092 females, and 6 people of other genders in 819 dwellings. 2.9% of people identified as LGBTIQ+. The median age was 42.8 years (compared with 38.1 years nationally). There were 399 people (19.4%) aged under 15 years, 351 (17.0%) aged 15 to 29, 810 (39.3%) aged 30 to 64, and 504 (24.5%) aged 65 or older.

People could identify as more than one ethnicity. The results were 84.9% European (Pākehā); 20.7% Māori; 4.9% Pasifika; 3.6% Asian; 0.6% Middle Eastern, Latin American and African New Zealanders (MELAA); and 1.5% other, which includes people giving their ethnicity as "New Zealander". English was spoken by 97.1%, Māori by 3.6%, Samoan by 1.9%, and other languages by 6.0%. No language could be spoken by 2.3% (e.g. too young to talk). New Zealand Sign Language was known by 0.4%. The percentage of people born overseas was 16.2, compared with 28.8% nationally.

Religious affiliations were 30.7% Christian, 0.6% Hindu, 0.6% Islam, 0.6% Māori religious beliefs, 0.3% Buddhist, 0.7% New Age, 0.4% Jewish, and 1.2% other religions. People who answered that they had no religion were 56.6%, and 8.4% of people did not answer the census question.

Of those at least 15 years old, 315 (19.0%) people had a bachelor's or higher degree, 909 (54.7%) had a post-high school certificate or diploma, and 447 (26.9%) people exclusively held high school qualifications. The median income was $33,500, compared with $41,500 nationally. 129 people (7.8%) earned over $100,000 compared to 12.1% nationally. The employment status of those at least 15 was 726 (43.7%) full-time, 243 (14.6%) part-time, and 39 (2.3%) unemployed.

== Education ==
Douglas Park School is a co-educational state primary school for Year 1 to 6 students, with a roll of 356 as of October 2025. It was created in 2004 by the merger of Cornwall Street School (opened 1950) and Masterton West School (opened 1921).

Wairarapa College is a co-educational state secondary school for Year 9 to 13 students, with a roll of 963. It opened in 1938 with a merger of Wairarapa High School (opened 1923) and Seddon Memorial Technical School (opened 1908).

St Matthew's Collegiate is a state-integrated Anglican girls' secondary school for Year 7 to 13 students, with a roll of 291. It opened in 1914.

Masterton West also has a kindergarten.
