= Lansdowne, Masterton =

Suburb of Masterton, New Zealand

Lansdowne
- Suburb
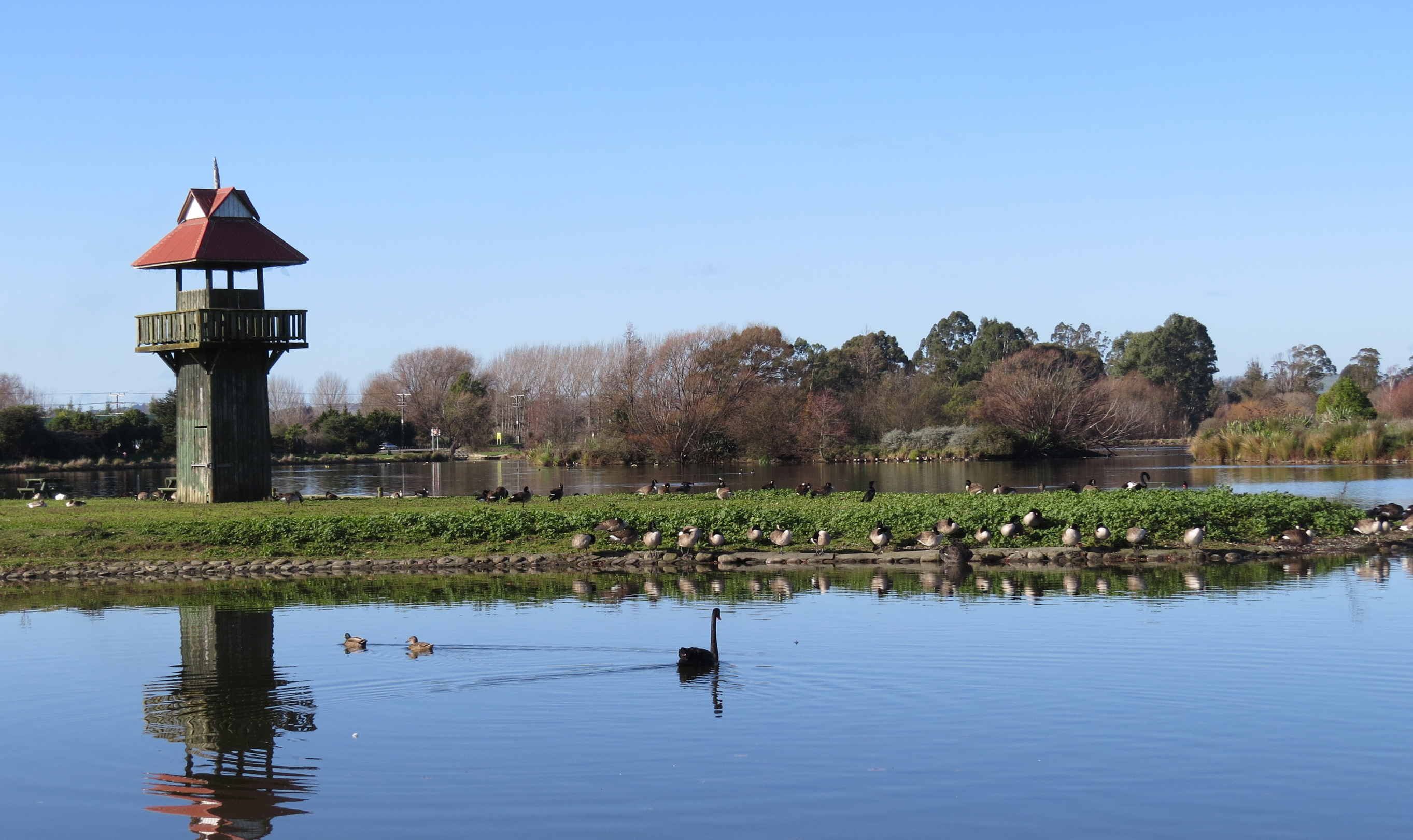
- Henley Lake beside the Ruamahunga River
- Interactive map of Lansdowne
- Coordinates: 40.938501°S 175.676481°E
- Country: New Zealand
- City: Masterton
- Local authority: Masterton District Council

Area
  - Land: 621 ha (1,530 acres)

Population (June 2025)
  - Total: 5,010
  - Density: 807/km^{2} (2,090/sq mi)
- Hospitals: Wairarapa Hospital

	Ōpaki
Ngaumutawa	Lansdowne	Tauweru
Masterton Central	Masterton East	Wainuioru

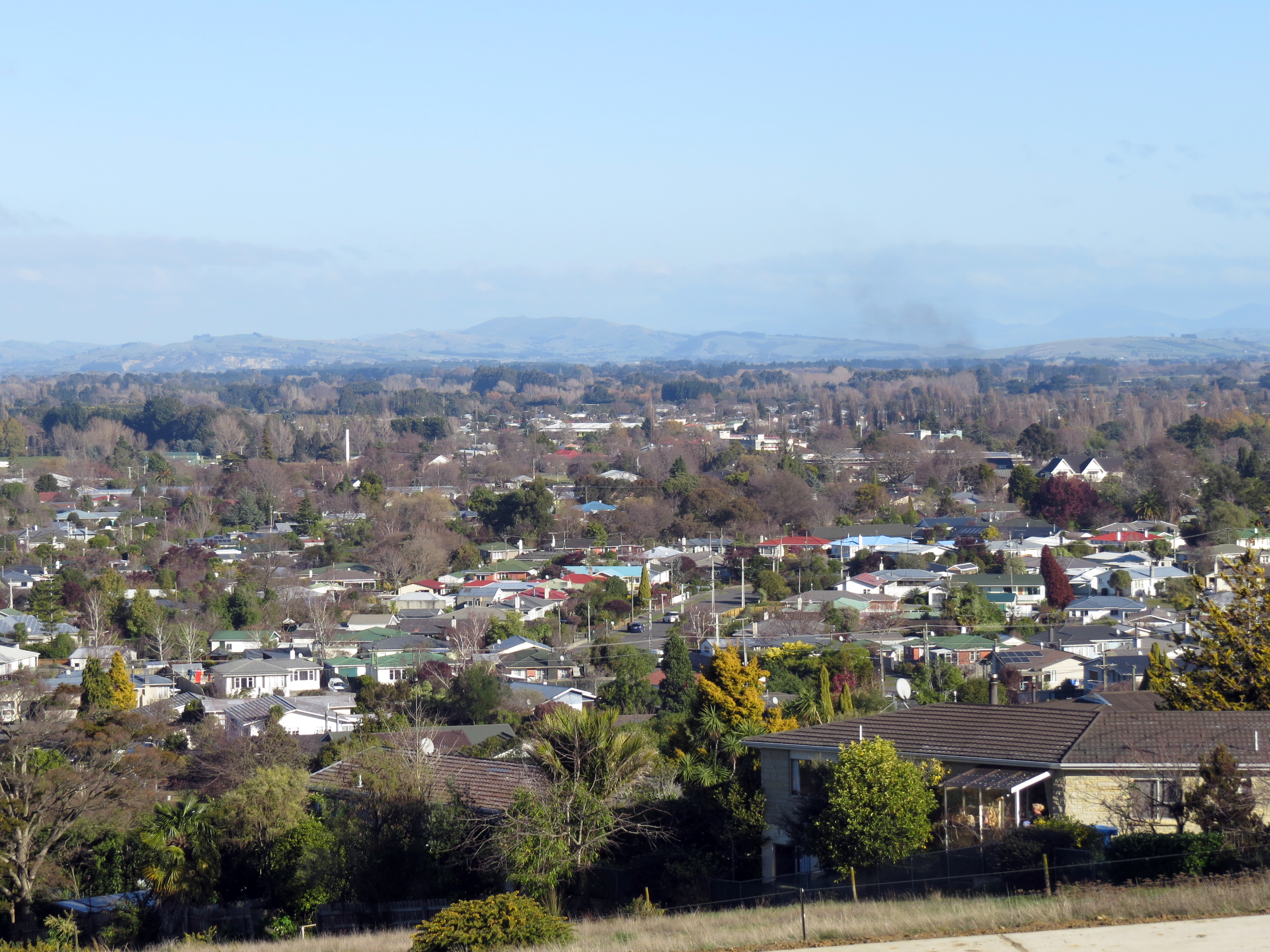
Lansdowne looking south from Boltons Road

Lansdowne, one of Masterton's largest suburbs, is on the left bank of the Waipoua stream at the north-western end of Masterton, New Zealand. On the town's highest ground it provides broad vistas of much of the Wairarapa Valley. It is further distinguished from the rest of the town by having been subdivided late in the 19th century and because it was administered by the Masterton County Council. It was amalgamated with Masterton Borough in 1921.

Lansdowne was named by an early settler, J. Valentine Smith, who named his station after his father-in-law's station in New South Wales. His 2,085 acre estate was bought in 1884 by Thomas Coldham Williams.

Parts of Lansdowne, Lansdowne Hill and Lansdowne Terrace, are more affluent than most other Masterton suburbs. The property prices are helped by the suburb's views of the Tararua Ranges, the presence of a retirement village and two golf courses, on the top of the hill and at Mahunga by the Waipoua stream.

== Demographics ==
Lansdowne, comprising the statistical areas of Lansdowne West and Lansdowne East, covers 6.21 km^{2} (2.40 sq mi). It had an estimated population of 5,010 as of June 2025, with a population density of 807 people per km^{2}.

Historical population
Year	Pop.	±% p.a.
2006	3,867	—
2013	3,978	+0.41%
2018	4,383	+1.96%
2023	4,800	+1.83%
The 2006 population is for a smaller area of 5.60 km^{2}. Source:

Lansdowne had a population of 4,800 in the 2023 New Zealand census, an increase of 417 people (9.5%) since the 2018 census, and an increase of 822 people (20.7%) since the 2013 census. There were 2,301 males, 2,484 females, and 15 people of other genders in 1,953 dwellings. 2.6% of people identified as LGBTIQ+. The median age was 44.4 years (compared with 38.1 years nationally). There were 813 people (16.9%) aged under 15 years, 792 (16.5%) aged 15 to 29, 1,878 (39.1%) aged 30 to 64, and 1,317 (27.4%) aged 65 or older.

People could identify as more than one ethnicity. The results were 83.7% European (Pākehā); 21.6% Māori; 4.2% Pasifika; 6.0% Asian; 0.3% Middle Eastern, Latin American and African New Zealanders (MELAA); and 2.1% other, which includes people giving their ethnicity as "New Zealander". English was spoken by 97.1%, Māori by 5.0%, Samoan by 1.0%, and other languages by 6.4%. No language could be spoken by 2.4% (e.g. too young to talk). New Zealand Sign Language was known by 0.5%. The percentage of people born overseas was 15.3, compared with 28.8% nationally.

Religious affiliations were 37.2% Christian, 1.0% Hindu, 0.4% Islam, 1.1% Māori religious beliefs, 0.4% Buddhist, 0.4% New Age, 0.1% Jewish, and 1.3% other religions. People who answered that they had no religion were 51.2%, and 7.1% of people did not answer the census question.

Of those at least 15 years old, 708 (17.8%) people had a bachelor's or higher degree, 2,286 (57.3%) had a post-high school certificate or diploma, and 990 (24.8%) people exclusively held high school qualifications. The median income was $37,500, compared with $41,500 nationally. 288 people (7.2%) earned over $100,000 compared to 12.1% nationally. The employment status of those at least 15 was 1,782 (44.7%) full-time, 543 (13.6%) part-time, and 72 (1.8%) unemployed.

Individual statistical areas
Name	Area (km^{2})	Population	Density (per km^{2})	Dwellings	Median age	Median income
Lansdowne West	2.28	1,779	780	732	43.5 years	$37,500
Lansdowne East	3.93	3,021	769	1,218	45.2 years	$37,500
New Zealand					38.1 years	$41,500

== Transport ==
Lansdowne is served by a suburban bus service, which runs four times a day on weekdays, connecting suburban residents to Masterton's CBD. Central Lansdowne is also approximately 2.8 km from Masterton railway station, which runs commuter trains from Masterton, through the Wairarapa Line, terminating at Wellington railway station.

== Education ==
Lakeview School is a co-educational state primary school for Year 1 to 8 students, with a roll of 573 as of October 2025. It opened in 2004 as a merger of Hiona Intermediate School (opened in 1972), Lansdowne School (opened 1909) and Totara Drive School (opened in 1968).
