= Masterton East =

Suburb of Masterton, New Zealand

- Suburb
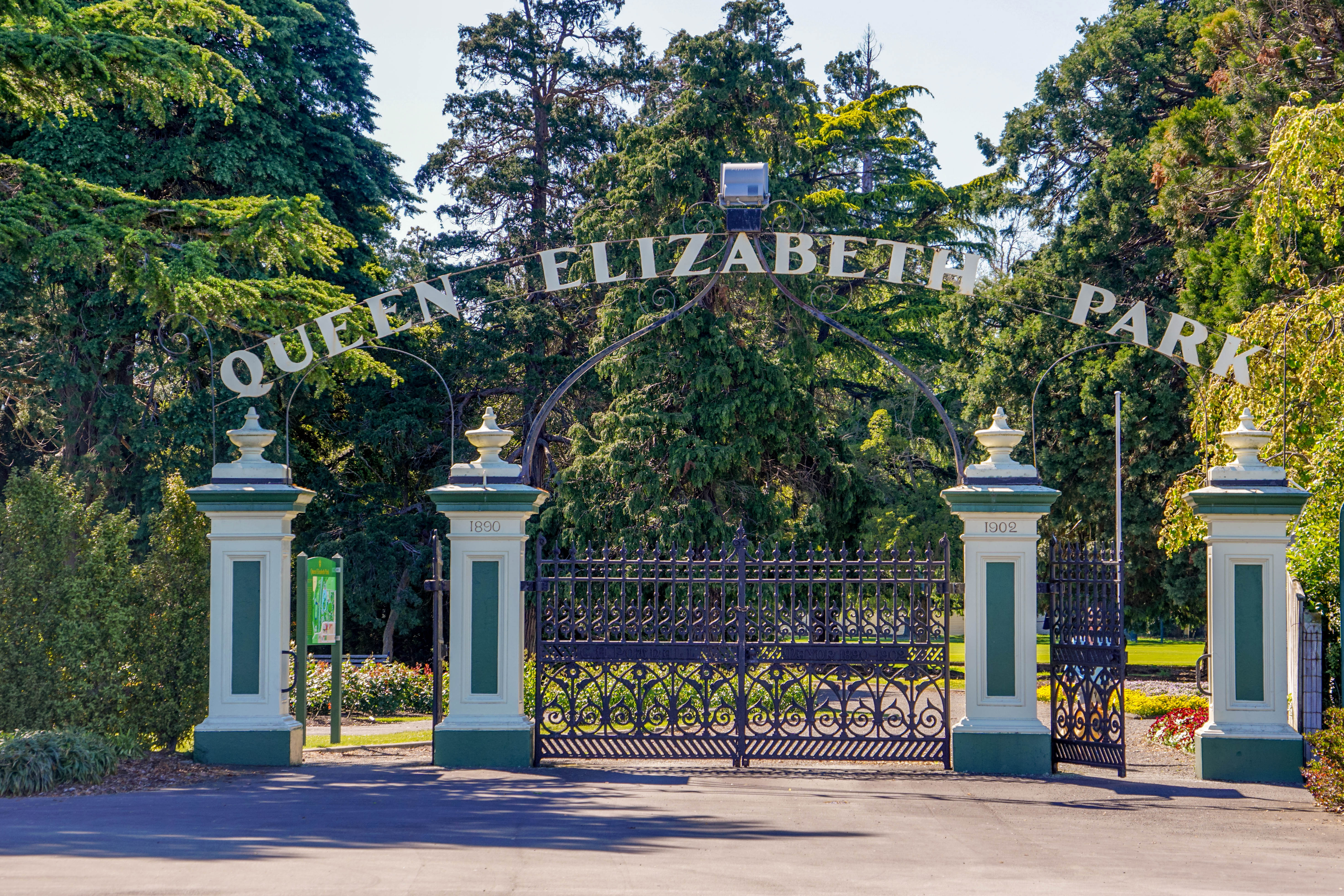
- Queen Elizabeth Park entrance
- Interactive map of Masterton East
- Coordinates: 40.958202°S 175.665622°E
- Country: New Zealand
- City: Masterton
- Local authority: Masterton District Council

Area
  - Land: 240 ha (590 acres)

Population (June 2025)
  - Total: 4,260
  - Density: 1,800/km^{2} (4,600/sq mi)

Masterton West	Masterton Central	Lansdowne
Kuripuni	Masterton East
Solway

Masterton East (also known as Eastside or Cameron Block) is a suburb of Masterton, a town on New Zealand's North Island.

It is a low socio-economic area with social housing, with about 15% of Masterton's population. About 30% of the population are Māori, primarily belonging to Rangitāne and Ngāti Kahungunu.

A central feature of the park is McJorrow Park, a soccer park. Playgrounds, an asphalt basketball court, a sunshade, seating and outside tables were installed in the park between 2015 and 2017.

The park features Te Awhina Cameron Community House, a community centre that hosts English as a Second Language classes, playgroup, cooking classes and furniture workshops. The building was renovated between 2013 and 2014.

In 2018, Masterton District Council and the Eastside Community Group worked on a project to slow vehicles through the area. Some cars were significantly damaged by one steep obstacle installed on River Road.

Later the same year, Massey University students developed ideas to improve the area, including further road changes and turning graffiti into public art. The ideas was passed on to the Eastside Community Group to consider.

== Demographics ==
Masterton East, comprising the statistical areas of Cameron and Soldiers Park and McJorrow Park, covers 2.40 km^{2} (0.93 sq mi). It had an estimated population of 4,260 as of June 2025, with a population density of 1,775 people per km^{2}.

Historical population
Year	Pop.	±% p.a.
2006	3,393	—
2013	3,576	+0.75%
2018	3,834	+1.40%
2023	4,011	+0.91%

Masterton East had a population of 4,011 in the 2023 New Zealand census, an increase of 177 people (4.6%) since the 2018 census, and an increase of 435 people (12.2%) since the 2013 census. There were 1,965 males, 2,028 females, and 18 people of other genders in 1,539 dwellings. 3.1% of people identified as LGBTIQ+. The median age was 36.5 years (compared with 38.1 years nationally). There were 834 people (20.8%) aged under 15 years, 813 (20.3%) aged 15 to 29, 1,629 (40.6%) aged 30 to 64, and 738 (18.4%) aged 65 or older.

People could identify as more than one ethnicity. The results were 71.9% European (Pākehā); 36.8% Māori; 8.9% Pasifika; 6.3% Asian; 0.4% Middle Eastern, Latin American and African New Zealanders (MELAA); and 2.4% other, which includes people giving their ethnicity as "New Zealander". English was spoken by 96.5%, Māori by 8.5%, Samoan by 3.0%, and other languages by 5.8%. No language could be spoken by 1.9% (e.g. too young to talk). New Zealand Sign Language was known by 0.7%. The percentage of people born overseas was 13.0, compared with 28.8% nationally.

Religious affiliations were 30.2% Christian, 0.7% Hindu, 1.0% Islam, 2.9% Māori religious beliefs, 0.4% Buddhist, 0.5% New Age, 0.1% Jewish, and 1.3% other religions. People who answered that they had no religion were 56.2%, and 7.0% of people did not answer the census question.

Of those at least 15 years old, 360 (11.3%) people had a bachelor's or higher degree, 1,758 (55.3%) had a post-high school certificate or diploma, and 1,059 (33.3%) people exclusively held high school qualifications. The median income was $31,600, compared with $41,500 nationally. 129 people (4.1%) earned over $100,000 compared to 12.1% nationally. The employment status of those at least 15 was 1,365 (43.0%) full-time, 405 (12.7%) part-time, and 129 (4.1%) unemployed.

Individual statistical areas
Name	Area (km^{2})	Population	Density (per km^{2})	Dwellings	Median age	Median income
Cameron and Soldiers Park	1.49	2,205	1,480	951	43.3 years	$32,900
McJorrow Park	0.91	1,806	1,985	588	31.4 years	$29,900
New Zealand					38.1 years	$41,500

== Education ==
Mākoura College is a co-educational state secondary school for Year 9 to 13 students, with a roll of 314 as of October 2025. It was founded in 1968.

The Wairarapa Teen Parent Unit is attached to the school.

Te Kura Kaupapa Māori o Wairarapa is a co-educational state Māori language immersion area school for Year 1 to 15 students, with a roll of 159. It opened in 1991.

Chanel College is a co-educational state-integrated Catholic secondary school for Year 7 to 13 students, with a roll of 317 as of October 2025. It was founded in 1978.
