= Miramar Christian School =

Co-educational primary school

Miramar Christian School was a state-integrated, co-educational primary school located in Miramar, Wellington, New Zealand. Founded in 1979, the school provided education from Year 1 to Year 8 with a strong Christian ethos, aiming to integrate biblical values alongside the New Zealand national curriculum.

== History ==
Miramar Christian School was established in 1979 to serve families seeking a faith-based education for their children. The school operated on the Miramar Peninsula at 41 Camperdown Road for over four decades, building a reputation for small class sizes and personalized attention to students.

In late 2024, the school began a transition and relocation to Johnsonville, Wellington. This move coincided with a rebranding to Wellington Hills Christian College, with plans to expand the school’s offerings to include secondary education (Years 9–13). The relocation was part of a broader initiative to grow the Christian education presence in the Wellington region.

== Campus and facilities ==
The original Miramar campus featured several classrooms grouped by age, a hall used for assemblies and community events, a netball court, and access to nearby parks such as Miramar Park and Scorching Bay. Classrooms were equipped with modern learning tools including interactive whiteboards and access to digital platforms like Google Classroom and See-Saw.

== Curriculum ==
Miramar Christian School followed the New Zealand Ministry of Education curriculum standards, from the perspective of a Christian worldview. The curriculum included core subjects such as literacy, numeracy, science, and social studies, with an emphasis on character development and spiritual growth. Teachers were fully qualified and committed to integrating faith and learning.

== Student body and community ==
The school served approximately 40 to 50 students, organized into three classes:

- Kowhai (Years 0–2)
- Totara (Years 2–4)
- Kauri (Years 5–8)

The small roll size fostered a close-knit community atmosphere, with strong involvement from families and local church groups. The school prioritized pastoral care and aimed to nurture students’ personal and spiritual growth.

== Governance and leadership ==
Miramar Christian School was governed by a Board of Trustees and owned by The Peniel Trust, a Christian proprietorship trust. The school was state-integrated, receiving government funding for operations while relying on attendance dues to maintain and develop facilities.

The last principal at the Miramar site was Kaye Gillies. Following the transition to Wellington Hills Christian College, leadership was taken over by Principal Tim Kuipers.

== Transition to Wellington Hills Christian College ==
In 2024, the school relocated to a larger campus in Johnsonville and expanded its vision to become Wellington Hills Christian College, offering education from Year 1 through to Year 13. This transition aimed to meet growing demand for Christian education in the region and provide continuity for students through their secondary schooling years.

The relocation and expansion are supported by the New Zealand Christian Proprietors Trust (NZCPT) and the Wellington Christian Education Project (WCEP).
