= Aotea, New Zealand =

Suburb of Porirua, New Zealand

Aotea
- Suburb
- Interactive map of Aotea
- Coordinates: 41.130°S 174.850°E
- Country: New Zealand
- City: Porirua City
- Local authority: Porirua City Council
- Electoral ward: Onepoto General Ward; Porirua Māori Ward

Area
  - Land: 268 ha (660 acres)

Population (June 2025)
  - Total: 4,510
  - Density: 1,680/km^{2} (4,360/sq mi)
- Postcode: 5024
- Railway stations: Porirua Station
- Ferry terminals: n/a
- Airports: n/a

(Porirua Harbour)	Papakōwhai	Ascot Park
	Aotea	Waitangirua
Porirua City Centre	Ranui	Cannons Creek

Aotea is a suburb of Porirua, New Zealand. The suburb has two children's playgrounds and a retirement home.

It covers an area of 2.68 km^{2}, including a land area of 2.68 km^{2}. The area is entirely inland, but many homes have coastal views.

== History ==
Earlier maps for the area showed Okowai and Strathaven as two separate localities in the area. Subdivision of the area started in the 2000s. The name Aotea was proposed and adopted for the suburb after the Aotea migration canoe

== Demography ==
Aotea statistical area covers 2.68 km^{2} (1.03 sq mi). It had an estimated population of 4,510 as of June 2025, with a population density of 1,683 people per km^{2}.

Historical population
Year	Pop.	±% p.a.
2006	117	—
2013	2,292	+52.96%
2018	3,138	+6.48%
2023	4,197	+5.99%

Aotea had a population of 4,197 in the 2023 New Zealand census, an increase of 1,059 people (33.7%) since the 2018 census, and an increase of 1,905 people (83.1%) since the 2013 census. There were 1,998 males, 2,184 females, and 15 people of other genders in 1,386 dwellings. 2.4% of people identified as LGBTIQ+. The median age was 39.3 years (compared with 38.1 years nationally). There were 975 people (23.2%) aged under 15 years, 570 (13.6%) aged 15 to 29, 2,070 (49.3%) aged 30 to 64, and 582 (13.9%) aged 65 or older.

People could identify as more than one ethnicity. The results were 63.0% European (Pākehā); 8.6% Māori; 8.8% Pasifika; 30.3% Asian; 1.4% Middle Eastern, Latin American and African New Zealanders (MELAA); and 2.4% other, which includes people giving their ethnicity as "New Zealander". English was spoken by 94.9%, Māori by 2.4%, Samoan by 2.7%, and other languages by 25.4%. No language could be spoken by 2.2% (e.g. too young to talk). New Zealand Sign Language was known by 0.6%. The percentage of people born overseas was 34.5, compared with 28.8% nationally.

Religious affiliations were 34.8% Christian, 7.4% Hindu, 2.5% Islam, 0.1% Māori religious beliefs, 2.1% Buddhist, 0.1% New Age, 0.1% Jewish, and 1.4% other religions. People who answered that they had no religion were 46.9%, and 4.6% of people did not answer the census question.

Of those at least 15 years old, 1,329 (41.2%) people had a bachelor's or higher degree, 1,380 (42.8%) had a post-high school certificate or diploma, and 507 (15.7%) people exclusively held high school qualifications. The median income was $67,500, compared with $41,500 nationally. 1,089 people (33.8%) earned over $100,000 compared to 12.1% nationally. The employment status of those at least 15 was 2,001 (62.1%) full-time, 360 (11.2%) part-time, and 48 (1.5%) unemployed.

== Economy ==
In 2018, 8% of the workforce worked in healthcare, 7.5% worked in education, 6% worked in construction, 4.2% worked in hospitality, 4.0% worked in transport, and 2.9% of the workforce worked in manufacturing.

== Transportation ==
As of 2018, among those who commute to work, 63.8% drove a car and 4.9% rode in a car. Less than 1% walked, ran, biked or took public transport to work.

== Education ==
Aotea College is a co-educational state secondary school for Year 9 to 13 students that was founded in 1978. It has a roll of 1,309 as of October 2025.
