= Waitangirua =

Suburb of Porirua City

- Suburb
- Interactive map of Waitangirua
- Coordinates: 41.129°S 174.880°E
- Country: New Zealand
- City: Porirua City
- Local authority: Porirua City Council
- Electoral ward: Onepoto General Ward; Porirua Māori Ward
- Established: 1960s

Area
  - Land: 122 ha (300 acres)

Population (June 2025)
  - Total: 4,430
  - Density: 3,630/km^{2} (9,400/sq mi)

Ascot Park		Whitby
Aotea	Waitangirua
Cannons Creek

Waitangirua is a suburb of Porirua City approximately 22km north of Wellington in New Zealand.

Waitangirua was established during the 1960s, almost exclusively as a Government housing development for New Zealand's burgeoning working class immigrant population. As such the ethnic demographic of Waitangirua at the time of establishment comprising primarily Pacific Island, Scottish, Indian, Irish, English and Chinese as well as Māori. Many of the original settling families still live in Waitangirua today.

The hilly suburb until the late 90s was almost semi-rural surrounded by farmland with Whitby to the North East, Pauatahanui Inlet and Estuary further to the North, and the Belmont hills and Hutt Valley to the East.

The diverse multi-racial nature of Waitangirua makes for a colourful community dominated by a vibrant and exuberant youth culture.

Several scenes from the Taika Waititi film Eagle vs Shark were shot on location in Waitangirua.

== Demographics ==
Waitangirua covers 1.22 km^{2} (0.47 sq mi). It had an estimated population of 4,430 as of June 2025, with a population density of 3,631 people per km^{2}.

Historical population
Year	Pop.	±% p.a.
2006	4,071	—
2013	4,020	−0.18%
2018	4,398	+1.81%
2023	4,290	−0.50%

Waitangirua had a population of 4,290 in the 2023 New Zealand census, a decrease of 108 people (−2.5%) since the 2018 census, and an increase of 270 people (6.7%) since the 2013 census. There were 2,073 males, 2,205 females, and 12 people of other genders in 1,032 dwellings. 2.0% of people identified as LGBTIQ+. The median age was 28.8 years (compared with 38.1 years nationally). There were 1,095 people (25.5%) aged under 15 years, 1,137 (26.5%) aged 15 to 29, 1,707 (39.8%) aged 30 to 64, and 351 (8.2%) aged 65 or older.

People could identify as more than one ethnicity. The results were 22.1% European (Pākehā); 29.9% Māori; 64.3% Pasifika; 10.6% Asian; 1.5% Middle Eastern, Latin American and African New Zealanders (MELAA); and 0.7% other, which includes people giving their ethnicity as "New Zealander". English was spoken by 92.2%, Māori by 7.5%, Samoan by 24.5%, and other languages by 16.4%. No language could be spoken by 2.5% (e.g. too young to talk). New Zealand Sign Language was known by 0.7%. The percentage of people born overseas was 29.8, compared with 28.8% nationally.

Religious affiliations were 56.2% Christian, 0.8% Hindu, 2.0% Islam, 2.1% Māori religious beliefs, 1.3% Buddhist, 0.2% New Age, and 0.8% other religions. People who answered that they had no religion were 29.9%, and 7.2% of people did not answer the census question.

Of those at least 15 years old, 291 (9.1%) people had a bachelor's or higher degree, 1,701 (53.2%) had a post-high school certificate or diploma, and 1,212 (37.9%) people exclusively held high school qualifications. The median income was $29,500, compared with $41,500 nationally. 87 people (2.7%) earned over $100,000 compared to 12.1% nationally. The employment status of those at least 15 was 1,440 (45.1%) full-time, 318 (10.0%) part-time, and 231 (7.2%) unemployed.

Individual statistical areas
Name	Area (km^{2})	Population	Density (per km^{2})	Dwellings	Median age	Median income
Waitangirua Tairangi	0.51	1,446	2,835	357	28.8 years	$28,700
Waitangirua Corinna	0.71	2,844	4,006	675	28.8 years	$29,900
New Zealand					38.1 years	$41,500

== Education ==
Corinna School is a state primary school for Year 1 to 6 students, with a roll of 172. It opened in 1967.

Natone Park School is a state primary school for Year 1 to 6 students. It teaches mostly in the Māori language. It has a roll of 111. It opened in 1975 as a side school to reduce crowding at Corinna and Tairangi schools, and was initially expected to be temporary. Attempts to close the school in 1983 and 1988 were resisted by the community. In 1990, the school became permanent. A bi-lingual English and Māori unit was established in 1985.

Tairangi School is a state primary school for Year 1 to 8 students, with a roll of 159. It announced its 50th anniversary in 2019.

Te Kura Māori O Porirua is a state Māori language immersion primary school for Year 1 to 13 students, with a roll of 310. It opened in 2009.

All these schools are co-educational. Rolls are as of October 2025.
