= Waitohu =

Settlement in Wellington Region, New Zealand

- Settlement
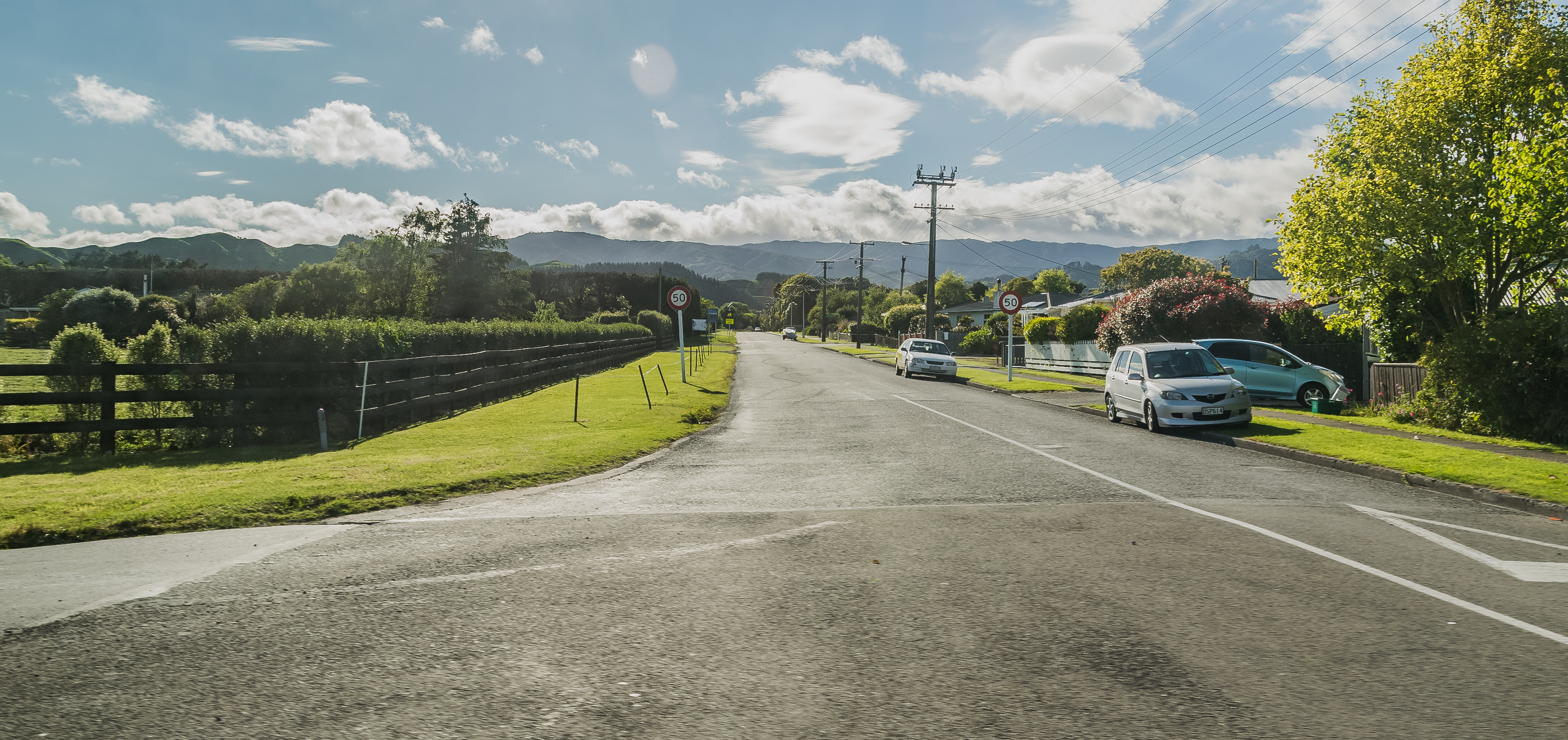
- Waitohu Valley Road
- Interactive map of Waitohu
- Coordinates: 40.759°S 175.167°E
- Country: New Zealand
- Region: Wellington Region
- Territorial authority: Kāpiti Coast District
- Ward: Ōtaki Ward
- Community: Ōtaki Community
- Electorates: Kapiti; Te Tai Hauāuru (Māori)

Government
  - Territorial Authority: Kāpiti Coast District Council
  - Regional council: Greater Wellington Regional Council
  - Kāpiti Coast Mayor: Janet Holborow
  - Kapiti MP: Tim Costley
  - Te Tai Hauāuru MP: Debbie Ngarewa-Packer

Area
  - Total: 4.16 km^{2} (1.61 sq mi)

Population (June 2025)
  - Total: 1,330
  - Density: 320/km^{2} (828/sq mi)

Waitohu is a settlement in the Kāpiti Coast District of the Wellington Region of New Zealand's North Island. It is located east of Ōtaki, separated by the North Island Main Trunk railway line. Waitohu Valley Road runs southeast from State Highway 1 along the Waitohu Stream, and then leaves the stream and turns northeast.

== Demographics ==
Waitohu covers 4.16 km^{2} (1.61 sq mi). It had an estimated population of 1,330 as of June 2025, with a population density of 320 people per km^{2}.

Historical population
Year	Pop.	±% p.a.
2006	921	—
2013	1,059	+2.01%
2018	1,122	+1.16%
2023	1,251	+2.20%
The 2006 population is for a larger area of 4.23 km^{2}. Source:

Waitohu had a population of 1,251 in the 2023 New Zealand census, an increase of 129 people (11.5%) since the 2018 census, and an increase of 192 people (18.1%) since the 2013 census. There were 591 males, 657 females, and 3 people of other genders in 486 dwellings. 2.6% of people identified as LGBTIQ+. The median age was 42.4 years (compared with 38.1 years nationally). There were 255 people (20.4%) aged under 15 years, 213 (17.0%) aged 15 to 29, 492 (39.3%) aged 30 to 64, and 291 (23.3%) aged 65 or older.

People could identify as more than one ethnicity. The results were 77.5% European (Pākehā); 31.7% Māori; 5.8% Pasifika; 5.0% Asian; 0.2% Middle Eastern, Latin American and African New Zealanders (MELAA); and 1.7% other, which includes people giving their ethnicity as "New Zealander". English was spoken by 95.9%, Māori by 14.9%, Samoan by 1.0%, and other languages by 8.4%. No language could be spoken by 2.9% (e.g. too young to talk). New Zealand Sign Language was known by 0.7%. The percentage of people born overseas was 16.3, compared with 28.8% nationally.

Religious affiliations were 33.1% Christian, 0.7% Hindu, 0.2% Islam, 1.4% Māori religious beliefs, 0.2% Buddhist, 1.0% New Age, and 1.2% other religions. People who answered that they had no religion were 54.2%, and 8.6% of people did not answer the census question.

Of those at least 15 years old, 225 (22.6%) people had a bachelor's or higher degree, 531 (53.3%) had a post-high school certificate or diploma, and 243 (24.4%) people exclusively held high school qualifications. The median income was $40,900, compared with $41,500 nationally. 99 people (9.9%) earned over $100,000 compared to 12.1% nationally. The employment status of those at least 15 was 495 (49.7%) full-time, 132 (13.3%) part-time, and 21 (2.1%) unemployed.

== Education ==
Waitohu School is a co-educational state primary school for Year 1 to 6 students with a roll of 233 as of July 2026. The school opened in 1963.
