= Papakōwhai =

Suburb of Porirua, New Zealand

Coordinates: 41.113°S 174.868°E

- Suburb
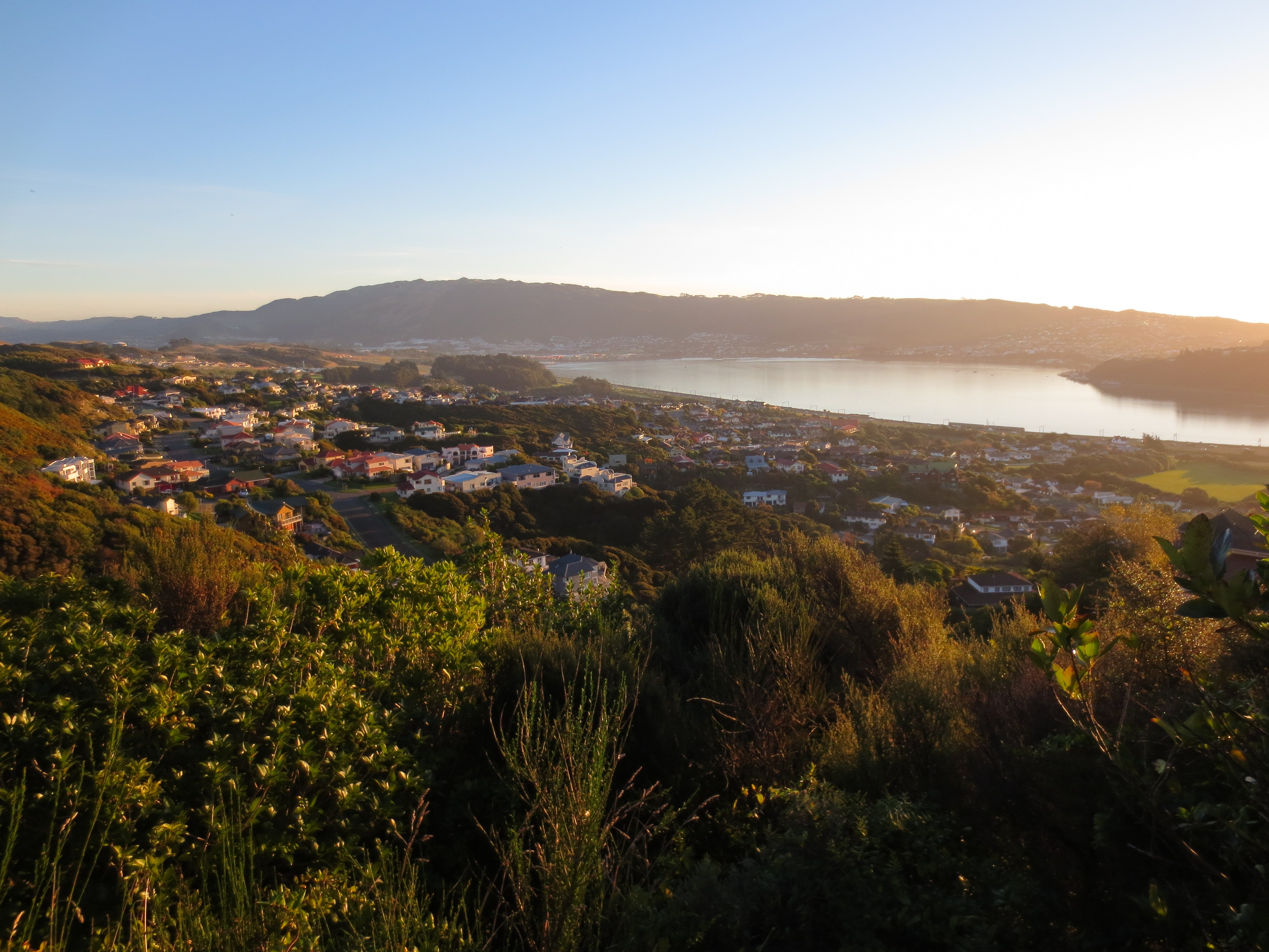
- A view from the north-east: Porirua Harbour to the right, Porirua city centre and Rangituhi/Colonial Knob ridge in the background
- Interactive map of Papakōwhai
- Country: New Zealand
- City: Porirua City
- Local authority: Porirua City Council
- Electoral ward: Pāuatahanui General Ward; Porirua Māori Ward

Area
  - Land: 143 ha (350 acres)

Population (June 2025)
  - Total: 2,360
  - Density: 1,650/km^{2} (4,270/sq mi)
- Postcode: 5024

| (Porirua Harbour) | | Paremata |
| | Papakōwhai | Ascot Park |
| | Aotea |

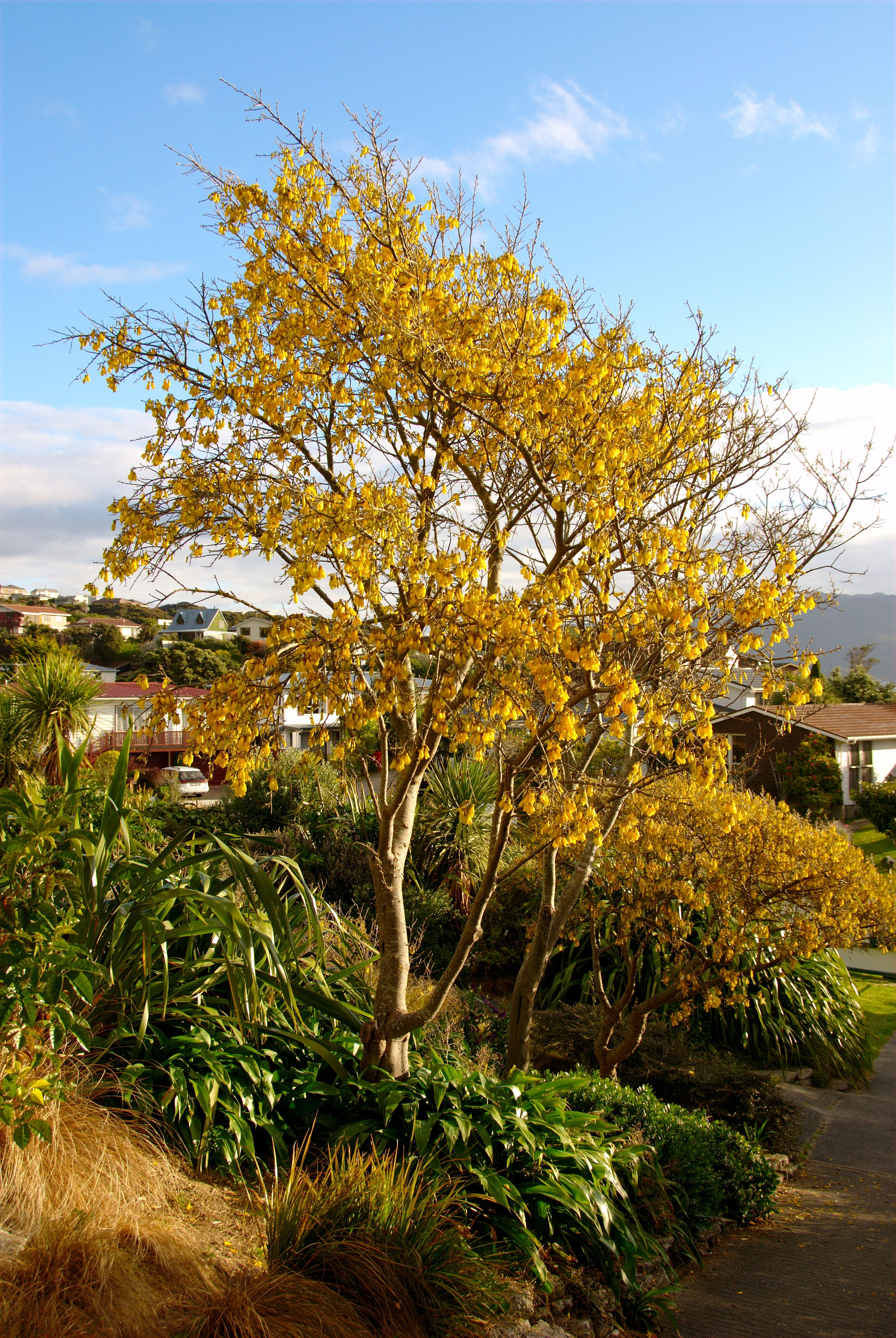
Kōwhai tree in bloom at Papakowhai School

Papakōwhai is a suburb of Porirua City. It lies approximately 22 kilometres (14 mi) north of Wellington in New Zealand.

The name "Papakōwhai" (Māori pronunciation: [papaˈkɔfai]) in the Māori language means "yellow earth". As well as being the name of the suburb it is the name of the main road connecting the suburb to the south. Most of the other streets in Papakōwhai take their names from Scottish rivers.

The first European known to have settled in the area was William Bowler in the early 19th century.

As of 2016 Papakōwhai includes the Royal New Zealand Police College and Aotea Lagoon public park.

== Demographics ==
Papakōwhai statistical area covers 1.43 km^{2} (0.55 sq mi). It had an estimated population of 2,360 as of June 2025, with a population density of 1,650 people per km^{2}.

Historical population
| Year | Pop. | ±% p.a. |
|---|---|---|
| 2006 | 2,304 | — |
| 2013 | 2,280 | −0.15% |
| 2018 | 2,268 | −0.11% |
| 2023 | 2,298 | +0.26% |

Papakōwhai had a population of 2,298 in the 2023 New Zealand census, an increase of 30 people (1.3%) since the 2018 census, and an increase of 18 people (0.8%) since the 2013 census. There were 1,125 males, 1,164 females, and 9 people of other genders in 759 dwellings. 3.8% of people identified as LGBTIQ+. The median age was 40.0 years (compared with 38.1 years nationally). There were 465 people (20.2%) aged under 15 years, 366 (15.9%) aged 15 to 29, 1,101 (47.9%) aged 30 to 64, and 369 (16.1%) aged 65 or older.

People could identify as more than one ethnicity. The results were 78.9% European (Pākehā); 16.6% Māori; 10.4% Pasifika; 10.6% Asian; 2.0% Middle Eastern, Latin American and African New Zealanders (MELAA); and 1.2% other, which includes people giving their ethnicity as "New Zealander". English was spoken by 96.6%, Māori by 3.4%, Samoan by 2.0%, and other languages by 13.1%. No language could be spoken by 2.3% (e.g. too young to talk). New Zealand Sign Language was known by 0.9%. The percentage of people born overseas was 24.3, compared with 28.8% nationally.

Religious affiliations were 33.8% Christian, 2.2% Hindu, 1.2% Islam, 0.4% Māori religious beliefs, 0.8% Buddhist, 0.1% New Age, and 1.6% other religions. People who answered that they had no religion were 54.7%, and 5.2% of people did not answer the census question.

Of those at least 15 years old, 618 (33.7%) people had a bachelor's or higher degree, 912 (49.8%) had a post-high school certificate or diploma, and 306 (16.7%) people exclusively held high school qualifications. The median income was $55,900, compared with $41,500 nationally. 396 people (21.6%) earned over $100,000 compared to 12.1% nationally. The employment status of those at least 15 was 1,071 (58.4%) full-time, 258 (14.1%) part-time, and 36 (2.0%) unemployed.

== Education ==
Papakōwhai School is a co-educational state primary school for Year 1 to 8 students, with a roll of 498 as of October 2025. It opened in 1976.
