= Ascot Park, New Zealand =

Suburb of Porirua

Ascot Park
- Suburb
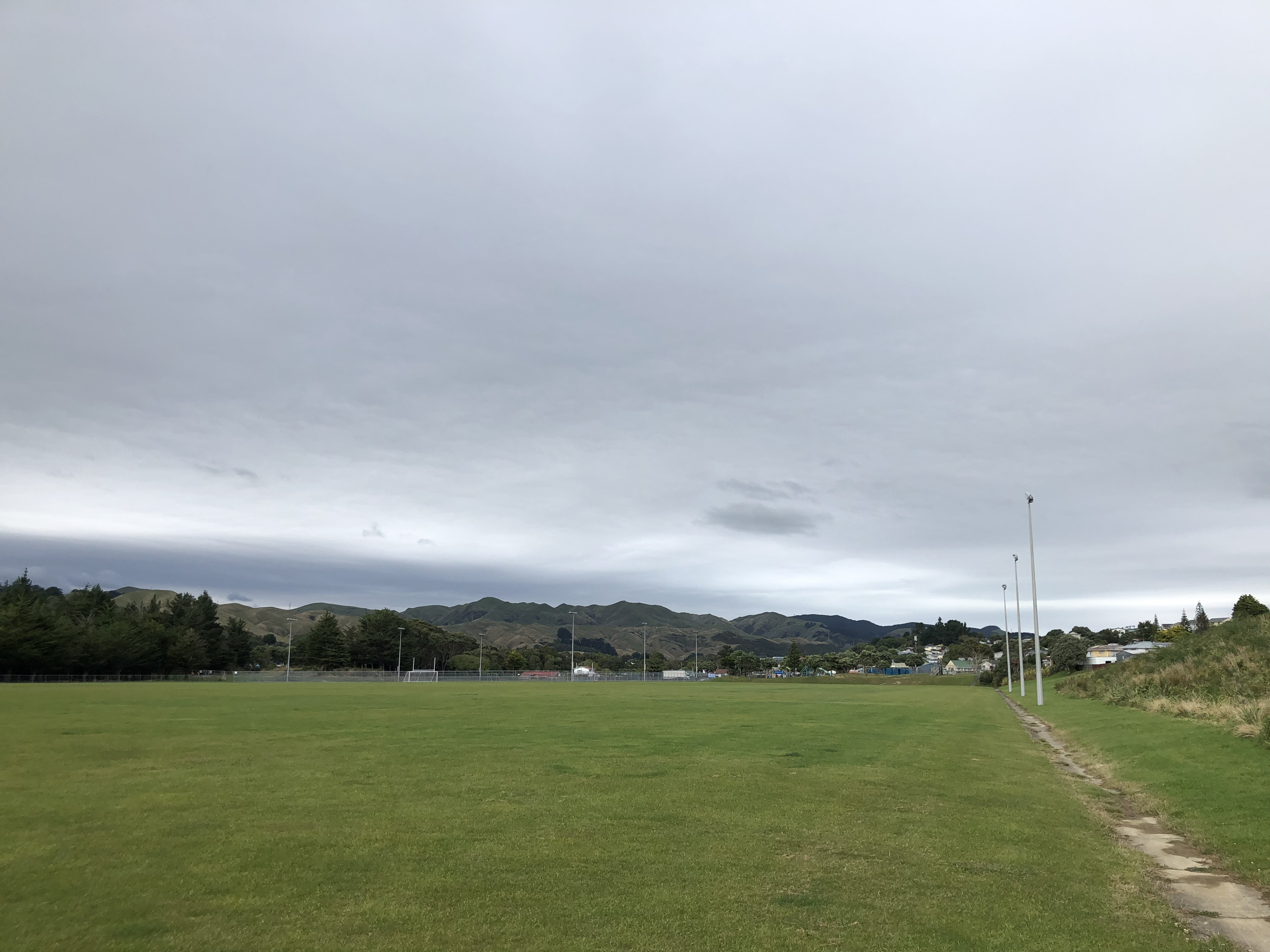
- Ascot Park Reserve
- Interactive map of Ascot Park
- Coordinates: 41°7′20″S 174°52′25″E
- Country: New Zealand
- City: Porirua City
- Local authority: Porirua City Council
- Electoral ward: Onepoto General Ward; Porirua Māori Ward

Area
  - Land: 90 ha (220 acres)

Population (June 2025)
  - Total: 2,900
  - Density: 3,200/km^{2} (8,300/sq mi)

Papakōwhai	Paremata	Whitby
	Ascot Park
Aotea		Waitangirua

Ascot Park is a suburb of Porirua City approximately 22 kilometres (14 mi) north of Wellington in New Zealand.

Ascot Park covers approximately 90 ha (220 acres).

== Etymology ==
The name Ascot Park was proposed in 1969 by Hec Stuart and Rex Willing, both Porirua City councillors, after Ascot Racecourse in Berkshire, England. Stuart and Willing also named the suburb's streets after famous racehorses.

== Description ==
Ascot Park is a residential suburb covering approximately 90 ha (220 acres).

== Demography ==
Ascot Park statistical area covers 1.12 km^{2} (0.43 sq mi). It had an estimated population of 2,900 as of June 2025, with a population density of 2,589.29 people per km^{2}.

Historical population
Year	Pop.	±% p.a.
2006	2,661	—
2013	2,625	−0.19%
2018	2,862	+1.74%
2023	2,823	−0.27%

Ascot Park had a population of 2,823 in the 2023 New Zealand census, a decrease of 39 people (−1.4%) since the 2018 census, and an increase of 198 people (7.5%) since the 2013 census. There were 1,350 males, 1,470 females, and 3 people of other genders in 798 dwellings. 3.2% of people identified as LGBTIQ+. The median age was 33.6 years (compared with 38.1 years nationally). There were 666 people (23.6%) aged under 15 years, 576 (20.4%) aged 15 to 29, 1,272 (45.1%) aged 30 to 64, and 309 (10.9%) aged 65 or older.

People could identify as more than one ethnicity. The results were 44.6% European (Pākehā); 30.4% Māori; 43.8% Pasifika; 12.2% Asian; 1.3% Middle Eastern, Latin American and African New Zealanders (MELAA); and 1.9% other, which includes people giving their ethnicity as "New Zealander". English was spoken by 93.7%, Māori by 8.1%, Samoan by 12.9%, and other languages by 14.3%. No language could be spoken by 2.9% (e.g. too young to talk). New Zealand Sign Language was known by 1.1%. The percentage of people born overseas was 22.6, compared with 28.8% nationally.

Religious affiliations were 41.8% Christian, 1.6% Hindu, 1.5% Islam, 1.7% Māori religious beliefs, 1.6% Buddhist, 0.3% New Age, and 0.7% other religions. People who answered that they had no religion were 41.6%, and 9.4% of people did not answer the census question.

Of those at least 15 years old, 357 (16.6%) people had a bachelor's or higher degree, 1,197 (55.5%) had a post-high school certificate or diploma, and 606 (28.1%) people exclusively held high school qualifications. The median income was $41,900, compared with $41,500 nationally. 189 people (8.8%) earned over $100,000 compared to 12.1% nationally. The employment status of those at least 15 was 1,164 (54.0%) full-time, 240 (11.1%) part-time, and 87 (4.0%) unemployed.

== Education ==
Rangikura School is a co-educational state primary school for Year 1 to 8 students, with a roll of 374 as of October 2025. It opened in 1975, and became a full primary school (including years 7 and 8) in 1992.

Ascot Park Kindergarten is also located in Ascot Park.
