= Otari School =

School in Wellington, New Zealand

Ōtari School
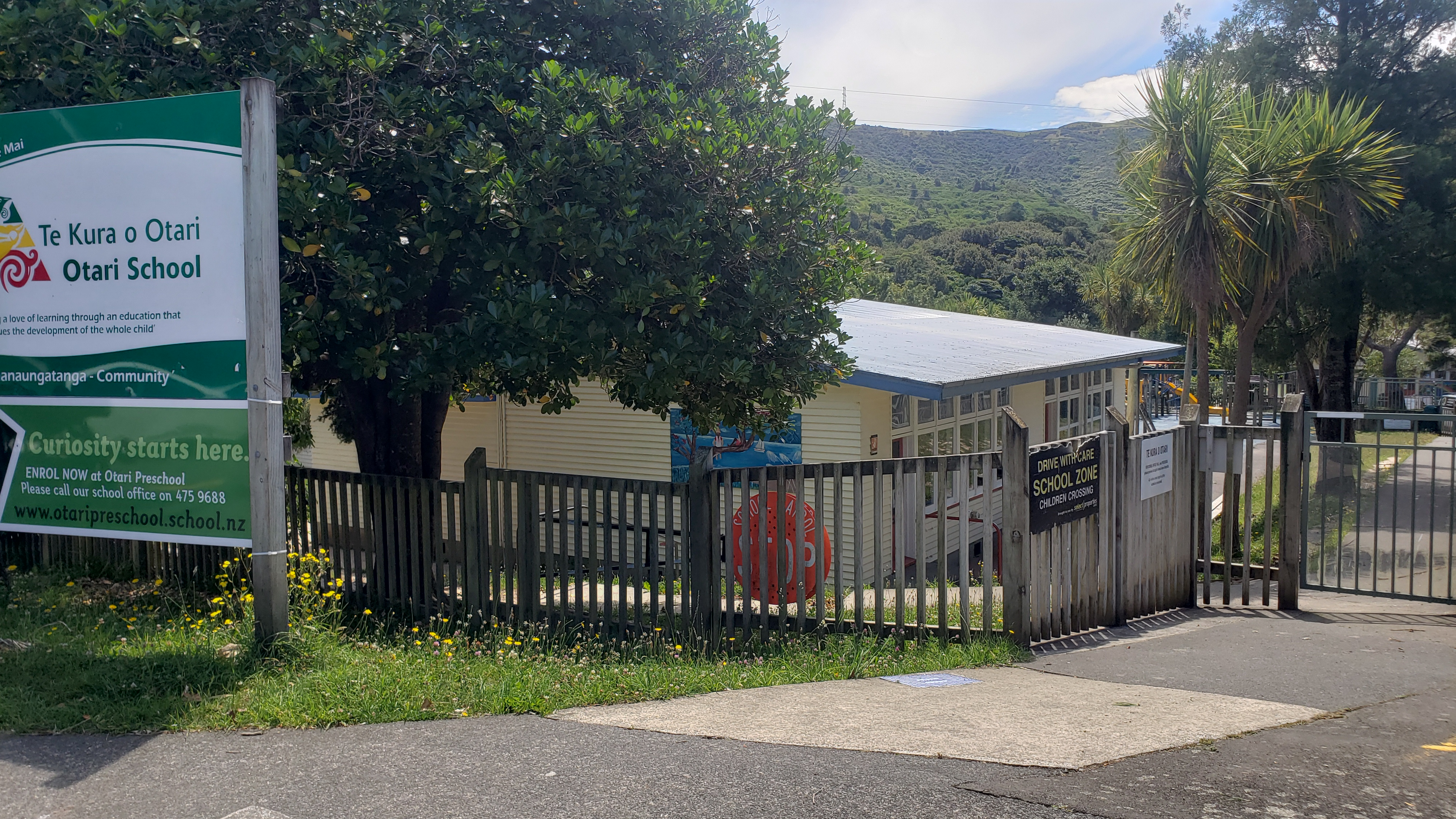

Location
- 166 Wilton Road, Wilton, Wellington; 41°16′5″S 174°45′22″E

Information
- Type: State, Co-educational, Full primary Years 1-8
- Established: 1956
- Ministry of Education Institution no.: 3073
- Principal: Clifford Wicks
- Enrolment: 198 (July 2026)
- Socio-economic decile: 10
- Website: otari.school.nz

Ōtari School is a state primary school in Wellington, New Zealand, formerly known as Wilton School. It is divided into three strands: one that teaches in the manner conventional to New Zealand schools, a Māori immersion stream, and a strand based around the principles of Montessori teaching. It has a focus on the environment. The school is located next to Ōtari-Wilton's Bush, a botanical garden dedicated to native plants.

The school is also the site of Montessori at Ōtari Preschool. As of 2025, the principal is Clifford Wicks.
