= Manawatū =

Manawatū or Manawatu may refer to:

== Places ==
- Manawatū District, New Zealand
- Manawatū Estuary, New Zealand
- Manawatū Plains, New Zealand
- Manawatū River, New Zealand
- Manawatū Gorge, New Zealand

== Sport ==
- Manawatu (National Provincial Championship), a rugby team
- Manawatu Jets, a basketball team
- Manawatu Rugby Union, a sports body
- Manawatu United, a football club

== Other ==
- Manawatū Standard, a daily paper

== See also ==
- Manawatū-Whanganui, region of New Zealand
