= Kahutara, New Zealand =

Rural locality in the Wellington Region, New Zealand

Kahutara
- Locality
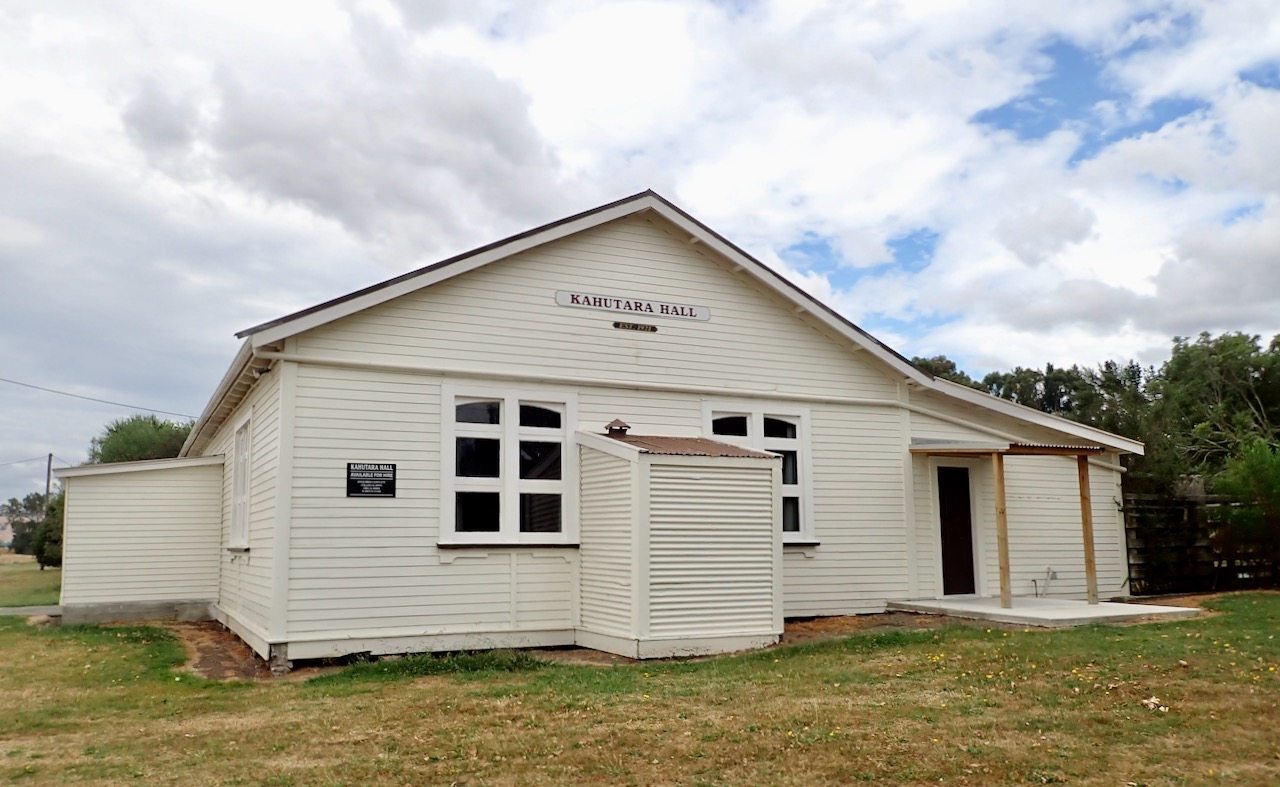
- Kahutara Hall
- Interactive map of Kahutara
- Coordinates: 41.228°S 175.344°E
- Region: Wellington Region
- Territorial authority: South Wairarapa District
- Ward: Martinborough Ward
- Community: Martinborough Community
- Electorates: Wairarapa; Ikaroa-Rāwhiti (Māori)

Government
  - Territorial Authority: South Wairarapa District Council
  - Regional council: Greater Wellington Regional Council
  - Mayor of South Wairarapa: Fran Wilde
  - Wairarapa MP: Mike Butterick
  - Ikaroa-Rāwhiti MP: Cushla Tangaere-Manuel

Area
  - Total: 158.51 km^{2} (61.20 sq mi)

Population (2023 Census)
  - Total: 534
  - Density: 3.37/km^{2} (8.73/sq mi)

Kahutara is a rural locality and a statistical area in the South Wairarapa District and Wellington Region of New Zealand's North Island. The locality is east of Lake Wairarapa and west of Martinborough. The statistical area covers the area around Lake Wairarapa and extends southwest to Ocean Beach on Palliser Bay.

== Demographics ==
Kahutara locality covers 158.51 km^{2} (61.20 sq mi). It is part of the larger Kahutara statistical area.

Historical population for Kahutara locality
Year	Pop.	±% p.a.
2006	450	—
2013	471	+0.65%
2018	480	+0.38%
2023	534	+2.16%

The locality had a population of 534 in the 2023 New Zealand census, an increase of 54 people (11.2%) since the 2018 census, and an increase of 63 people (13.4%) since the 2013 census. There were 294 males, 240 females, and 6 people of other genders in 189 dwellings. 3.4% of people identified as LGBTIQ+. There were 126 people (23.6%) aged under 15 years, 87 (16.3%) aged 15 to 29, 258 (48.3%) aged 30 to 64, and 63 (11.8%) aged 65 or older.

People could identify as more than one ethnicity. The results were 92.1% European (Pākehā), 18.5% Māori, 1.1% Pasifika, 1.1% Asian, and 4.5% other, which includes people giving their ethnicity as "New Zealander". English was spoken by 97.2%, Māori by 3.4%, Samoan by 0.6%, and other languages by 4.5%. No language could be spoken by 2.2% (e.g. too young to talk). The percentage of people born overseas was 10.7, compared with 28.8% nationally.

Religious affiliations were 23.6% Christian, 0.6% Māori religious beliefs, and 0.6% New Age. People who answered that they had no religion were 67.4%, and 7.3% of people did not answer the census question.

Of those at least 15 years old, 78 (19.1%) people had a bachelor's or higher degree, 240 (58.8%) had a post-high school certificate or diploma, and 84 (20.6%) people exclusively held high school qualifications. 42 people (10.3%) earned over $100,000 compared to 12.1% nationally. The employment status of those at least 15 was 252 (61.8%) full-time and 69 (16.9%) part-time.

=== Kahutara statistical area ===
Kahutara statistical area covers 458.01 km^{2} (176.84 sq mi) and had an estimated population of 1,220 as of June 2025, with a population density of 2.7 people per km^{2}.

Historical population for Kahutara statistical area
Year	Pop.	±% p.a.
2006	933	—
2013	975	+0.63%
2018	1,035	+1.20%
2023	1,128	+1.74%

The statistical area had a population of 1,128 in the 2023 New Zealand census, an increase of 93 people (9.0%) since the 2018 census, and an increase of 153 people (15.7%) since the 2013 census. There were 594 males, 531 females, and 6 people of other genders in 441 dwellings. 4.0% of people identified as LGBTIQ+. The median age was 39.7 years (compared with 38.1 years nationally). There were 219 people (19.4%) aged under 15 years, 186 (16.5%) aged 15 to 29, 558 (49.5%) aged 30 to 64, and 165 (14.6%) aged 65 or older.

People could identify as more than one ethnicity. The results were 92.3% European (Pākehā); 16.8% Māori; 1.9% Pasifika; 1.9% Asian; 0.3% Middle Eastern, Latin American and African New Zealanders (MELAA); and 3.2% other, which includes people giving their ethnicity as "New Zealander". English was spoken by 97.3%, Māori by 2.7%, Samoan by 0.5%, and other languages by 6.6%. No language could be spoken by 2.4% (e.g. too young to talk). New Zealand Sign Language was known by 0.5%. The percentage of people born overseas was 14.9, compared with 28.8% nationally.

Religious affiliations were 26.1% Christian, 0.3% Hindu, 0.3% Māori religious beliefs, 0.5% New Age, 0.3% Jewish, and 0.3% other religions. People who answered that they had no religion were 66.0%, and 6.4% of people did not answer the census question.

Of those at least 15 years old, 204 (22.4%) people had a bachelor's or higher degree, 525 (57.8%) had a post-high school certificate or diploma, and 183 (20.1%) people exclusively held high school qualifications. The median income was $46,600, compared with $41,500 nationally. 120 people (13.2%) earned over $100,000 compared to 12.1% nationally. The employment status of those at least 15 was 534 (58.7%) full-time, 153 (16.8%) part-time, and 9 (1.0%) unemployed.

== Education ==
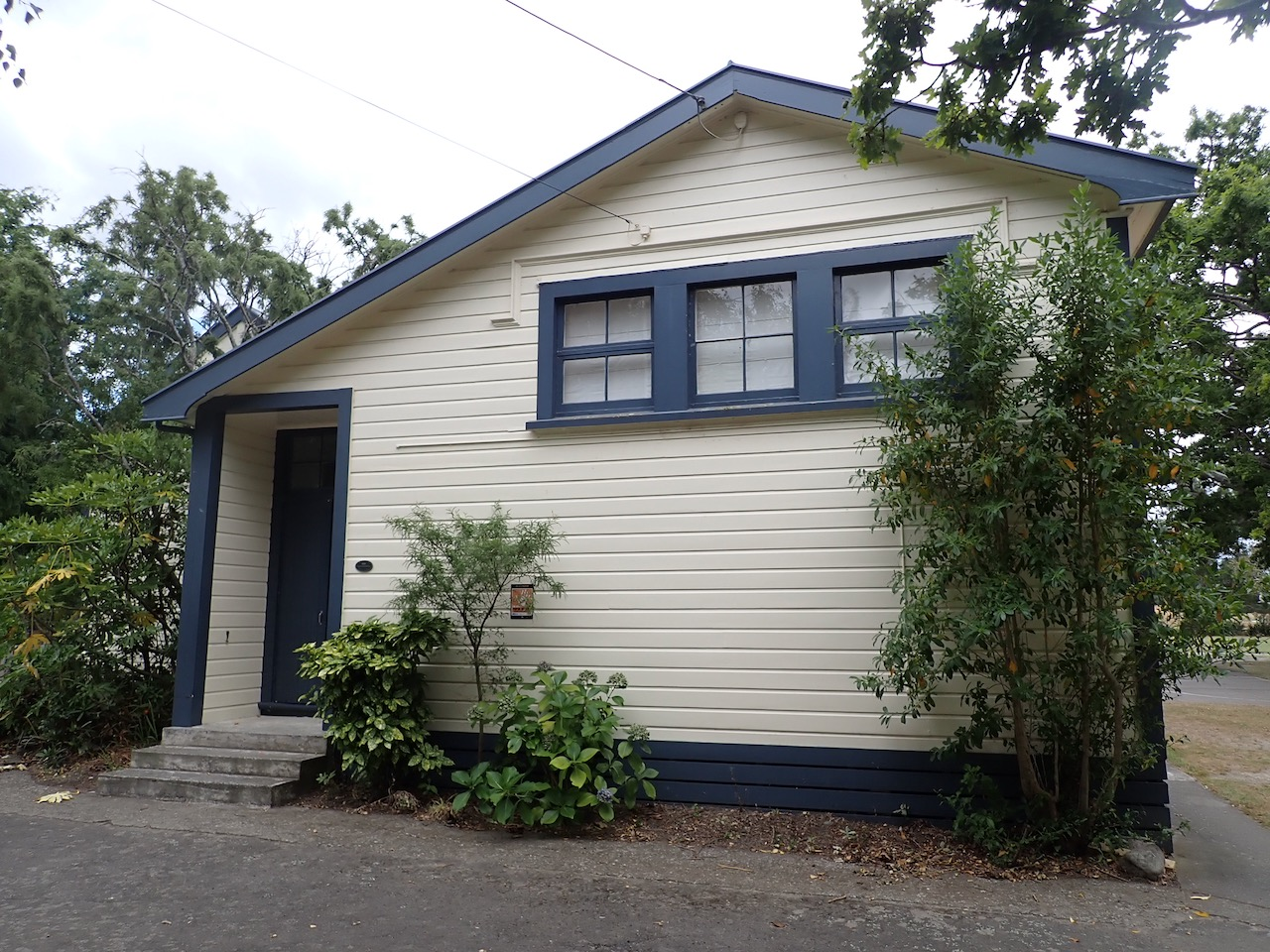
Kahutara School

Kahutara School is a co-educational state primary school for Year 1 to 8 students, with a roll of 90 as of July 2026. The school was founded in 1898.
