= Wairarapa College =

Location
- 83 Pownall Street; Masterton 5810; New Zealand; 40.950717°S 175.646494°E

Information
- Funding type: State
- Established: 1938
- Ministry of Education Institution no.: 241
- Principal: Matt White
- Years offered: 9–13
- Gender: Coeducational
- Enrolment: 949 (July 2026)
- Colours: Blue and gold
- Socio-economic decile: 6N
- Website: waicol.co.nz

Wairarapa College is a state coeducational secondary school located in Masterton, New Zealand. The college first opened in 1938, following the merger of Wairarapa High School with the Masterton Technical School. Serving Years 9 to 13, the college has 949 students as of July 2026.

== History ==
Secondary education started in Masterton in 1884 when the Masterton Central School became the Masterton District High School and started accepting secondary students. However, the district high school was short-lived and the school reverted to primary only at the end of 1885.

The Masterton Technical School opened in 1897, offering technical secondary education. In 1908 it became the Seddon Memorial Technical School and moved to a purpose-built building in Dixon Street. While the second storey was removed after the 1942 Wairarapa earthquakes, the building still stands today as the Lone Star restaurant.

In 1902, the Masterton District High School was re-established at Masterton Central School in Russell Street. In 1922, the decision was made to separate the secondary component of the District High School. A 30-acre (12 ha) site was purchased in Pownall Street for £2276 (NZ$4552), and in 1923, Wairarapa High School opened on the site. The District High School, now with only primary students, reverted to Masterton Central School, later moving to South Road in 1970 and merging with Harley Street School in 2004 to form today's Masterton Primary School.

Wairarapa College was founded in 1937 following the decision to merge Wairarapa High School and the Masterton Technical School, and the new college opened in 1938 on the High School site with 521 students.

Until 1960, it was the only full secondary school in the Wairarapa region, with district high schools (similar to today's composite and area schools) in the other seven Wairarapa towns. As the post-WWII baby boom picked up, Wairarapa College began to overcrowd, and with the movement away from district high schools to separate full high schools, two new secondary schools, Tararua College in Pahiatua and Kuranui College in Greytown opened in 1960 to replace the district high schools and to relieve pressure on Wairarapa College. However, as the baby boom generation moved through secondary school, Wairarapa College soon became overcrowded again. Originally it was planned to split Wairarapa College into two single-sex schools on the same site, but this was later dropped and in 1968, Makora College opened on the east side of Masterton to relieve the school roll, Between 1968 and 1989, Wairarapa College and Makora College shared a board of governors. In 1989, the Tomorrow's Schools reforms dissolved the joint board and both schools became self-governing through parent-elected boards of trustees.

In June 2002, an arson attack on the school destroyed several classrooms and caused $1 million in property damage. Subsequently, the school developed a new 1200-seat auditorium and performing arts centre from the insurance payout and government property development funds.

== Enrolment ==
Until August 2013, Wairarapa College operated an enrolment scheme to help curb roll numbers and prevent overcrowding. The school's home zone, in which students residing were automatically entitled to be enrolled without rejection, covered the western half of the Masterton township and the rural area to the northwest, west and southwest of the town, bounded by Mikimiki Road to the north, State Highway 2 to the east, Wiltons Line in the south, and the Tararua Ranges in the west. In September 2013, the enrolment scheme was removed, meaning any eligible student may enrol without rejection.

At the October 2013 Education Review Office (ERO) review of the school, Wairarapa College had 942 students enrolled, including six international students and 112 students living in College House. The school roll's gender composition was 54% male and 46% female, and its ethnic composition was 69% New Zealand European (Pākehā), 22% Māori, 3% Asian, 2% Samoan, and 4% Other.

As of 2026, Wairarapa College has an Equity Index of 479, placing it amongst schools whose students have above average socioeconomic barriers to achievement (roughly equivalent to decile 4 under the former socio-economic decile system).

== Principals ==
Wairarapa High School

Period	Principal
1923–1930	Dr. G.H. Uttley
1930–1937	H.B. Tomlinson
1937	G.W. Morice (acting)

Wairarapa College

Period	Principal
1938–1951	George Gilbert Hancox
1951–1959	W.I. Shrimpton
1960–1968	T.G. Holmes
1969–1982	George Sutherland
1983–1988	John Carlyon
1988–2003	Alwyn Williams
2003–2016	Mike Schwass
2016–2019	Shelley Power
2020	Pam Redpath (acting)
2020	Michele Whiting (acting)
2021–present	Matt White

== Notable alumni ==
- Ben Boyce - TV personality
- Sir Bob Charles ONZ – golfer, first left-handed golfer to win a golf major (The Open Championship, 1963)
- Bill Francis – broadcaster
- Sir Brian Lochore ONZ – rugby union player, All Black player (1964–71), captain (1966–70), coach (1985–87). Also has served as chairperson of Wairarapa College's Board of Trustees.
- Esther Lanser – cricketer, member of the Netherlands national cricket team
- Celia Manson – writer and journalist
- Ian Prior – doctor and epidemiologist
- Ross Taylor – cricketer, member of Black Caps (2006–2022) (also attended Palmerston North Boys' High School)
- Stu Wilson – rugby player, member of the New Zealand national rugby team
