= Ōpaki =

Rural locality in Wellington Region, New Zealand

- Locality
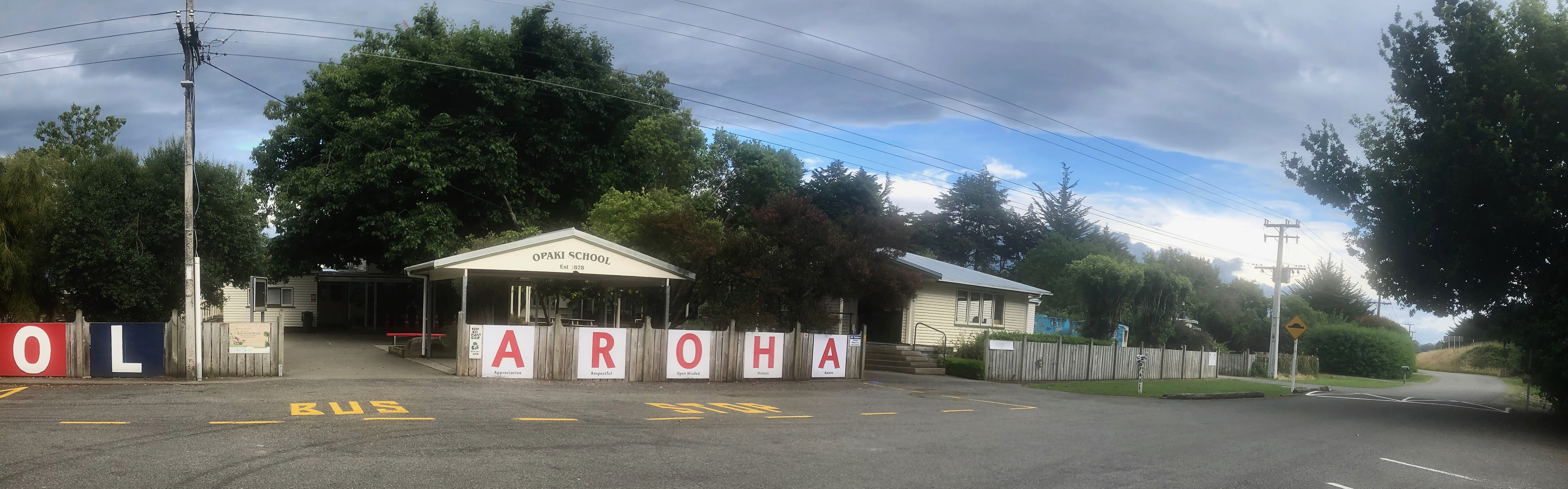
- Ōpaki school
- Interactive map of Ōpaki
- Coordinates: 40.893°S 175.661°E
- Country: New Zealand
- Region: Wellington Region
- Territorial authority: Masterton District
- Ward: Masterton/Whakaoriori General Ward; Masterton/Whakaoriori Māori Ward
- Electorates: Wairarapa; Ikaroa-Rāwhiti (Māori)

Government
  - Territorial Authority: Masterton District Council
  - Regional council: Greater Wellington Regional Council
  - Mayor of Masterton: Bex Johnson
  - Wairarapa MP: Mike Butterick
  - Ikaroa-Rāwhiti MP: Cushla Tangaere-Manuel

Area
  - Total: 35.62 km^{2} (13.75 sq mi)

Population (June 2025)
  - Total: 1,160
  - Density: 32.6/km^{2} (84.3/sq mi)

Ōpaki is a small rural settlement in the Masterton District and Wellington Region of New Zealand's North Island.

Opaki railway station is located at Ōpaki. The centre of the village was bypassed in 1938, when a bridge replaced the railway level crossing, on what is now SH2.

== Demographics ==
Ōpaki statistical area covers 35.62 km^{2} (13.75 sq mi). It had an estimated population of 1,160 as of June 2025, with a population density of 33 people per km^{2}.

Historical population
Year	Pop.	±% p.a.
2006	852	—
2013	957	+1.67%
2018	1,062	+2.10%
2023	1,146	+1.53%
The 2006 population is for a larger area of 36.04 km^{2}. Source:

Opaki had a population of 1,146 in the 2023 New Zealand census, an increase of 84 people (7.9%) since the 2018 census, and an increase of 189 people (19.7%) since the 2013 census. There were 588 males, 549 females, and 6 people of other genders in 429 dwellings. 1.8% of people identified as LGBTIQ+. The median age was 50.3 years (compared with 38.1 years nationally). There were 204 people (17.8%) aged under 15 years, 138 (12.0%) aged 15 to 29, 507 (44.2%) aged 30 to 64, and 294 (25.7%) aged 65 or older.

People could identify as more than one ethnicity. The results were 95.5% European (Pākehā); 9.9% Māori; 1.3% Pasifika; 1.0% Asian; 0.8% Middle Eastern, Latin American and African New Zealanders (MELAA); and 3.1% other, which includes people giving their ethnicity as "New Zealander". English was spoken by 98.7%, Māori by 1.8%, Samoan by 0.5%, and other languages by 5.5%. No language could be spoken by 1.0% (e.g. too young to talk). New Zealand Sign Language was known by 0.8%. The percentage of people born overseas was 17.3, compared with 28.8% nationally.

Religious affiliations were 35.1% Christian, 0.3% Hindu, 0.3% Islam, 0.5% Buddhist, 0.3% New Age, and 0.8% other religions. People who answered that they had no religion were 54.5%, and 8.1% of people did not answer the census question.

Of those at least 15 years old, 234 (24.8%) people had a bachelor's or higher degree, 534 (56.7%) had a post-high school certificate or diploma, and 174 (18.5%) people exclusively held high school qualifications. The median income was $48,400, compared with $41,500 nationally. 168 people (17.8%) earned over $100,000 compared to 12.1% nationally. The employment status of those at least 15 was 471 (50.0%) full-time, 168 (17.8%) part-time, and 9 (1.0%) unemployed.

== Education ==
Ōpaki School is a co-educational state primary school for Year 1 to 8 students, with a roll of 175 as of July 2026. School buses serve the neighbouring settlements of Rangitumau, Mauriceville and Mikimiki. It opened in 1878.
