= Wainuioru =

- Locality
- Interactive map of Wainuioru
- Coordinates: 41.037°S 175.810°E
- Country: New Zealand
- Region: Wellington Region
- Territorial authority: Masterton District
- Electorates: Wairarapa; Ikaroa-Rāwhiti (Māori)

Government
  - Territorial Authority: Masterton District Council
  - Regional council: Greater Wellington Regional Council
  - Mayor of Masterton: Bex Johnson
  - Wairarapa MP: Mike Butterick
  - Ikaroa-Rāwhiti MP: Cushla Tangaere-Manuel

Area
  - Total: 298.42 km^{2} (115.22 sq mi)

Population (2023 census)
  - Total: 252
  - Density: 0.844/km^{2} (2.19/sq mi)

Wainuioru is small rural settlement in Wellington Region, New Zealand, just east of Masterton and north of Wainuioru River.

The settlement has a town hall and volunteer fire station.

The settlement has two heritage sites:

- Brancepeth is a colonial homestead and garden, still owned by the Beetham family who settled on the land in 1856. By 1900 Brancepeth was one of the largest sheep stations in New Zealand. At its height, it included an on-site library and school and more than 300 staff.
- Te Parae Homestead was designed and built in 1905 by Guy and Eileen Williams, the homestead is now owned and run by their great granddaughter Angela Irving. The property has remained in the Williams family since it began in 1857 and plays an important role in the history of the Wairarapa. Te Parae was originally part of the Beetham owned Brancepeth Station with farmland totalling 70,000 acres.

== Demographics ==
Wainuioru locality covers 298.42 km^{2} (115.22 sq mi). It is part of the Whareama statistical area.

Historical population
Year	Pop.	±% p.a.
2006	240	—
2013	249	+0.53%
2018	273	+1.86%
2023	252	−1.59%

Wainuioru had a population of 252 in the 2023 New Zealand census, a decrease of 21 people (−7.7%) since the 2018 census, and an increase of 3 people (1.2%) since the 2013 census. There were 135 males and 114 females in 102 dwellings. 3.6% of people identified as LGBTIQ+. There were 45 people (17.9%) aged under 15 years, 45 (17.9%) aged 15 to 29, 126 (50.0%) aged 30 to 64, and 33 (13.1%) aged 65 or older.

People could identify as more than one ethnicity. The results were 95.2% European (Pākehā); 15.5% Māori; 2.4% Pasifika; 1.2% Asian; 1.2% Middle Eastern, Latin American and African New Zealanders (MELAA); and 2.4% other, which includes people giving their ethnicity as "New Zealander". English was spoken by 98.8%, Māori by 1.2%, and other languages by 3.6%. No language could be spoken by 1.2% (e.g. too young to talk). New Zealand Sign Language was known by 1.2%. The percentage of people born overseas was 7.1, compared with 28.8% nationally.

Religious affiliations were 20.2% Christian, and 1.2% Buddhist. People who answered that they had no religion were 70.2%, and 7.1% of people did not answer the census question.

Of those at least 15 years old, 39 (18.8%) people had a bachelor's or higher degree, 135 (65.2%) had a post-high school certificate or diploma, and 30 (14.5%) people exclusively held high school qualifications. 15 people (7.2%) earned over $100,000 compared to 12.1% nationally. The employment status of those at least 15 was 120 (58.0%) full-time, 42 (20.3%) part-time, and 3 (1.4%) unemployed.

== Education ==
Wainuioru School is a co-educational state primary school for Year 1 to 8 students, with a roll of 85 as of July 2026. It opened in 1959, with a merger of Poroporo (opened 1915), Ngaumu Road (opened 1923) and Fernyhurst Road (opened 1950) schools. Ngahape School (opened 1930 to 1945, reopened 1954) merged to Wainuioru School about 1966.

Most students come from the surrounding rural area, but many come from Masterton.

== Climate ==
Climate data for Ngaumu Forest (1981–2010)
Month	Jan	Feb	Mar	Apr	May	Jun	Jul	Aug	Sep	Oct	Nov	Dec	Year
Mean daily maximum °C (°F)	23.1 (73.6)	23.2 (73.8)	21.3 (70.3)	18.0 (64.4)	14.9 (58.8)	12.1 (53.8)	11.3 (52.3)	12.4 (54.3)	14.9 (58.8)	16.9 (62.4)	18.7 (65.7)	21.0 (69.8)	17.3 (63.2)
Daily mean °C (°F)	16.9 (62.4)	17.0 (62.6)	15.3 (59.5)	12.3 (54.1)	9.9 (49.8)	7.8 (46.0)	7.0 (44.6)	7.8 (46.0)	9.7 (49.5)	11.5 (52.7)	13.1 (55.6)	15.3 (59.5)	12.0 (53.5)
Mean daily minimum °C (°F)	10.7 (51.3)	10.8 (51.4)	9.4 (48.9)	6.7 (44.1)	5.0 (41.0)	3.5 (38.3)	2.7 (36.9)	3.2 (37.8)	4.6 (40.3)	6.1 (43.0)	7.5 (45.5)	9.6 (49.3)	6.7 (44.0)
Average rainfall mm (inches)	28.3 (1.11)	76.8 (3.02)	106.8 (4.20)	77.4 (3.05)	128.6 (5.06)	139.9 (5.51)	131.0 (5.16)	123.0 (4.84)	108.2 (4.26)	58.1 (2.29)	70.2 (2.76)	38.8 (1.53)	1,087.1 (42.79)
Source: NIWA
