= Fernridge, New Zealand =

Rural locality in Wellington Region, New Zealand

Fernridge
- Locality
- Interactive map of Fernridge
- Coordinates: 40.9337°S 175.6142°E
- Country: New Zealand
- Region: Wellington Region
- Territorial authority: Masterton District
- Ward: Masterton/Whakaoriori General Ward; Masterton/Whakaoriori Māori Ward
- Electorates: Wairarapa; Ikaroa-Rāwhiti (Māori)

Government
  - Territorial Authority: Masterton District Council
  - Regional council: Greater Wellington Regional Council
  - Mayor of Masterton: Bex Johnson
  - Wairarapa MP: Mike Butterick
  - Ikaroa-Rāwhiti MP: Cushla Tangaere-Manuel

Area
  - Total: 84.91 km^{2} (32.78 sq mi)

Population (June 2025)
  - Total: 1,300
  - Density: 15/km^{2} (40/sq mi)

Fernridge is a small rural settlement located 4 km northwest of Masterton, New Zealand. The area has a mixture of farms, horticultural smallholdings and lifestyle blocks.

== Demographics ==
Upper Plain statistical area, which also includes Kaituna and Matahiwi, covers 84.91 km^{2} (32.78 sq mi). It had an estimated population of 1,300 as of June 2025, with a population density of 15 people per km^{2}.

Historical population
Year	Pop.	±% p.a.
2006	1,044	—
2013	1,071	+0.37%
2018	1,203	+2.35%
2023	1,263	+0.98%
The 2006 population is for a larger area of 85.23 km^{2}. Source:

Upper Plain had a population of 1,263 in the 2023 New Zealand census, an increase of 60 people (5.0%) since the 2018 census, and an increase of 192 people (17.9%) since the 2013 census. There were 648 males, 609 females, and 6 people of other genders in 441 dwellings. 2.4% of people identified as LGBTIQ+. The median age was 46.3 years (compared with 38.1 years nationally). There were 231 people (18.3%) aged under 15 years, 177 (14.0%) aged 15 to 29, 591 (46.8%) aged 30 to 64, and 261 (20.7%) aged 65 or older.

People could identify as more than one ethnicity. The results were 92.6% European (Pākehā); 15.9% Māori; 2.9% Pasifika; 2.4% Asian; 0.2% Middle Eastern, Latin American and African New Zealanders (MELAA); and 3.3% other, which includes people giving their ethnicity as "New Zealander". English was spoken by 97.9%, Māori by 2.6%, Samoan by 0.5%, and other languages by 5.5%. No language could be spoken by 1.9% (e.g. too young to talk). New Zealand Sign Language was known by 0.7%. The percentage of people born overseas was 13.3, compared with 28.8% nationally.

Religious affiliations were 29.7% Christian, 0.2% Hindu, 0.2% Māori religious beliefs, 0.5% Buddhist, 0.2% New Age, and 0.7% other religions. People who answered that they had no religion were 60.8%, and 7.8% of people did not answer the census question.

Of those at least 15 years old, 252 (24.4%) people had a bachelor's or higher degree, 579 (56.1%) had a post-high school certificate or diploma, and 201 (19.5%) people exclusively held high school qualifications. The median income was $43,000, compared with $41,500 nationally. 150 people (14.5%) earned over $100,000 compared to 12.1% nationally. The employment status of those at least 15 was 525 (50.9%) full-time, 171 (16.6%) part-time, and 15 (1.5%) unemployed.

== Education ==
Fernridge School is a co-educational state primary school for Year 1 to 6 students, with a roll of 204 as of July 2026. It opened in 1866.
