= John Cornes =

John Cornes may refer to:

- Jerry Cornes (John Frederick Cornes, 1910–2001), English middle-distance runner, colonial officer, and schoolmaster
- John Cornes (rugby union) (1947–2014), Australian rugby union player
