= Kuranui College =

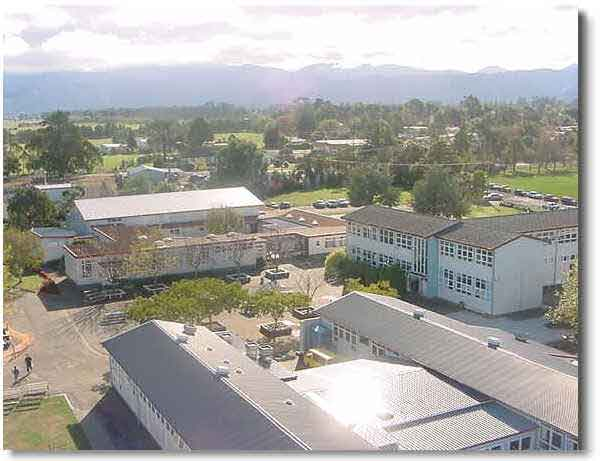
- Aerial view of Kuranui College in 2003

Location
- East Street; Greytown, 5712; New Zealand (Māori: Te Hupenui, 5712 Aotearoa); 41.0916°S 175.4501°E

Information
- Other name: KC
- Type: State co-educational secondary day school
- Motto: Māori: Tātau Tātau (We Are All One)
- Established: 2 February 1960; 66 years ago
- Ministry of Education Institution no.: 249
- Dean: Eleanor Leadbeater (international)
- Principal: Misbah Sadat
- Staff: 100 (2023)
- Years offered: 9–13
- Gender: Coeducational
- Enrolment: 762 ▲ (July 2026)
Colours
Maroon, White & Blue
- Socio-economic decile: 6
- Budget: NZ$6,243,183 million (31 December 2021)
- Website: kuranuicollege.school.nz

Kuranui College is a state co-educational secondary day school for the South Wairarapa located in Greytown, New Zealand. The college opened in February 1960 to replace the four district high schools in Greytown, Featherston, Martinborough, and Carterton. The college was built in Greytown, for it was the midpoint of the towns. In the midst of the post-World War II baby boom. It has been said to have as many as 900 students in the mid-1970s, but since the end of the baby boom, that number has dropped.

Then Education Minister Lockwood Smith disbanded the college's Board of Trustees due to it being dysfunctional. Brian Lochore was appointed commissioner after sacking of the board of trustees in 1994. Board in-fighting had reached the stage where the students rebelled, staging a lunchtime student strike. In 2005, Trevor Mallard visited Kuranui College due to the Wairarapa schools project, WELCom. He first announced the project at Kuranui College. The project aims to establish a 'virtual' secondary school community for the Tararua and Wairarapa region using broadband. Kuranui is one of 15 rural secondary schools in New Zealand with agricultural subjects in their curriculum. Kuranui is a busload college with over eighty per cent of the students who go to college travel to and from school daily by bus.

The college serves Years 9 to 13; the college has a roll of 762 students as of July 2026.

== History ==
=== Origins 1950–1959 ===
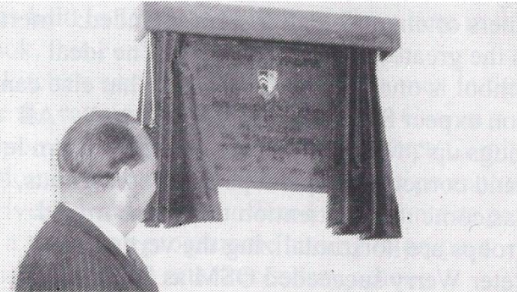
Governor General Lord Cobham opening Kuranui College in October 1961.

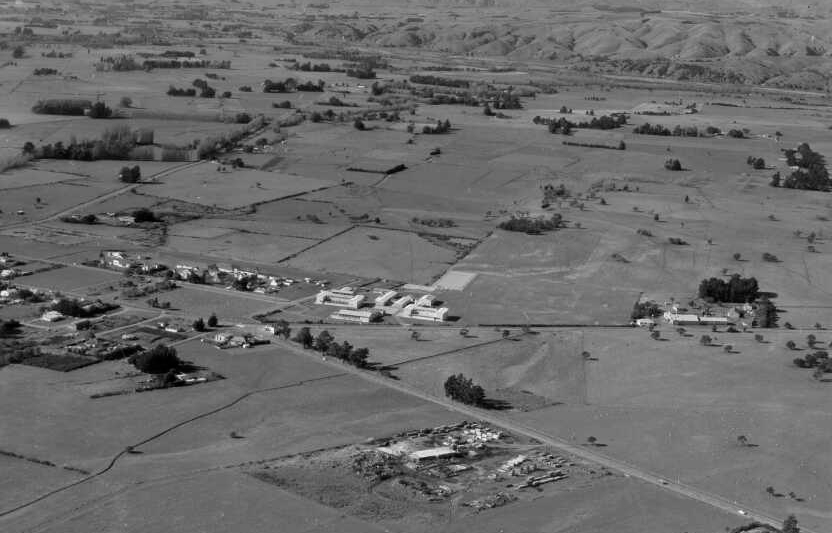
Aerial photograph of Kuranui College 1965.

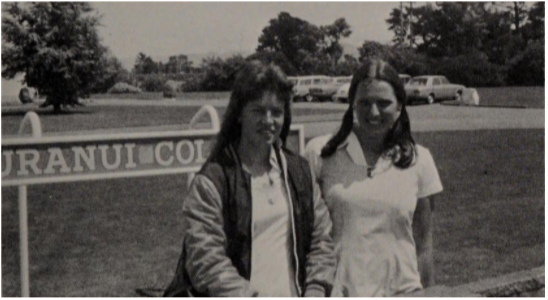
The entrance to the college grounds 1977.

Prior to the establishment of Kuranui, secondary education in the South Wairarapa was catered for by the local district high schools in the four towns. As early as 1950, the Greytown School Committee and Wellington Education Board members were discussing methods of fulfilling this need. In July 1952, a meeting of school committees and parent-teacher associations asked the Wellington Education Board to establish a post-primary school in South Wairarapa. The department proceeded with the request to establish a post-primary school. During the succeeding months, the location of the new college was the subject of much discussion, and though Greytown and Featherston agreed to the disestablishment of the local high schools, In July 1958, the Cabinet Works Committee approved the preparation of plans. By September 1959, Sam Meads had been appointed principal. The name "Kuranui" was selected by the Committee of Management at its inaugural meeting in Greytown District High School on September 19, 1959. Kuranui in the Māori language means "large school" (kura = school, education, learning gathering + nui = to be large, big), describing the aspect it was formed from three former high schools, and also being a secondary school ("bigger" than a primary school.)

=== A new college 1960–1969 ===
On the 1st of February 1960, twenty-two staff met together for the first time. The next day, the whole school assembled in the hospital paddock. When the college was first opened in 1960, it taught children at the primary school level as well as children at the secondary level. The official opening of the college wasn't done until a year later, in 1961, by Lord Cobham, who was Governor-General at the time. In 1962 the drama class did Trial by Jury. The college produced a recording of the play on a 10-inch LP with the label "His Master's Voice Process Recording." The drama class also did the opera Lolanthe in 1966 with the same recording company. This led to a sequence of Gilbert and Sullivan operas in the first few years such as The Gondoliers, The Mikado and The Yeomen of the Guard.

=== Crest ===
The crest represents the Wairarapa. The two white arrows represent the peaks of the mountain ranges. The blue with white zigzags represent Lake Wairarapa with the sun shining on the lake, and below the crest is the school motto, Tatau Tatau.

=== Reunions ===
The first reunion was held in April 1985 for the college's Silver Jubilee. Next was Easter 2000, from April 21–23, for the 40th anniversary. In 2010, the college had its Golden Jubilee over the Easter weekend. Some of the events of the reunion included entertainment from the college's dance group and the kapa haka group. A museum was also set up in the auditorium, where old photos of the college, uniforms, and memorabilia were displayed. A 60th anniversary celebration was held at the college. 113 students out of the original 450 came to the event. At the end of the day, a cherry tree was dug up for the future students of the college to sit under.

=== Controversies ===
In 2009, a year 13 student pleaded guilty to possessing cannabis. He was also giving it out to his flower students in the playground of the college. His family withdrew him from the college.

In 2010, four year 13 Kuranui College students were in a high-speed crash. The car they were driving ended upside-down in a ditch. They were taken to Wairarapa Hospital. All of them survived the cash. Two of the students had severed their spinal cords. The driver of the car was to do 320 hours of community work. The car crashed about 1:40 p.m. on Monday on rural Papawai Road in Greytown. Seven students, in two cars, had left school without permission. The police said they suspected the two cars had been racing.

One of the teachers had a series of complaints that she repeatedly swore during class and called out insults at her students. She taught at Kuranui College for 12 years, between 2004 and 2016. It was reported that she had told a group of students during a session that if they were going to refuse to sing, "you can f**k off back to class." In September 2010, she was reported for occasionally referring to her students as "wankers" or "sluts" (no formal action was taken on that matter). In 2014, she was given her final warning after an angry outburst that saw her tell students to "shut the f**k up." She also was said to have told a Year 9 student classmate that he was "being a dick" to the rest of the class. After the complaints, she was found guilty of serious misconduct and was struck off the register.

In April 2015, a cleaner was found dead on the college grounds. He started working at the college back in 2011. There were no suspicious circumstances involved in the death.

== Sport and cultural activities ==
=== Art ===
A student at the college and her art was featured at Massey University Creative Arts book Exposure in 2012 for her use of contemporary setting and parody of Disney stereotypes.

In 2021, students did an art project to construct outdoor artworks that have been displayed at the front of the college by putting the artworks on the outside walls of the visual art classroom.

=== Dance ===
At the Wellington ASB 2014 Stage Challenge. Kuranui College placed third in the open division and won the Thomas George McCarthy Trust Award of Excellence for Choreography.

The college contemporary dance team placed 3rd in the Dance NZ Made national finals in Palmerston North 2020. This is the second time Kuranui has placed in the top three at the national level since 2016.

The school came in first place in the national stage performance competition Showquest 2021 with a dance based on the Waikeria Prison uprising. This is the first time Kuranui has come away with a national title, having been placed 2nd in the 2019 competition.

=== Drama ===
In 2008, the college was the winner of the student-directed scene for the Wairarapa Sheila Winn Shakespeare Festival.

At the 2019 SGCNZ National Shakespeare Festival Kuranui College sets its take on Richard III at the time of the New Zealand wars. Kuranui came to the festival having had three students in the past five years make it to the Globe in London. They won 4 Awards for the play. At the 2020 SGCNZ National Shakespeare Festival Kuranui College took out four major awards for their 15-minute scene from King John This was the sixth consecutive year that the college has represented Wairarapa, qualifying for the national finals after winning the regional competition.

=== Music ===
In 2016, the senior rock band Simplicity represented the college at the regionals of the Smokefree Rockquest competition, picking up the People's Choice Award. In 2021, Kuranui College students came away with several top music awards at the regional finals of Smokefree Rockquest. Includes first place in the Solo/Duo category, then second place in the Band category and a place at Nationals.

=== Maths ===
Since 2015, students have been to Wairarapa College for the "Matharapa" competitions. Each team of three pupils competes in three phases of competition over two hours. The teams comprise individuals or groups. The college took firsts in the Year 9 and Year 10 levels.

=== Film ===
In 2022, a 40-minute short film called Sons and Heirs was produced on location in the Wairarapa and written, directed, and starred by a group of Kuranui College students. Sons and Heirs was directed by Leon Eldred and Ārana Edmonds. Edmonds served as a producer. Music was composed by Eldred, Michael McCall and Caleb Drinnan. The crew consisted entirely of kuranui students. Edmonds created many of the film's practical effects with more than 30 litres of fake blood. It included cameo appearances from David Seymour, Patrick Gower and Paul Moon who all lent their voices to the film. The film was made with financial support from South Wairarapa District Council and various other community organisations. It had a total budget of NZ$6,400.00 The premiere was held in Masterton on November 5, and about 150 people turned out to view the film. Its gross reached NZ$574.90.

In 2021, a student won best Editor and Best Sound Mix for ONSCREEN. A nationwide short-film challenge for high school students.

=== Sports ===
One of the students at the college earned first place in Rookie of the Year title in 2010. In the nationwide rodeo competitions. The event she won the title in was Barrel racing.

At the Wairarapa inter-collegiate track and field championships held at Makoura College in 2012. Two records were broken. The shot put events provided a record broken, from a student at the college with a put of 12.22m in the junior boy's section and a record in the intermediate boy's triple jump with a distance of 12.40m.

The college's Football team won the 2014 Wairarapa Secondary school division one title. The boys 1st XI Football team won the Wairarapa Secondary School A grand in 2015.

At the 2016 Rosemary O'Brien Cup the Girls 1st XI Hockey team made the finals at the Rosemary O'Brien national hockey tournament in 2016 the game was held at Palmerston North. In the finals, Kuranui played Feilding High School the score was 6 to Feilding and 0 to Kuranui.

Every year, Kuranui and Tararua College have a traditional annual sports exchange. It was started by former Kuranui Principal Grey Tuck and they play for the Bailey Family Trophy. In 2017, 200 students took part in various sports as part of the Tararua College exchanged. Out of the seven sports codes, Kuranui won five of them and got to keep the Bailey Family Trophy. Kuranui also won it in 2018. For the 2019 exchange it was a draw so Kuranui was allowed to retain the trophy for another year. In September 2020, Kuranui won the Trophy after a 3–3 draw. Six Kuranui sports teams travelled to the Pahiatua Sports Complex to compete.

The college Sport Wellington Regional Athletics was held at Newtown Park in 2019. The college competed in the annual event and won the junior boys' triple jump to set a new record. (Note: The record doesn't count as the student is from a Wairarapa School.) At the same event in 2020, the same students came in 2nd.

In 2021, the school hosted the first e-sports exchange in Wairarapa; they played against Wairarapa College. It was a draw.

=== Pranks ===
In 2014, students at the college put a "For Sale – Kuranui College" advertising sign at the school's entrance. The sign invited offers for the college, fooling teachers as well as other students. The sign is a prank, in keeping with the annual tradition of Year-13 students playing jokes on their last day of school before heading off on study leave. However, Kuranui College has imposed stricter policies on end-of-year senior pranks; by 2023, the faculty control the prank committed to limit what students could do. But we were unable to stop a student's unauthorised use of lube on door handles.

== Facilities ==
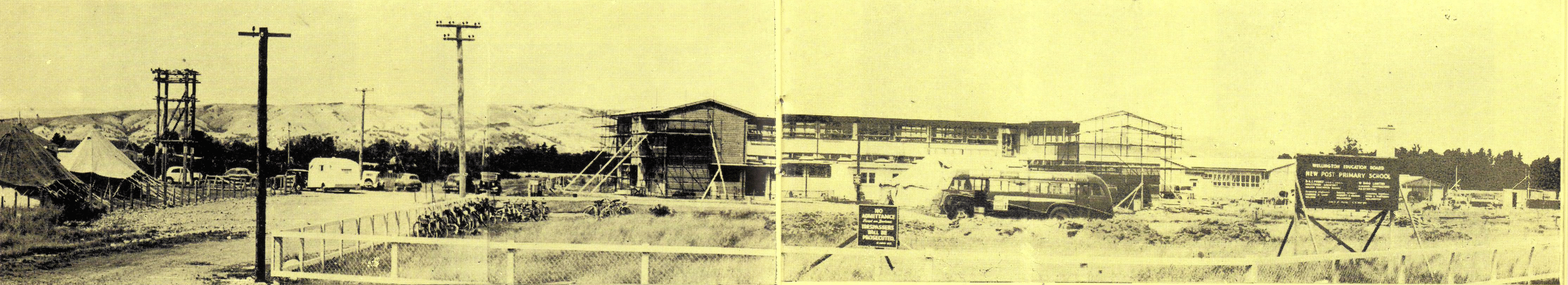
A panoramic view of the front of the college in 1960

=== Map ===
Map of college

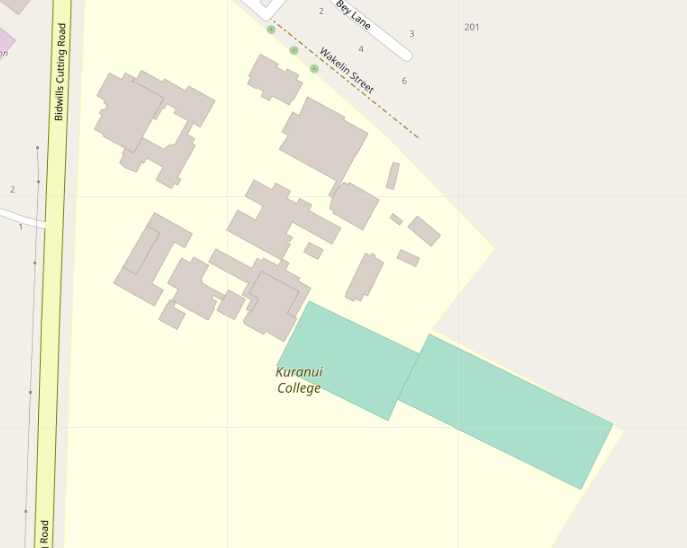
Kuranui College Faculties
Key
– Faculties built in 1960s	– Faculties built in 2000s
– Faculties built in 2010s	– Faculties built in 2020s

=== The Nelson blocks ===
Like many secondary schools in New Zealand of the era, Kuranui was built to the New Zealand standard school buildings, based on two-storey H-shaped "Nelson blocks", of which three were built at Kuranui and only one of them which still stands today, E-Block . C-Block was demolished in 2010, followed by B-Block in 2015, which had stood since 1959.

=== Building new rooms ===
In 2000, the college built a three-quarter turf. New temporary classrooms have been added to the college located on the western and southern sides of Tararua (previously E-Block) and has formed Papawai Block (P-Block). The classrooms at Kuranui College would remain open for up to five years while the ministry plans a permanent block. A new suite of seven science and math classrooms was completed in 2012 as part of a NZ$1.8 million rebuild. More development work, including the demolition of B-Block and the construction of new visual arts classrooms in 2017, was completed.

=== Updating rooms ===
From the day the college was opened until 1970, NZ$19,800 (equivalent to NZ$404,875 in 2026) was spent on the total cost of exterior building maintenance. During 2000, the college completed the upgrading of the college library and staffroom. From 1997 to 2000, the college spent in excess of NZ$500,000 repainting and modernising existing buildings. The school gyms, originally built in 1961, were extended in 1997 with the addition of a classroom, seating area, and climbing area. The school is planning to rebuild the gym, as it is no longer fit for purpose. The total cost of rebuilding is estimated to be upwards of NZ$5.5 million. Piri Weepu supports the plan for the rebuilding the gym. The South Wairarapa District Council has agreed to sign off on a NZ$1 million grant for the gymnasium project. Kuranui College and the Ministry of Education will foot the rest of the approximately NZ$5.5 million bill. There will be a running costs for the facilities themselves and finance costs. The estimated costs are NZ$43,000 for running expenses and NZ$239,000 for finance costs. The loan has a term of over 25 years. In 2009, the college was inline for a NZ$2 million grant from the government to demolish C-Block and update the buildings. A letter was sent to Kuranui School advising them that they had been given the NZ$2 million grant. However, the college had been confused with a primary school of the same name (Kuranui School). The Education Minister at the time, Anne Tolley, had complained that the letter was sent to the wrong school. In 2013, the college spent approximately NZ$7,000 on installing security cameras in part of the college, but doing so throughout the entire college will cost upwards of NZ$40,000. The college library was getting weather-tightness remediation, internal refurbishment, and roof replacement. The work involved the demolition and reconstruction of the library's front entrance, front desk, computer room, and book rooms. Construction for it started in mid-December 2020. Refurbishments were made to T-Block in 2018–2019; work included painting the exterior of the building, replacing internal wall linings, and installing temperature control systems.

All Facilities of Kuranui College
- Gymnasium/Whare Hakinakina
- Te Whare O Maroa
- Student Centre/Te Pokapu Tauira
- Staffroom
- Drama room/Whakaari
- Rugby Field
- Library/Whare Pukapuka
- Visual Art Classroom
- Artificial Turf
- Courts
- Aorangi Block
- Tararua Block
- Wairarapa Block
- Ruamahanga Block
- Papawai Block

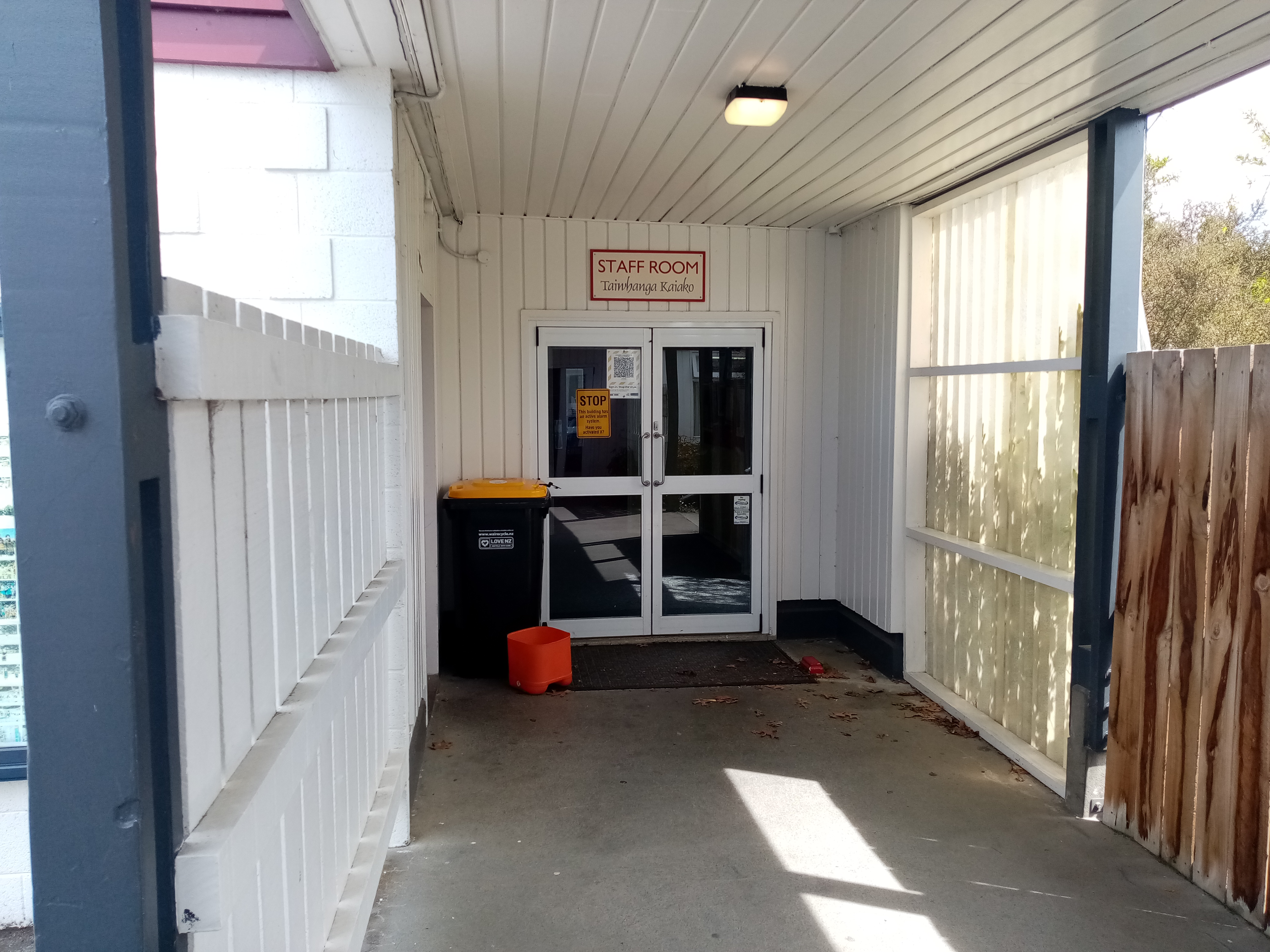
The staffroom for Kuranui College.

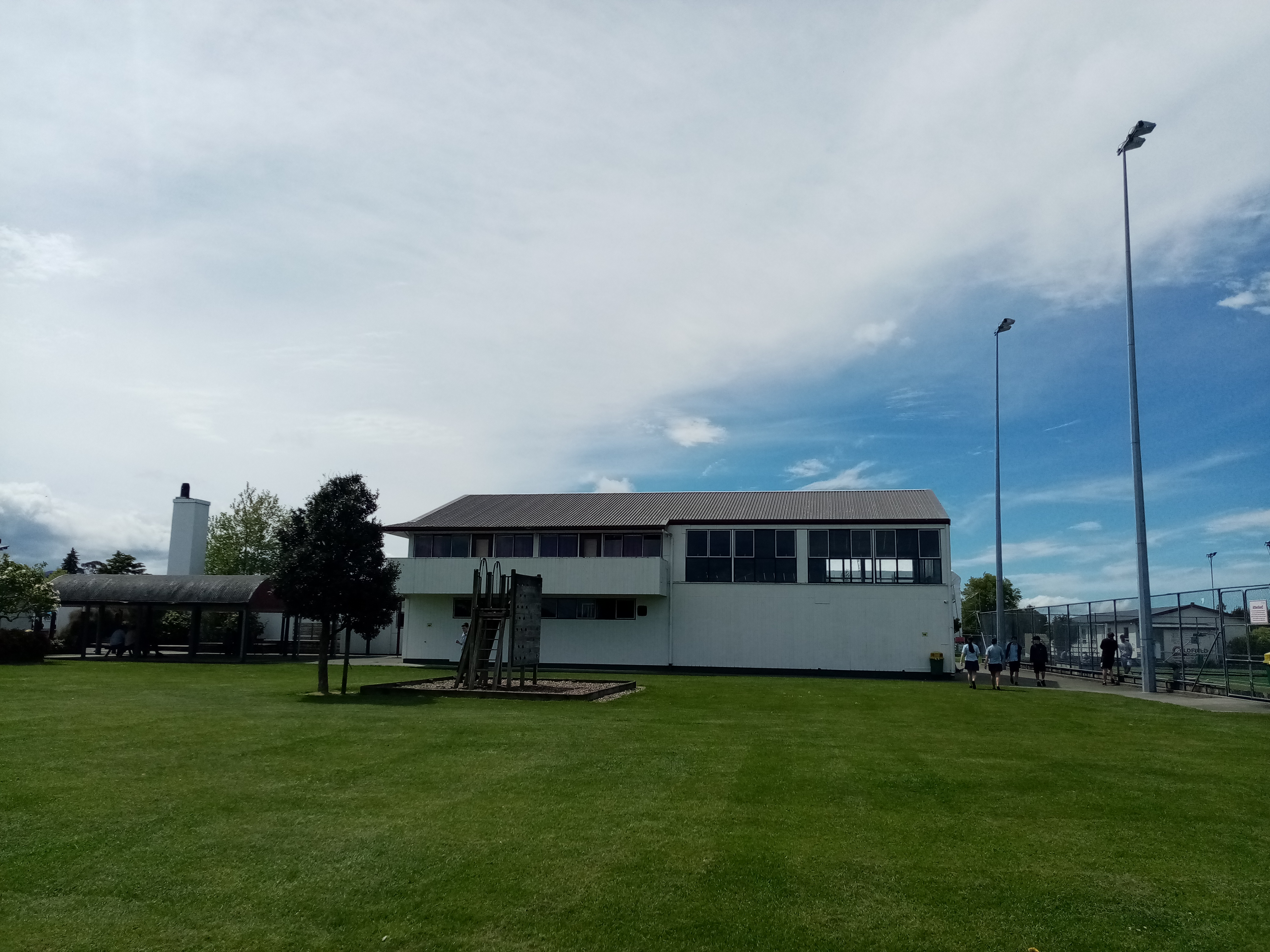
The Kuranui College Gymnasium/Whare Hakinakina.

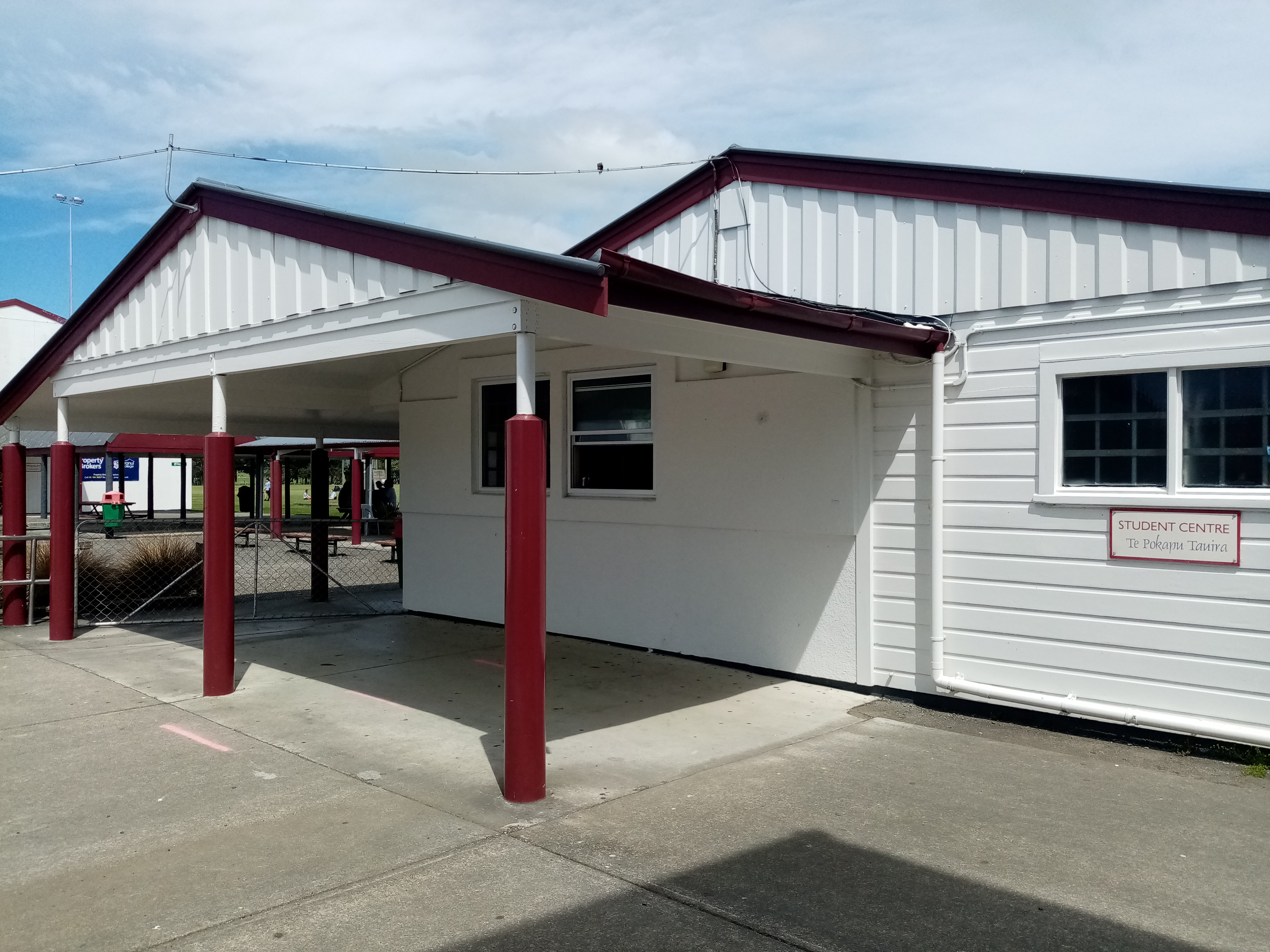
Front of the Student Centre.

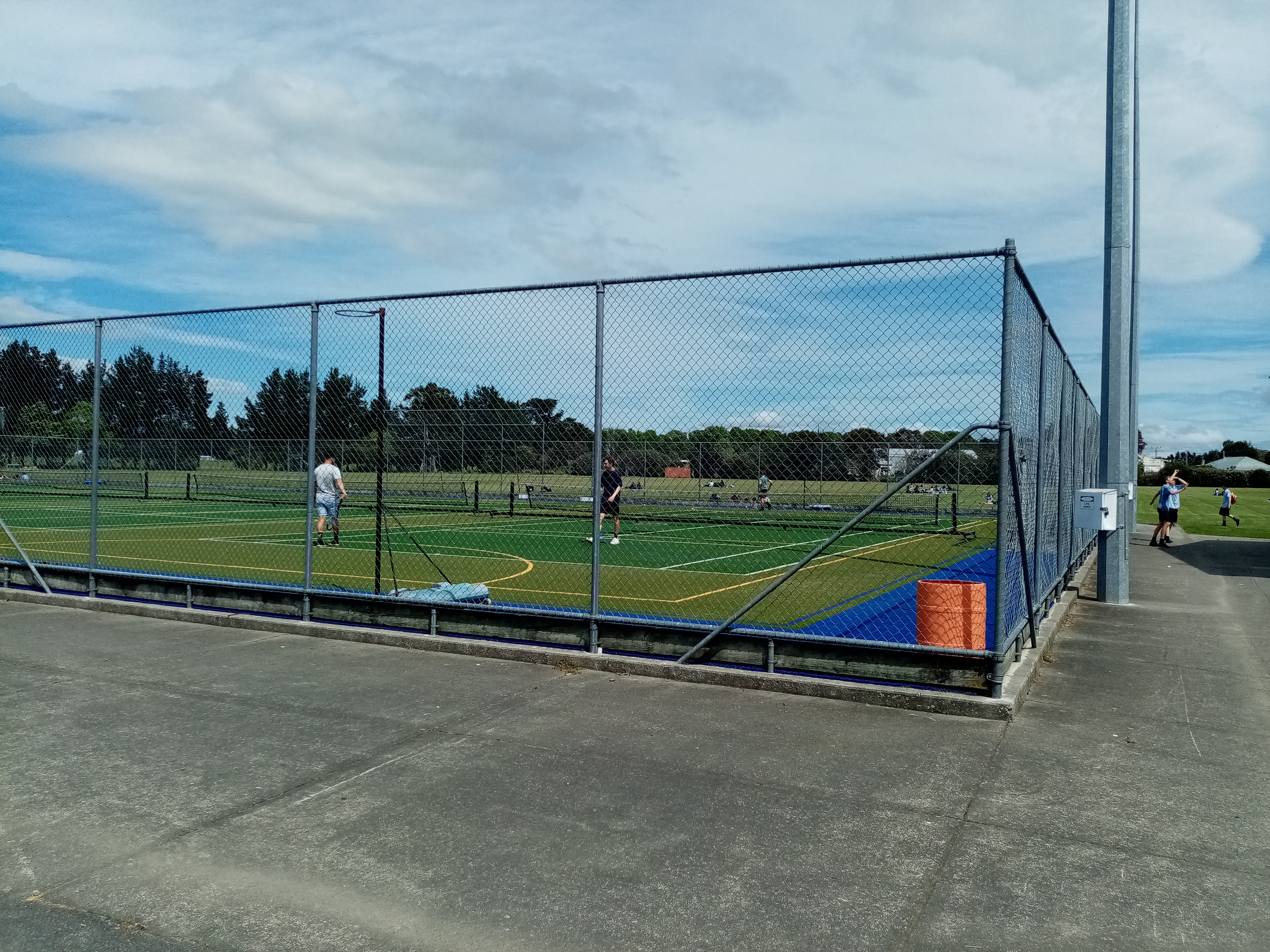
The Artificial Turf.

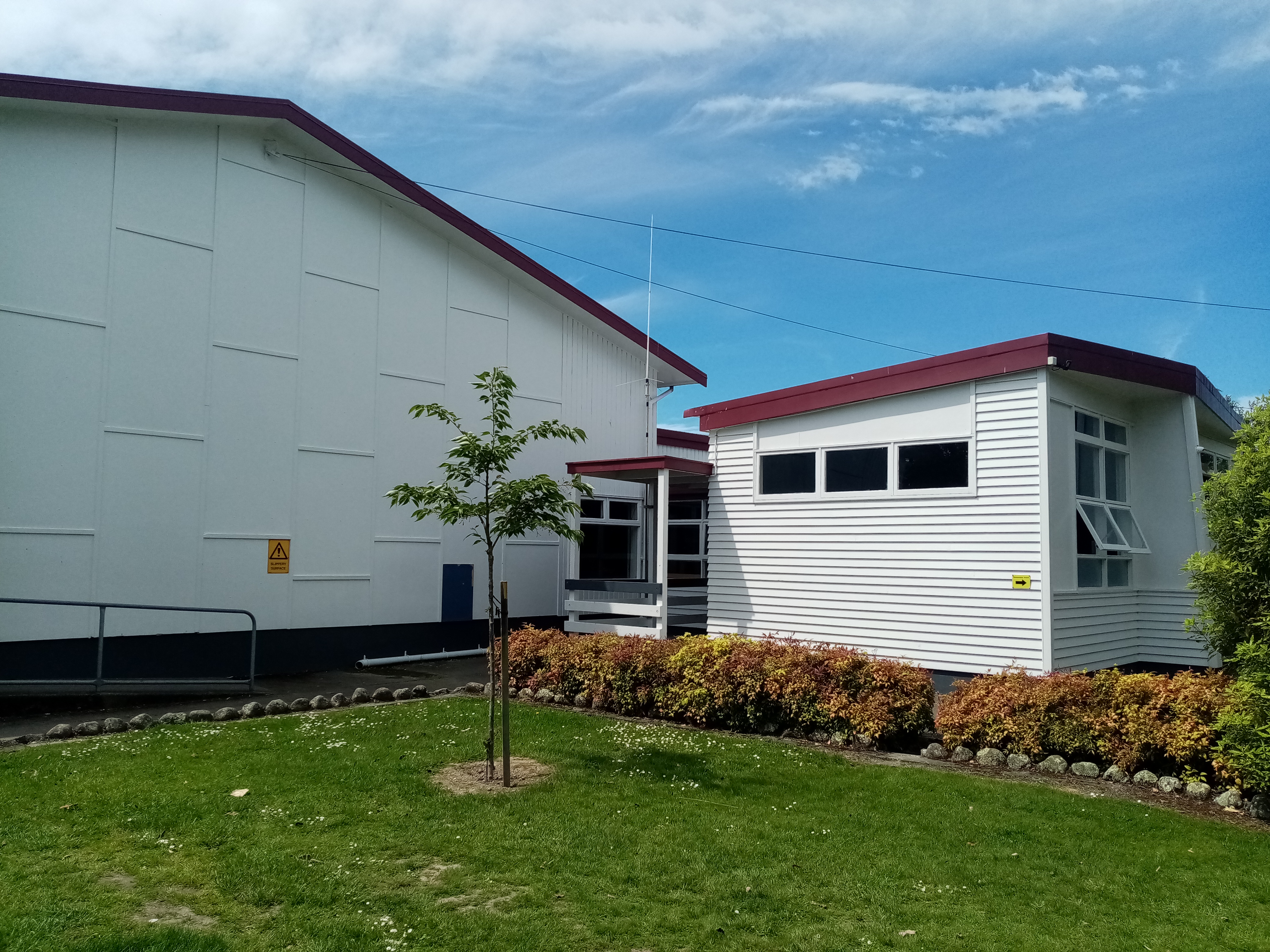
The side of the Drama Room/Whakaari.

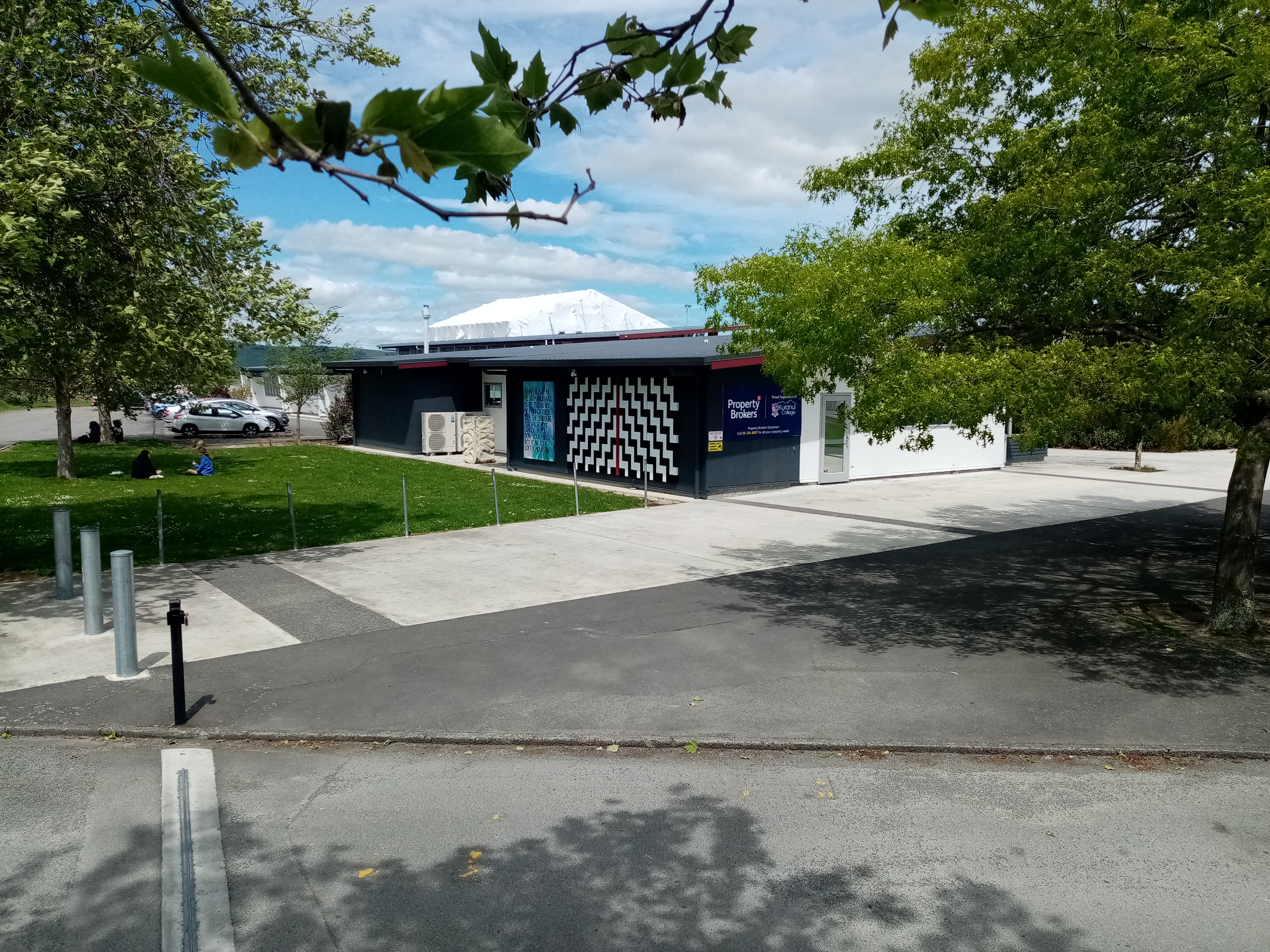
Aorangi Block.

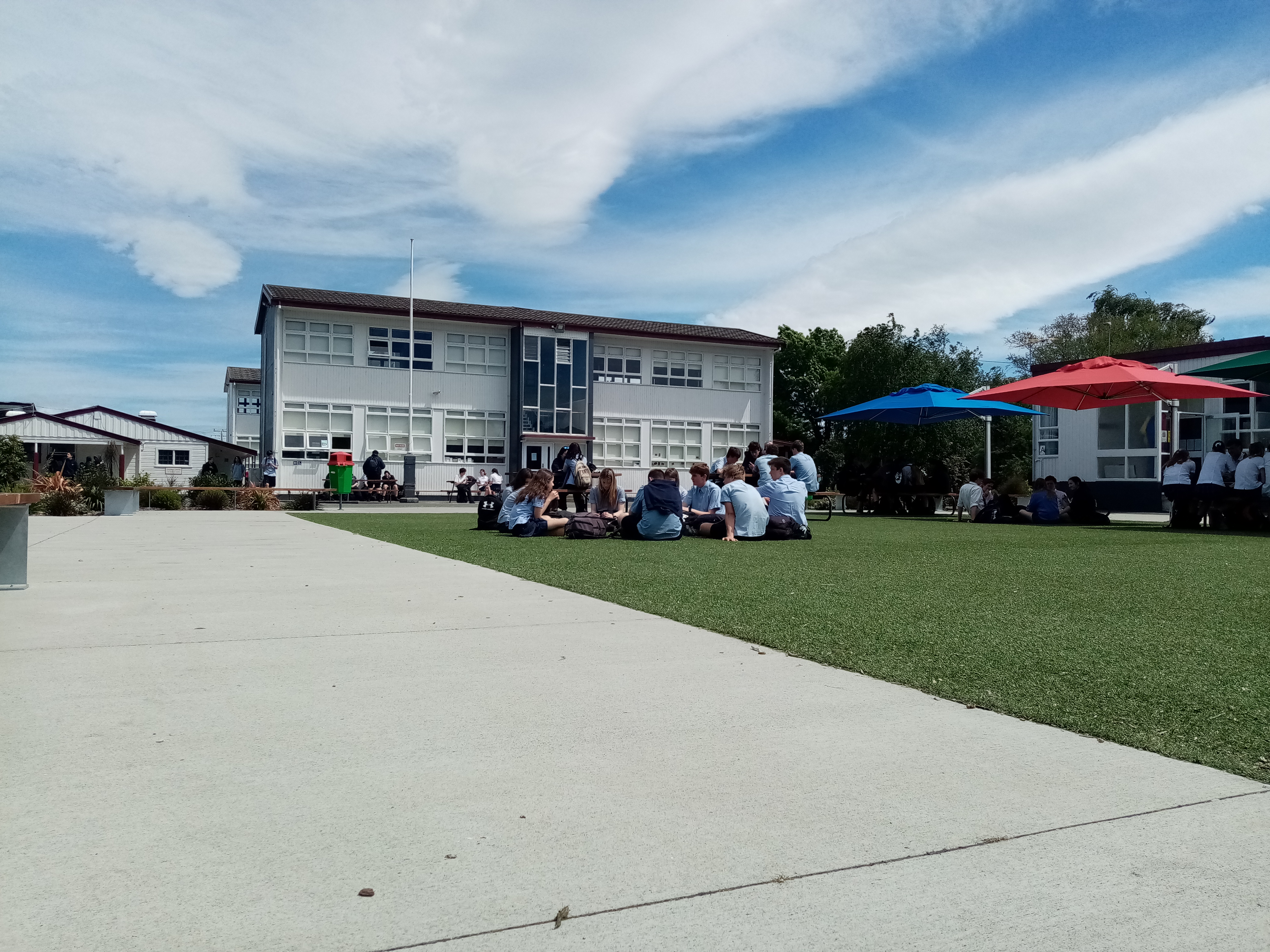
Tararua Block.

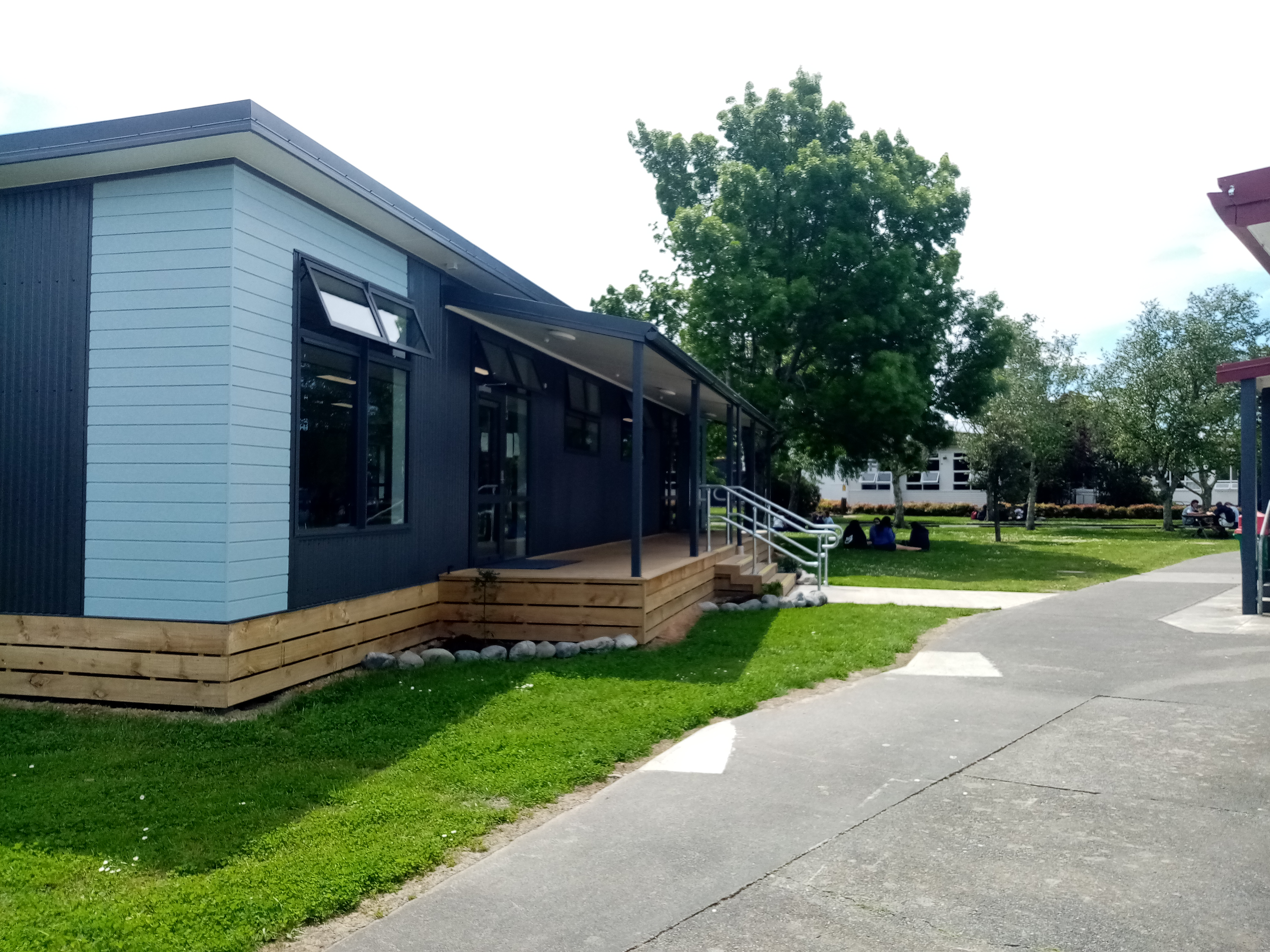
Papawai Block.

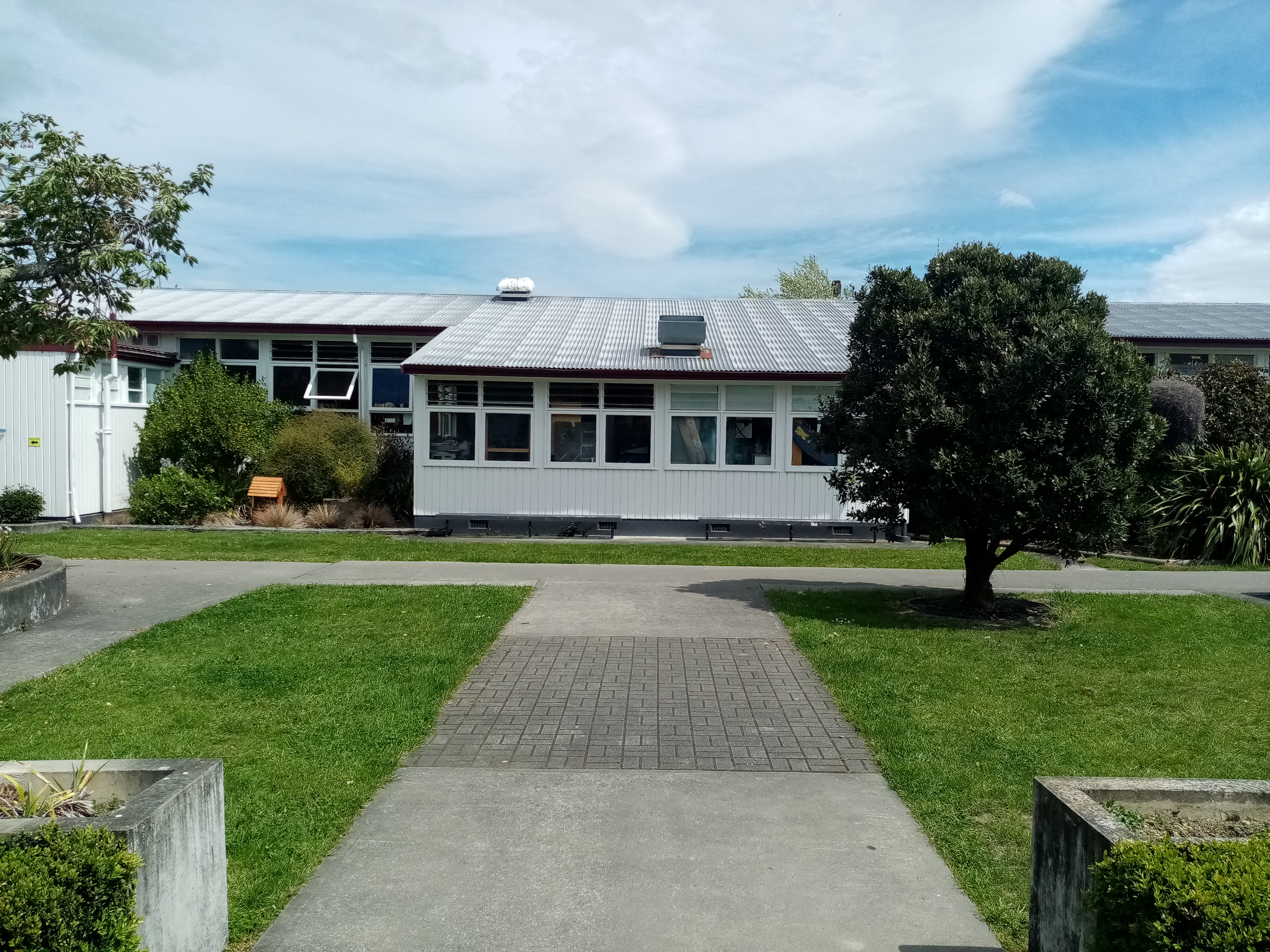
Wairarapa Block.

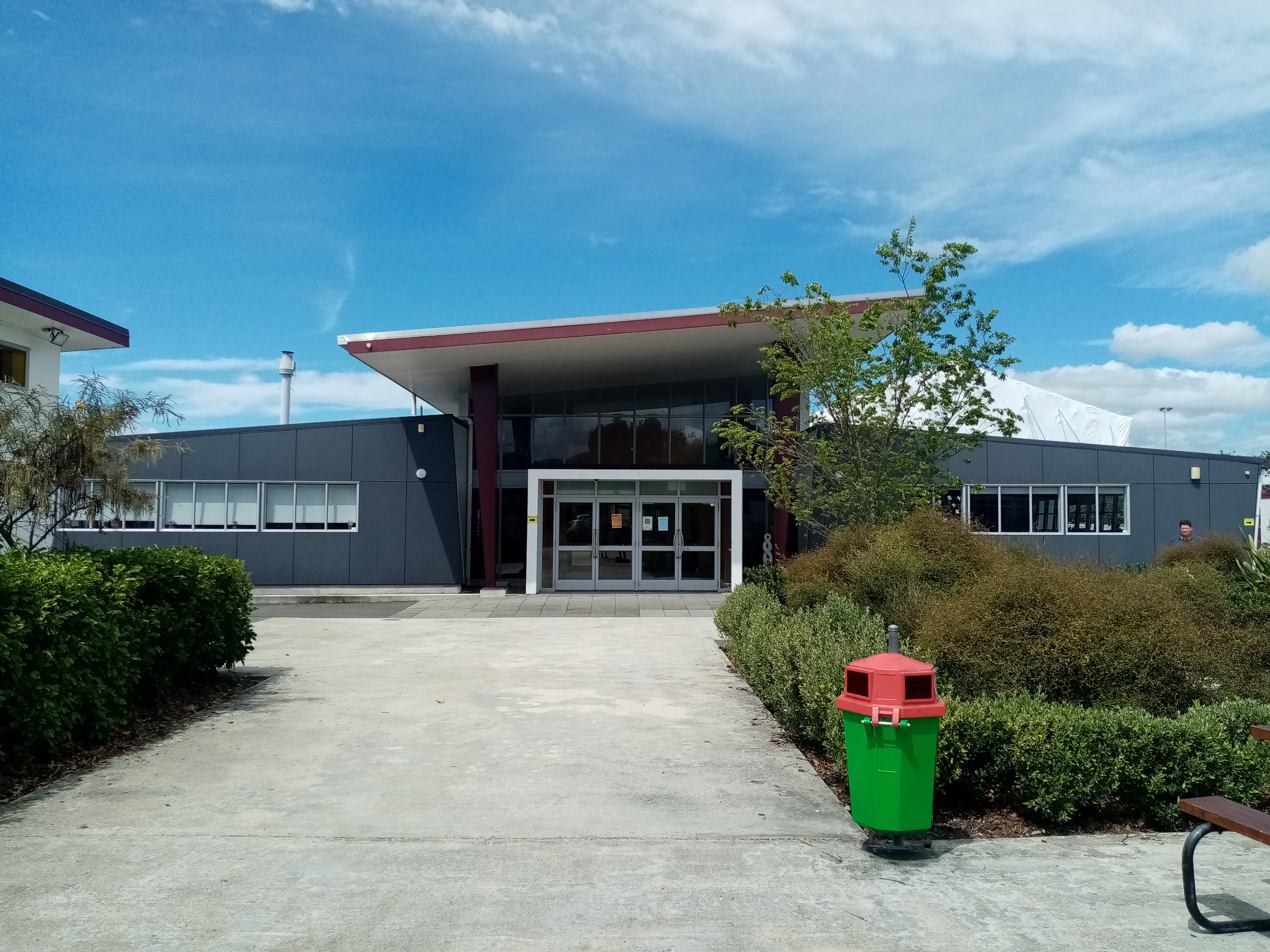
Ruamahanga Block.

== Curriculum ==
=== Base 6 ===
Base 6 was a Kuranui programme back in 2001. The Base 6 project grew out of a process of college self-improvement. The principal, the board of trustees, and the management team decided to focus on elevating student achievement and learning expectations. The Board of Trustees contracted David Hood, an education consultant, as a project facilitator. His primary task at Kuranui was to collaborate with the Board of Trustees, school management, and staff to create an environment where people worked together on common issues. Hood initially spent several weeks talking with staff individually to identify their issues. Asking teachers to talk about their beliefs about learning at Kuranui. This gave Hood a picture of teacher strengths and possible outcomes from the process of staff consultation. College staff were then asked to contribute their thoughts on specific projects that would help the college achieve its goals and objectives, with a focus on enhancing the quality of learning. Eleven project briefs were developed and submitted, along with a plan for classroom upgrades. The change management group believed that many of the proposals should be consolidated under two main new initiatives: one focused on the junior school and the other on the senior school. The junior school project, which eventually grew to be Base 6. The first step for the junior school project team was to develop a mission statement that outlined the goals. In the process of development, the Kuranui College's Change Management Group had determined that the junior school project would be developed around thematic approaches to studying in a home-room setting. The exploration of thematic learning approaches led the project team to consider curriculum integration. The project team's first step was to determine what curriculum integration would mean for them. Both Years 9 and 10 combined national achievement objectives from all curricula, where learning is structured around research and students taking responsibility for their learning. The programme was named after the six main features of Base 6: learning through inquiry, independent student-centred learning, authentic contexts, collaborative learning, ICT-enhanced learning, and the building of family connections. The programme took place for 19 periods per fortnight. The remaining 9 periods were continued to be used for the usual options and programmes. Base 6 students work with the other Year 9 or 10 students during these periods. The students were tasked with collecting and maintaining evidence for a portfolio intended to be stored online. Students who choose not to enter Base 6 are taught in conventional subject classes. It was officially opened on Friday, 23 March 2001. However, in 2018, Kuranui College introduced a curriculum known as Ignite to replace Base 6.

=== Ignite ===
Ignite was implemented at Kuranui in 2018 for junior students (years 9–10) and then for senior students (years 11–13) in 2021. The Ignite programme gives students more choice over their subjects, with each student choosing ten courses (subjects) each year. The courses are split into categories based on the subject they teach, with each course focusing on a particular aspect or passion that students may enjoy. The Ignite programme is meant to increase engagement in the classroom and, therefore, results. The year is divided into two semesters, which are each approximately 18 weeks long. Students study five courses each semester, totalling ten each year. Students have the choice of up to 24 courses over two years before becoming senior students in years 11–13. The senior Ignite students will be able to choose five courses per semester. Students could choose up to 10 courses in a year, or five courses if they took two semesters of each subject. For students completing NCEA L1 the courses they choose must include at least 10 literacy and 10 numeracy credits to complete the year.

=== Inspire time ===
2020 saw the introduction of the new weekly schedule, called Inspire Time, along with a restructured timetable. The programme provided two dedicated weekly sessions in the timetable. Both junior and senior students could select two courses each term. The purpose of Inspire Time was to allow for non-curricular activities focused on pathway development for students. This also allowed for mixed classrooms. Inspire time happened on Tuesday and Thursday During December 2020, Kuranui College received NZ$22,112 for the programme from the Greytown Trust Lands.

== Academics ==
As a state school, Kuranui College is required to follow the New Zealand Curriculum (NZC).

=== Results ===
Qualification 2019	Kuranui Results	National Average Results
NCEA L1	85%	70%
NCEA L2	86%	77%
NCEA L3	70%	67%

== Enrolment ==
Education Counts provided the following statistics as of July 1, 2022: The school had 748 students enrolled, of whom 54.01 percent were male and 45.99 percent were female. There were 476 students identified as European/Pākeha, 214 identified as Māori, 21 as Pacific, 25 as Asian, and 12 as another ethnicity. In 2020, the college recorded its biggest increase in Year 9 student enrolments for over a decade, a 38% increase.

Sex of Students	2022
Male	404 – 54.01%
Female	344 – 45.99%

Student Enrolment History since 1960.

Year	Enrol.	±% p.a.
1960–1961	412	—
1961–1962	544	+32.04%
1962–1963	680	+25.00%
1963–1964	748	+10.00%
1964–1965	784	+4.81%
1965–1966	801	+2.17%
1966–1967	831	+3.75%
1967–1968	862	+3.73%
1968–1969	900	+4.41%

Year	Enrol.	±% p.a.
1985–1986	874	−0.17%
1989–1990	798	−2.25%
1990–1991	684	−14.29%
1991–1992	643	−5.99%
1992–1993	619	−3.73%
1993–1994	573	−7.43%
1994–1995	552	−3.66%
1995–1996	551	−0.18%
1996–1997	565	+2.54%

Year	Enrol.	±% p.a.
1997–1998	549	−2.83%
1999–2000	579	+2.70%
2000–2001	565	−2.42%
2001–2002	551	−2.48%
2002–2003	515	−6.53%
2003–2004	489	−5.05%
2004–2005	484	−1.02%
2005–2006	491	+1.45%
2006–2007	472	−3.87%

Year	Enrol.	±% p.a.
2007–2008	459	−2.75%
2008–2009	467	+1.74%
2009–2010	475	+1.71%
2010–2011	459	−3.37%
2011–2012	507	+10.46%
2012–2013	530	+4.54%
2013–2014	492	−7.17%
2014–2015	503	+2.24%
2015–2016	459	−8.75%

Year	Enrol.	±% p.a.
2016–2017	444	−3.27%
2017–2018	429	−3.38%
2018–2019	470	+9.56%
2019–2020	556	+18.30%
2020–2021	649	+16.73%
2021–2022	771	+18.80%
2022–2023	778	+0.91%
2023–2024	804	+3.34%

Source: 1960–1969, 1985–1986 1989–2010, 2011–2012, 2012–2013, 2013–2018, 2018–2019, 2019–2020 2020–2024

== Houses ==
The school has four houses, which form classes are assigned to, which are named after important places or features of the Wairarapa, and each is represented by a native bird and tree. They are Ruamahanga with the Pūkeko and Hīnau; Aorangi with the Tūī and kowhai; Tararua with the Kererū, and Rātā and Wairarapa with the Toroa and Ngaio. Throughout the year, a series of inter-house sporting and cultural competitions are held that earn points towards top house.

The Kuranui College houses and their colours and eponyms are:

Name of house	Colour	Tree	Bird
Aorangi	Yellow	Kōwhai	Tūī
Ruamahanga	Blue	Hīnau	Pūkeko
Tararua	Red	Rātā	Kererū
Wairarapa	Green	Ngaio	Toroa

== Principals ==
Since its establishment in 1960, Kuranui College has had seven principals. The following is a complete list:

Principals
Portrait	Years	Name	Notes	Refs
	1960–1976	Sam Meads	In 2011, a street in Greytown was named Sam Meads Way, in honour of the foundation principal of the college.	
	1977–1987	Peter Werry	He graduated from the University of Canterbury and Christchurch Teachers Training College.	
	1988–1997	Joye Halford	Joye Halford and the board had decided at its monthly meeting not to have a student representative with voting rights on the board. They would only have speaking rights instead. Students and staff stormed out of class and walked over to the football field and began chanting, 'We want the vote'.	
	1997–1998	Dave McGibbon (acting)	The hockey turf and netball/tennis courts at the college are named after him.	
	1998–2008	R. Grey Tuck	He was the assistant principal at Northland's Bream Bay College.	
	2008–2018	Geoff Shepherd	During his time as principal, he and other members of the college used an unofficial motto of the college: "Be the best that you can be."'	
	2018–2023	Simon Fuller	He studied chemistry at the University of Canterbury.	
	2023-2025	Maree Patten	Served as acting principal for the college for 2018 and then in 2020 and 2023.	
	2025–present	Misbah Sadat	Served as Deputy principal for Onslow College.	

== Notable people ==
=== Students ===
Since it was founded, Kuranui College alumni have made significant and creative contributions to society, the arts, sciences and business. Notable Kuranui College students include:

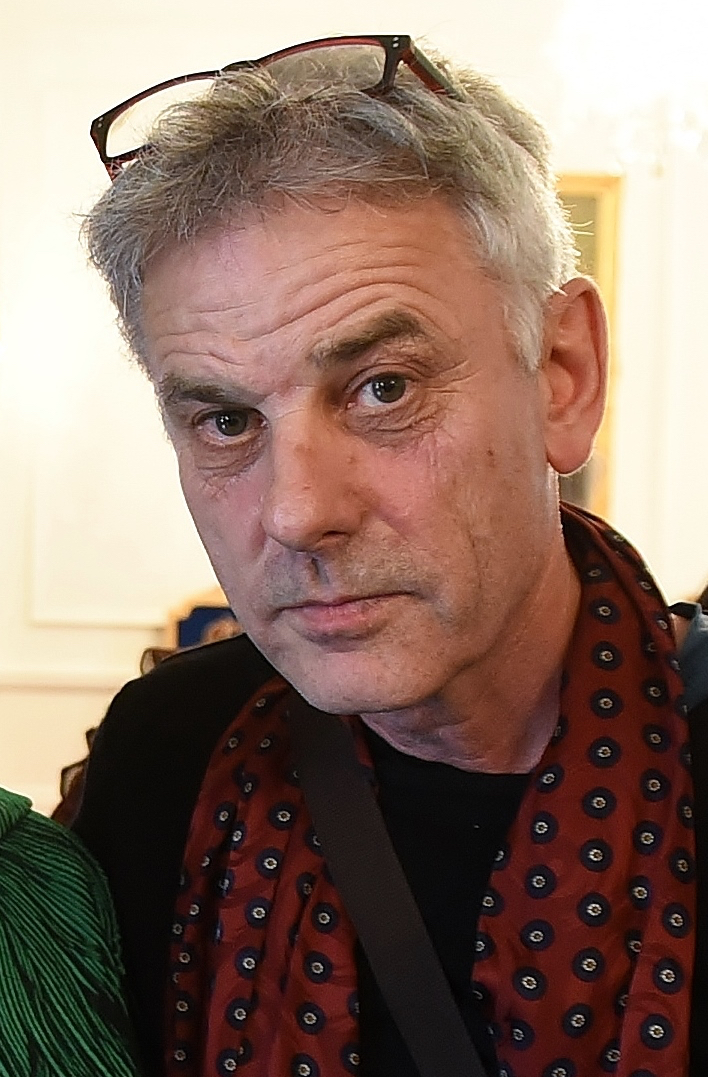
Vincent Ward, Director of What Dreams May Come and writer for Alien³.

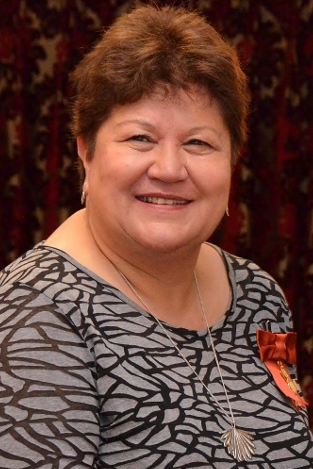
Elizabeth McKinley, Thesis Brown bodies, white coats: postcolonialism, Māori women and science (2003)

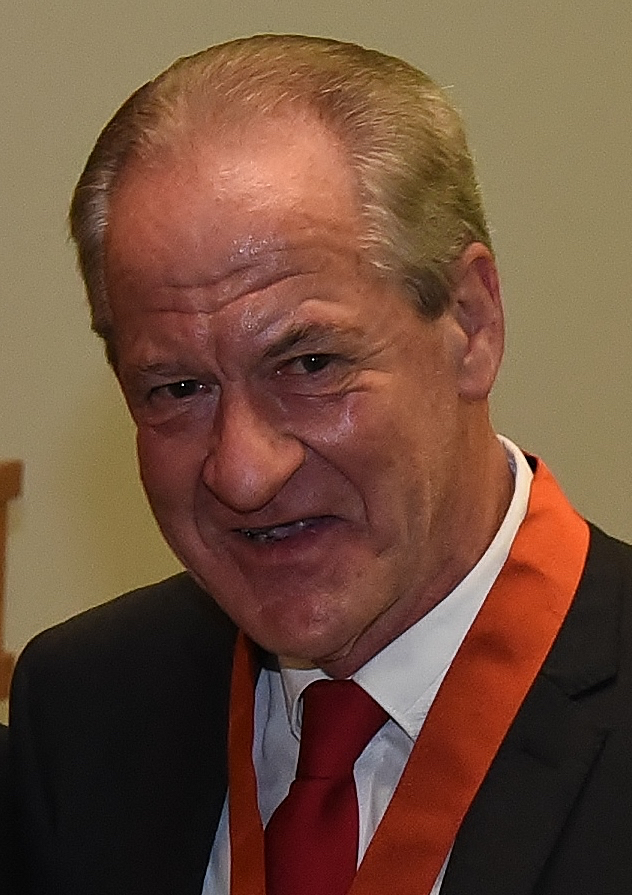
Max Abbott, Was the Vice-Chancellor of Auckland University of Technology.
- Max Abbott – psychologist
- Grant Batty – Former All Blacks player
- Penny Bright – political activist
- Dave Cameron – musician
- John Cornes – rugby union player
- Jimmy Cotter – rugby union player and softballer
- Martin Edmond – writer
- Mike Fabulous – musician
- Bernadette Logue – author
- Elizabeth McKinley – educational theorist
- Vincent Ward – filmmaker

=== Notable staff or members of the board of trustees ===
- Georgina Beyer – politician
- Cathy Casey – politician
- Allan Hunter – rugby union player and teacher
- Tom Hullena – educator
- Belinda Cordwell – tennis player
- Michael Jackson – anthropologist
- Brian Lochore – rugby union player and coach
- Albert Wendt – writer

== See also ==
- Lists of schools in New Zealand
- Education in New Zealand
