= Awatapu College =

Secondary school in Palmestorn North, New Zealand

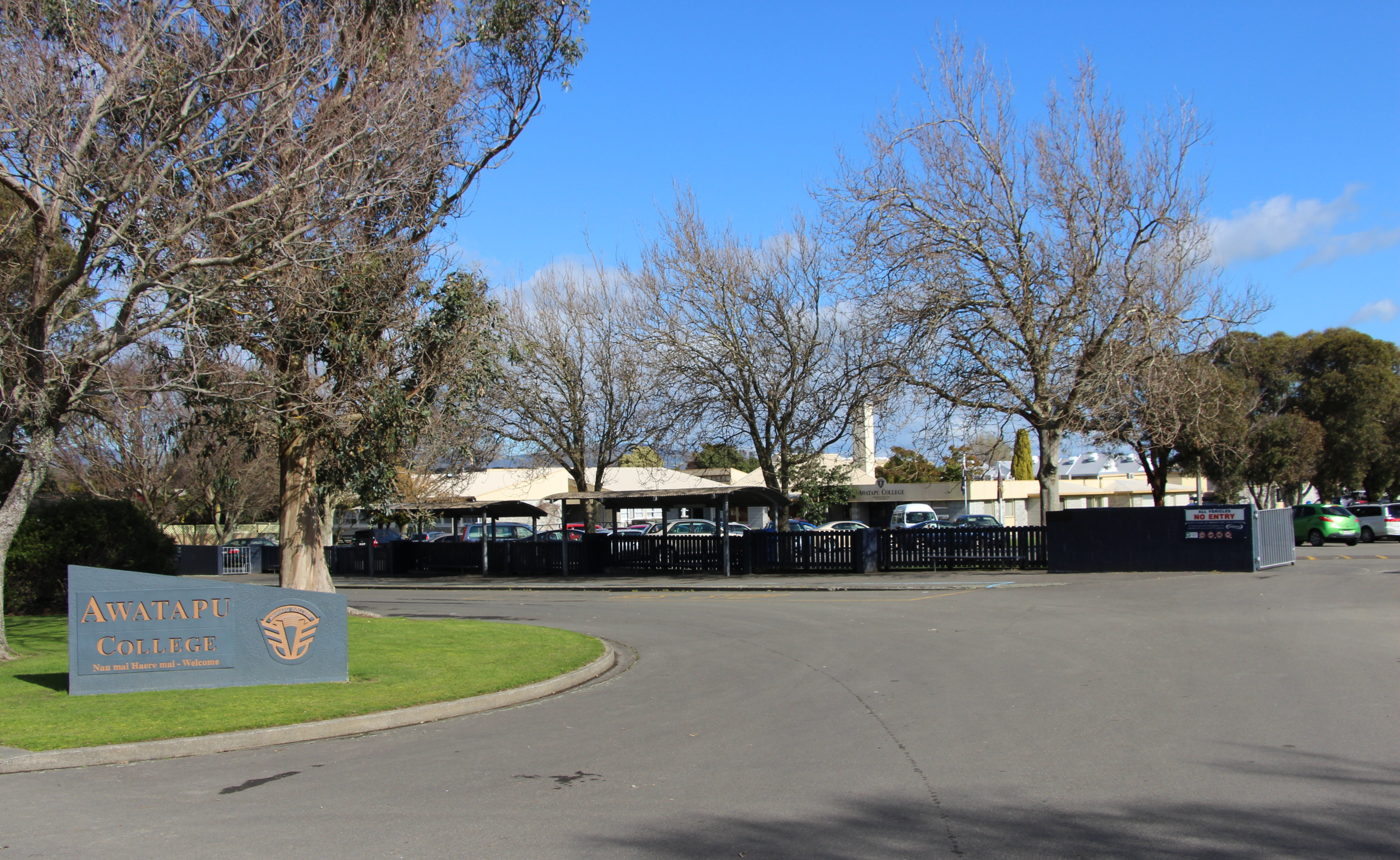
- Awatatpu College main entrance, 2015

Location
- 434 Botanical Rd, Palmerston North; 40.3733°S 175.5999°E

Information
- Type: State co-educational secondary (Year 9–13)
- Motto: Māori: Whai mana, whai oranga (Focused on Excellence)
- Established: 1976
- Ministry of Education Institution no.: 198
- Chairperson: Liz Ward
- Principal: Gary Yeatman
- Enrolment: 870 (July 2026)
- Rival: Freyberg High School
- Socio-economic decile: 4K
- Website: awatapu.school.nz

Awatapu College is a state co-educational secondary school in Awapuni, Palmerston North, New Zealand. It was opened in 1976, and as of July 2026 it has 870 students.

== History ==
Awatapu College opened on 2 February 1976 as Palmerston North's fifth state secondary school, with an initial intake of 244 Form 3 (now Year 9) students. The school added year levels annually as the 1976 Form 3 cohort moved through, opening to all year levels in February 1980. The school was officially opened on 1 December 1976 by Prime Minister Robert Muldoon.

The area known as "Awatapu" started off as an Oxbow lake on the Manawatū River. It later became a lagoon that provided food and shelter to the local Māori of Rangitāne. It also provided food for a variety of birds, pests and eels. The name "Awatapu" was chosen because the school is located on the site of an ancient lagoon. A book about the school's first ten years said: "It was an ancient name which celebrated a forgotten event in the history of the tangata whenua – the Rangitāne people, whose ancestors had for many centuries padded along the bush tracks or splashed up the creek from the river to enjoy the bounty of Awatapu. Unless the name was used it would certainly soon be lost".

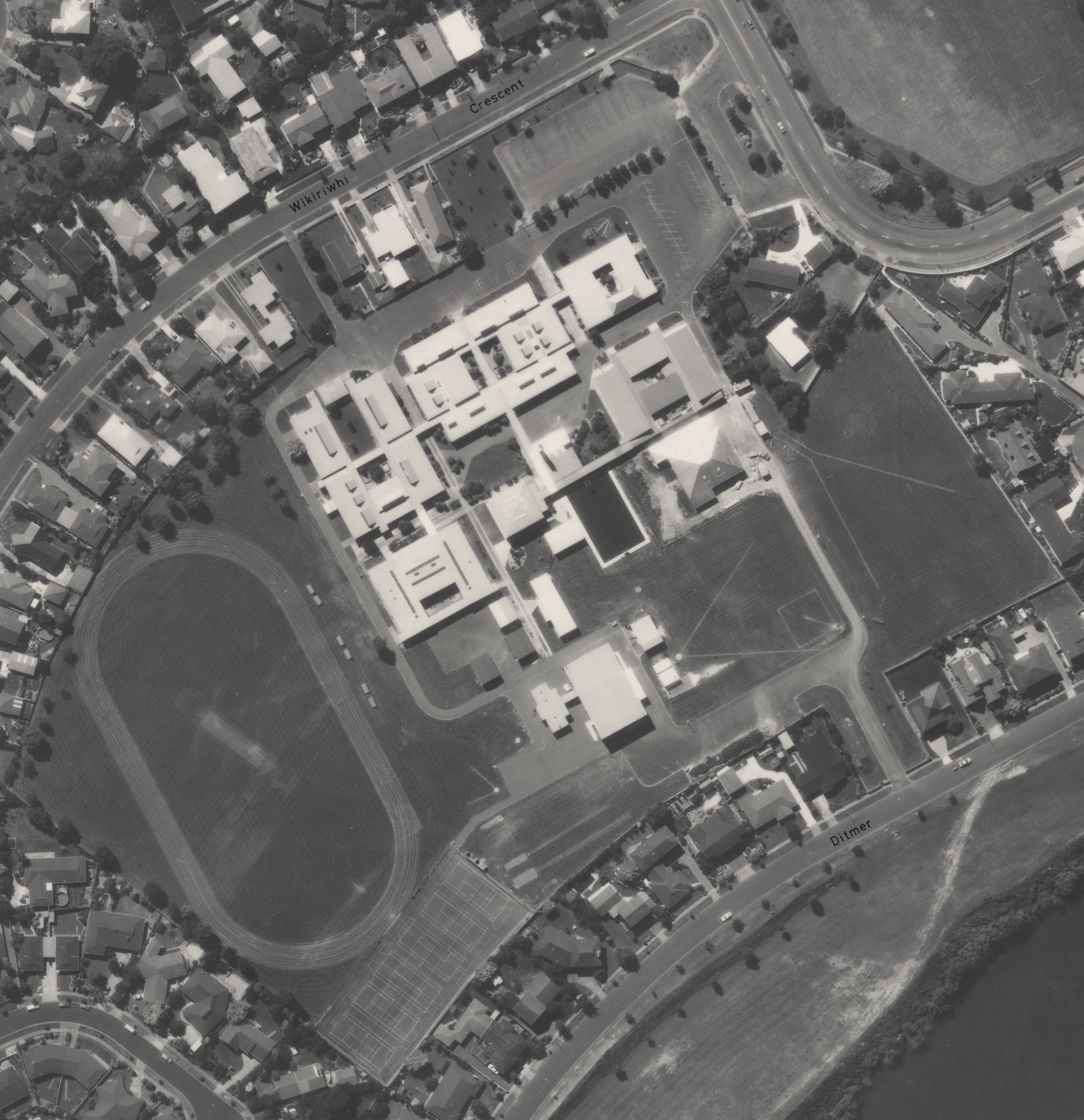
Aerial photo of Awatapu College in March 1986.

Like most New Zealand state secondary schools of the 1970s, Awatapu College was built to the S68 standard plan, characterised by single-storey classroom blocks with concrete block walls, low-pitched roofs, and internal open courtyards. At the time of opening, the only permanent building complete was the first general classroom block (100 block). The arts and crafts block (200 block) opened in May, followed by a half gymnasium in July, and the administration block in September. Major extensions were a second general classroom block (300 block) and the standalone library in 1978, the gymnasium extended to full size in 1979, the senior studies block (600 block) in 1980, and the auditorium in 1986.

=== Principals ===
- John Wall 1976–1989
- Mike O'Connor 1990–1996
- Larry Ching 1996–2002
- Tina Sims 2003–2012
- Gary Yeatman 2013–present

=== Uniform and colours ===
The original 1976 uniform had a chocolate brown and gold colour scheme. Founding principal John Wall had issues selecting school colours that were not in use by other local schools, so the outfitters suggested the colours based on the brown suit and gold waistcoat Wall was wearing at the time. The uniform's distinctive appearance led to the informal nickname "Pineapple Lumps" or "Bumblebees" among students and the wider Palmerston North community.

In 1995, Awatapu College introduced a black and gold uniform, replacing the previous colours, aligning with a more contemporary and neutral aesthetic. The black and gold uniform remains in use today.

== Enrolment ==
As of July 2026, Awatapu College has a roll of 870 students, of which 285 (32.8%) identify as Māori.

As of 2026, the school has an Equity Index of 492, placing it amongst schools whose students have above average socioeconomic barriers to achievement (roughly equivalent to decile 4 under the former socio-economic decile system).

== Academics ==
Awatapu College follows the New Zealand Curriculum. In Years 11 to 13, students complete the National Certificate of Educational Achievement (NCEA), the main secondary school qualification in New Zealand.

In 2024, 75.6% of students leaving Awatapu College attained at least NCEA Level 1, 62.9% attained at least NCEA Level 2, and 39.5% attained at least NCEA Level 3. For schools in the same equity index band, the attainment rates were 83.4%, 72.9%, and 47.8% respectively.

== Structure ==
=== Houses ===
Each student at Awatapu College is assigned a house. Since 2011, each house is named after a famous New Zealand person.

Each house has two student leaders (Year 13 students).

House Names and Colours
Hillary	Named after Sir Edmund Hillary.
Rutherford	Named after Sir Ernest Rutherford.
Sheppard	Named after Kate Sheppard.
Ngata	Named after Sir Āpirana Ngata.

Throughout the year, there are various competitions between the Houses called "House Competitions", additional to the annual Swimming Sports, Athletics Sports and Cross-Country. Previously, each house was named after their colours in Te Reo Māori: Kikorangi, Whero, Kowhai and Kakariki, respectively.

=== Annual Events and Publications ===
==== School Magazine ====
The School Magazine, or "Yearbook" is given to students at the end of each year, usually on the senior sign out day. Students receive a copy of the magazine for free if they have paid the activity donation in their school fees, or can buy one for just $15. Early on, the magazine was titled "CHRYSALIS", referring to the transition of students from adolescence to more mature adults.

Throughout the year, a committee of Year 13 students and teachers organise the content, design and publishing of the magazine. Usually, the cover of the magazine is a photo of a special event or a submitted design.

In 2013, many older magazines were scanned and uploaded to the school's website by former College Archivist Dr Sue Stirling, making them available for anyone to download and view. These range from 1976 through to 2009. According to Dr Stirling, older versions may be made available.

==== Senior Honours Awards ====
The Senior Honours Awards signifies the end of the school year for seniors, and for some Year 13s, it is their last chance to say goodbye. This event is held to honour those who have achieved great success throughout the year academically in years 11, 12 and 13. The event usually consists of musical entertainment and supper afterwards for Year 13s, parents/caregivers, and visitors.

The official party consists of:

- The Senior Management team – the Principal, Deputy Principals and Assistant Principal
- Heads of Departments
- Previous Staff Members of the school (including ex-Principals)
- Staff leaving at the end of the year and special guests (who, for example, may be the local Member of Parliament)
- Representatives from the groups, companies and organisations sponsoring awards and prizes.

The event starts with a Māori Karakia and Mihi, followed by the National Anthem. Afterwards a speech from the chairperson of the Board of Trustees will be read. The Student Co-Leaders for the current year will also read a speech. The event ends with a closing Karakia and a Māori waiata. The awards include Certificates, the Principal's Special Awards, Distinction Awards and Honours Awards, which include the year's Dux Ludorum and Dux Litterarum. The next year's student leaders are also announced.

== Sport ==
Awatapu have a local sporting rivalry with Freyberg High School. Awatapu have been the holders of the Mark Ranby Trophy which is a rugby union competition between these schools.

Awatapu has an annual sports exchange with Cullinane College, Whanganui for junior students (Years 9, 10 and occasionally, but rarely 11) generally competing in basketball, netball and rugby union. The exchange has been running as long as Cullinane has existed.

For senior students (Years 11, 12 and 13), there is an annual exchange with Makoura College in Masterton.

== Notable alumni ==
- Sam Hansen, also known as PNC, New Zealand rapper.
- Kris Gemmell, triathlete.
- Dan Ward-Smith, former professional rugby union player.
- Mariano Vivanco, international photographer.
- Haydn Linsley, member of the boyband Titanium.

== Notable teachers ==
- Paul Ackerley, Olympic gold medal-winning hockey player.
- Waana Davis, Palmerston North city councillor and promoter of traditional Māori arts.
