= New Zealand standard school buildings =

Architectural standards in New Zealand

New Zealand standard school buildings were largely developed and built in the 1950s, 1960s and 1970s. Following the Second World War, more schools and classrooms were needed to address the pre-existing shortage and to handle the increasing school population with the subsequent baby boom. Using standard designs allowed the demand to be met while reducing construction time and costs.

== Primary school designs ==
For the most part, primary school designs varied between education boards.

Designs included:

- Avalon
- Canterbury Open-Air Veranda
- Canterbury "White Lines"
- Canterbury Education Board Unit System (CEBUS)
- Canterbury Open-Plan
- Dominion Basic
- Formula

== Secondary school designs ==
National Film Unit documentary about building new schools in 1957

In contrast to primary schools, secondary school designs were standardised nationally.

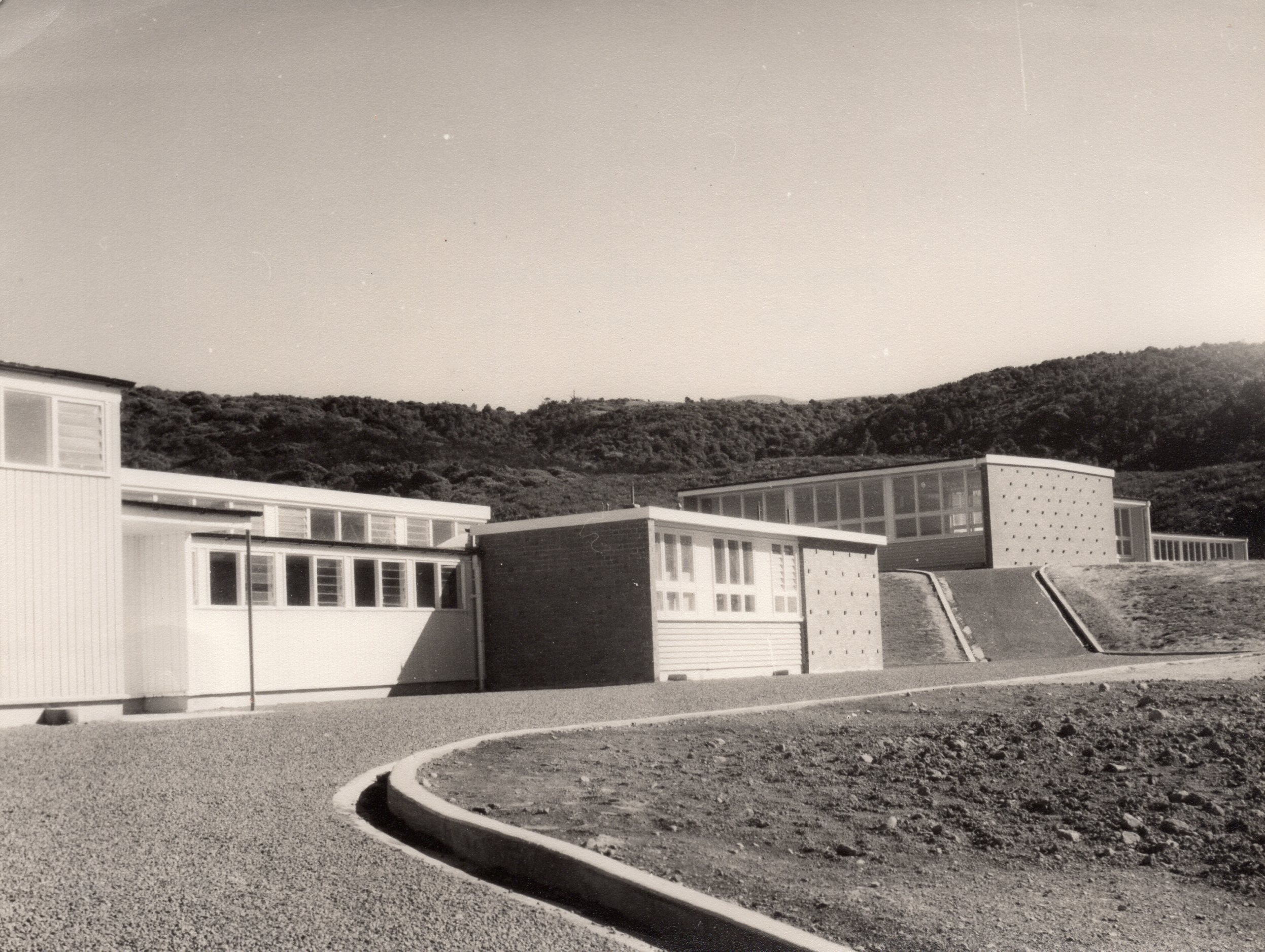
Mana College, a Nelson Single-Storey school, in 1968

=== Nelson Single-Storey ===
The Nelson Single-Storey is characterised by its single-storey H-shaped classroom blocks with a large toilet and cloak area on one side.^{:31–33}

Studies conducted in 1954 saw the move to separate self-contained blocks in secondary schools. The use of blocks eliminated the need for corridors and the savings in cost allowed enabled assembly halls to be constructed. The result was the Nelson Single-Storey school and the first schools of the type opened in 1957.

Schools built to the Nelson Single-Storey plan include:

- Fairfield College, Hamilton
- Mana College, Porirua
- Riccarton High School, Christchurch
- Rotorua Girls' High School, Rotorua
- Taita College, Lower Hutt
- Tauranga Girls' College, Tauranga
- Waimea College, Richmond
- Westlake Girls High School, Auckland
- Whanganui High School, Whanganui

=== Nelson Two-Storey ===
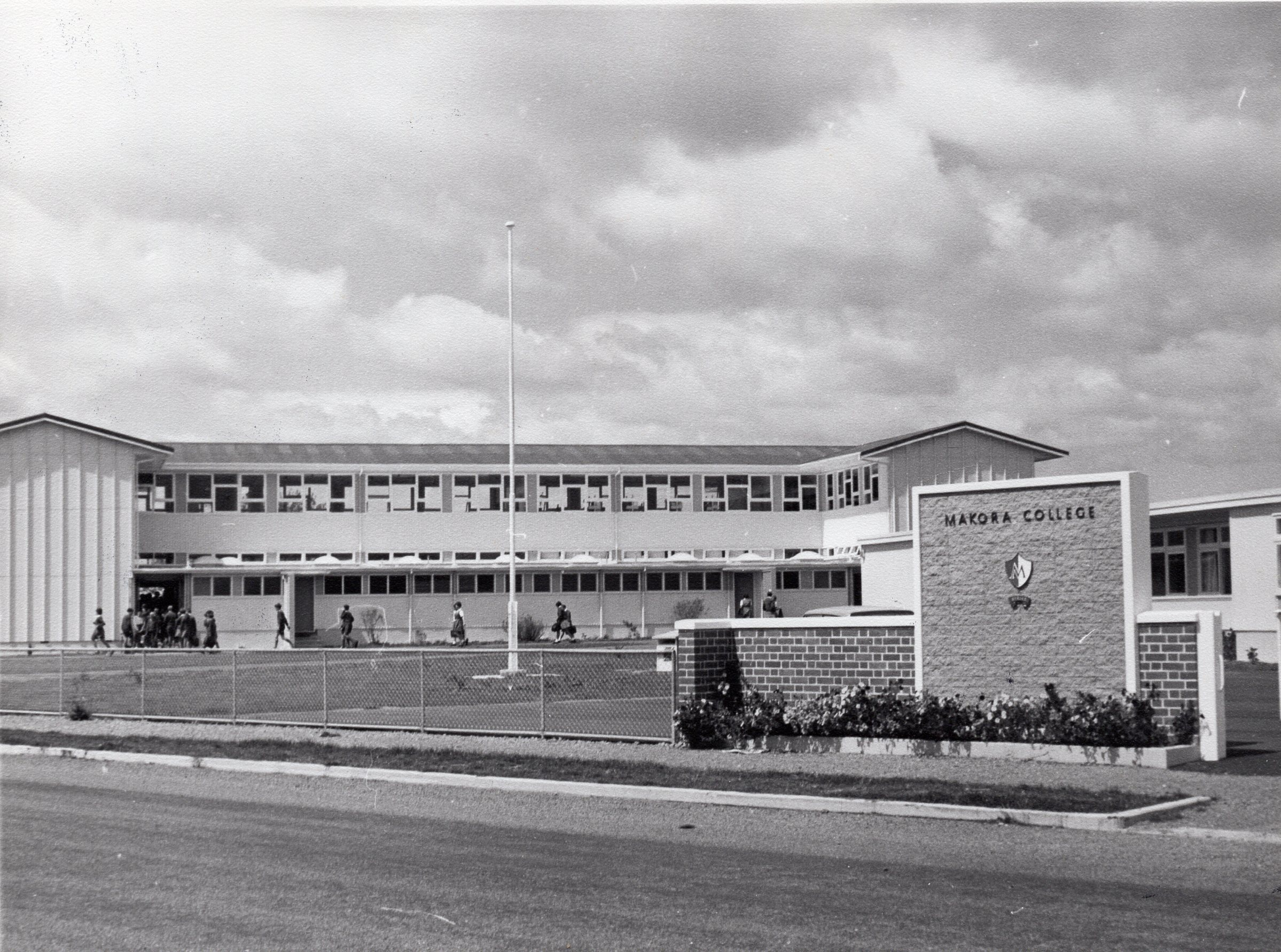
Makora (now Makoura) College, a Nelson Two-Story school, in 1969

The Nelson Two-Storey is a development on the Nelson Single-Storey design and is characterised by its two-storey H-shaped classroom blocks, with stairwells at each end and a large ground-floor toilet and cloak area on one side.^{:115–118} The first Nelson Two-Storey schools opened in 1960, with the last schools opening in 1970.

There is also a T-shaped half version of the Nelson Two-Storey block. Often these were built as the first stage of a full block, but in some cases the second half was never built.^{:115–118} Examples of the half-block exist at Western Heights High School in Rotorua, and Central Southland College in Winton.

Schools built to the Nelson Two-Storey plan include:

- Aorere College, Auckland
- Bayfield High School, Dunedin
- Burnside High School, Christchurch
- Edgewater College, Auckland
- Fraser High School, Hamilton
- Glendowie College, Auckland
- Hillmorton High School, Christchurch
- James Cook High School, Auckland
- Kamo High School, Whangarei
- Karamu High School, Hastings
- Kuranui College, Greytown
- Lytton High School, Gisborne
- Mairehau High School, Christchurch
- Makoura College, Masterton
- Marlborough Girls' College, Blenheim
- Massey High School, Auckland
- Melville High School, Hamilton
- Nayland College, Nelson
- Newlands College, Wellington
- Otumoetai College, Tauranga
- Rosehill College, Auckland
- Spotswood College, New Plymouth
- Taradale High School, Napier
- Tararua College, Pahiatua
- Tawa College, Wellington
- Tokoroa High School, Tokoroa
- Upper Hutt College, Upper Hutt
- Western Heights High School, Rotorua
- Westlake Boys High School, Auckland
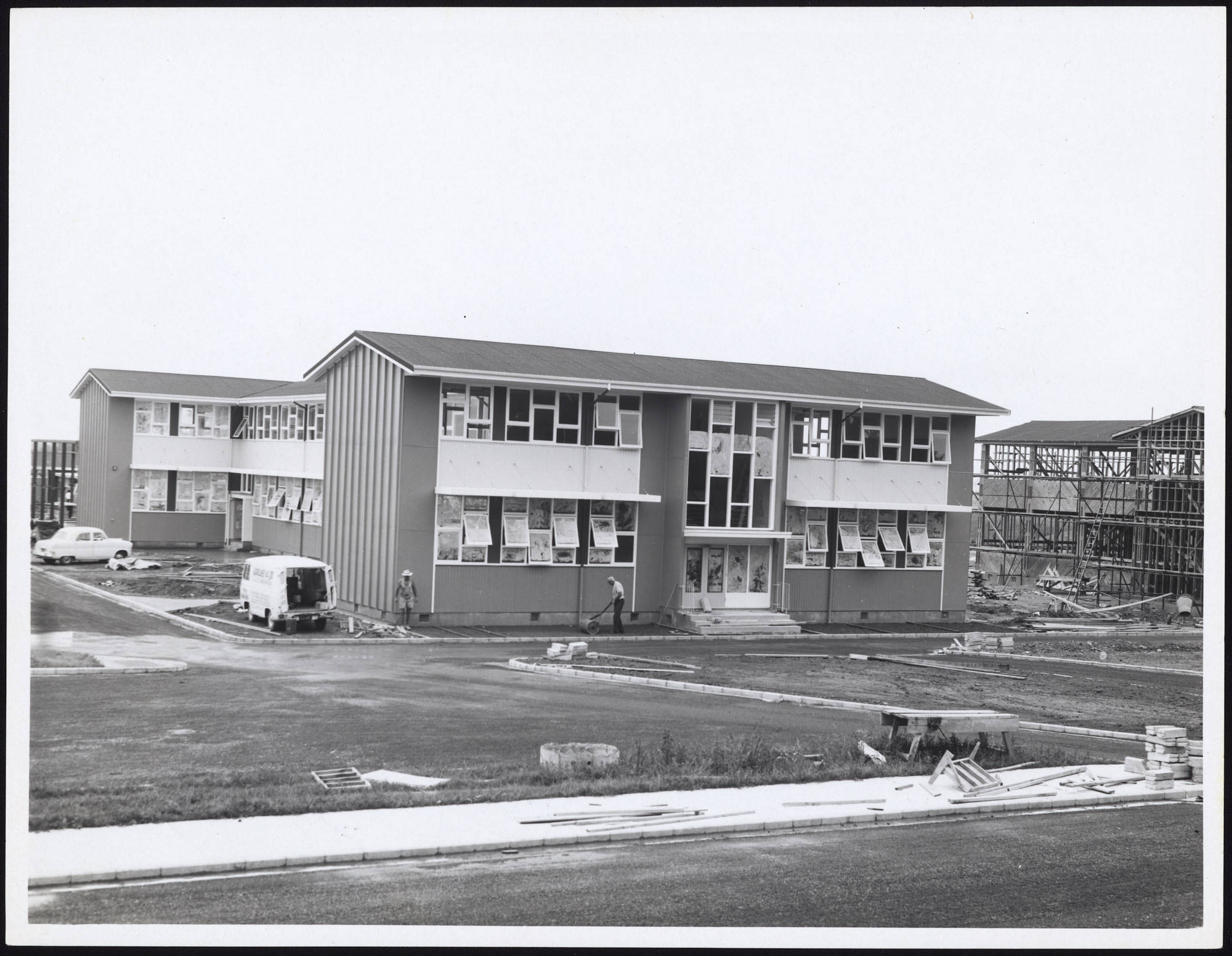
A newly-completed Nelson Two-Storey Block at James Cook High School in January 1968.

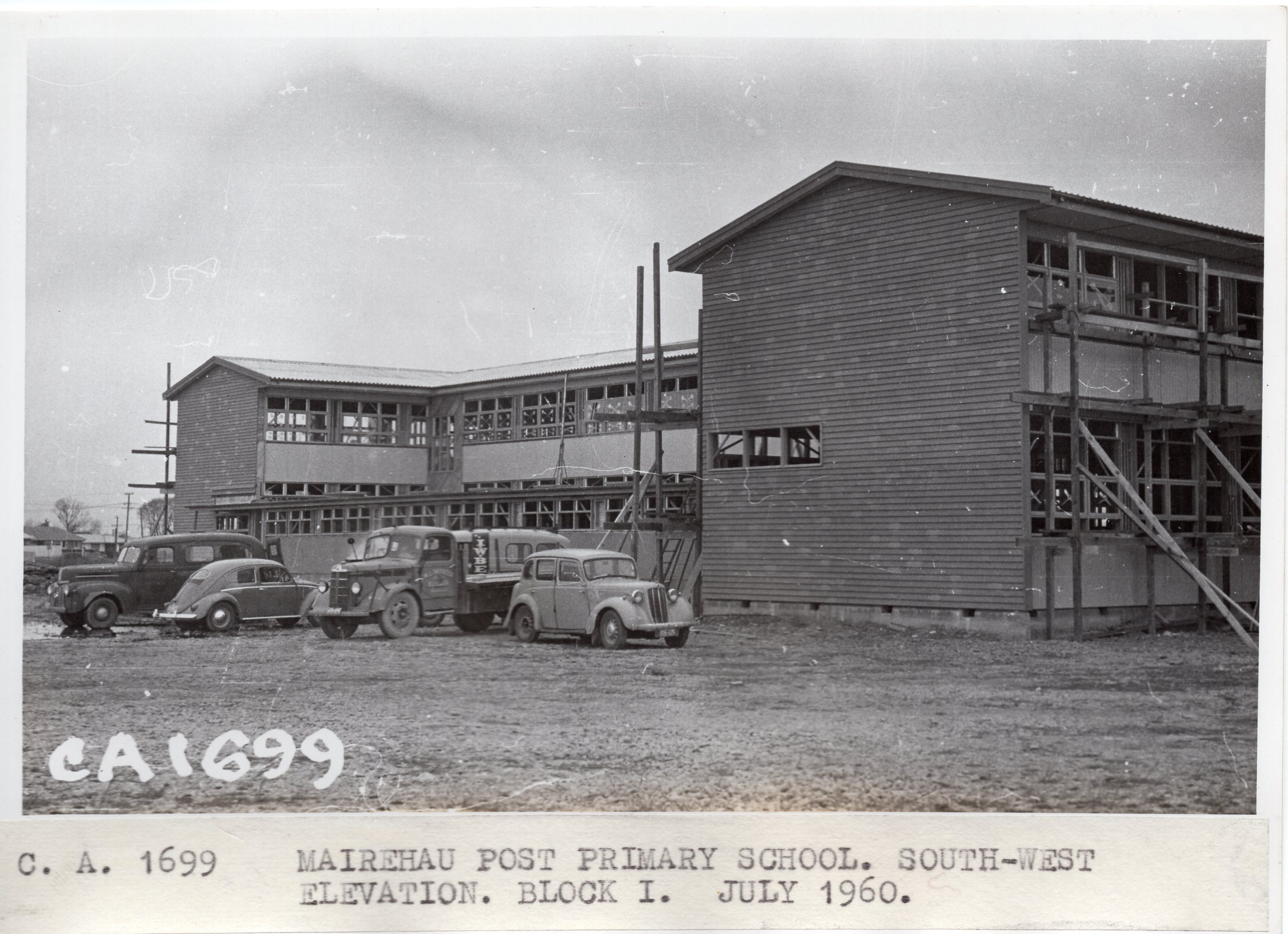
A Nelson Two-Storey Block under construction at Mairehau High School in July 1960.

=== S68 ===
External images
- Scale model of Mangere College, an S68 school, showing proposed stages of construction
- Stage 1 (admin block, first house block with hall, first arts and crafts block, library, half-size gymnasium, boiler house)
- Stage 2 (Stage 1 + senior studies block, extensions to first house block and arts and crafts block, gymnasium extended to full size)
- Stage 3 (Stage 2 + second house block, second gymnasium, additional extension to arts and crafts block)
- Stage 4 (Stage 3 + third house block and auditorium)

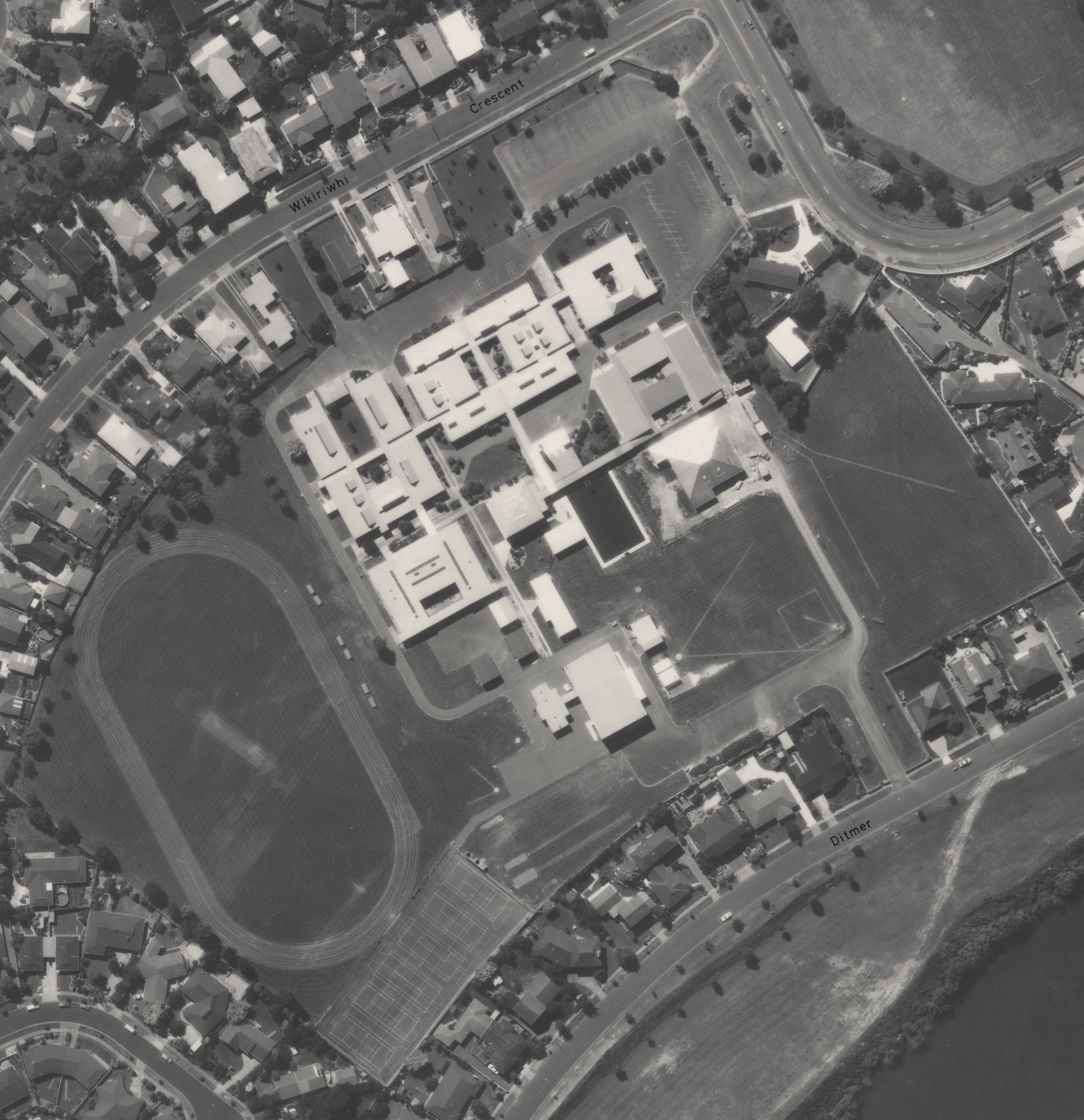
Aerial photo of Awatapu College (opened 1976) in March 1986, showing the schools' four S68 classroom blocks.

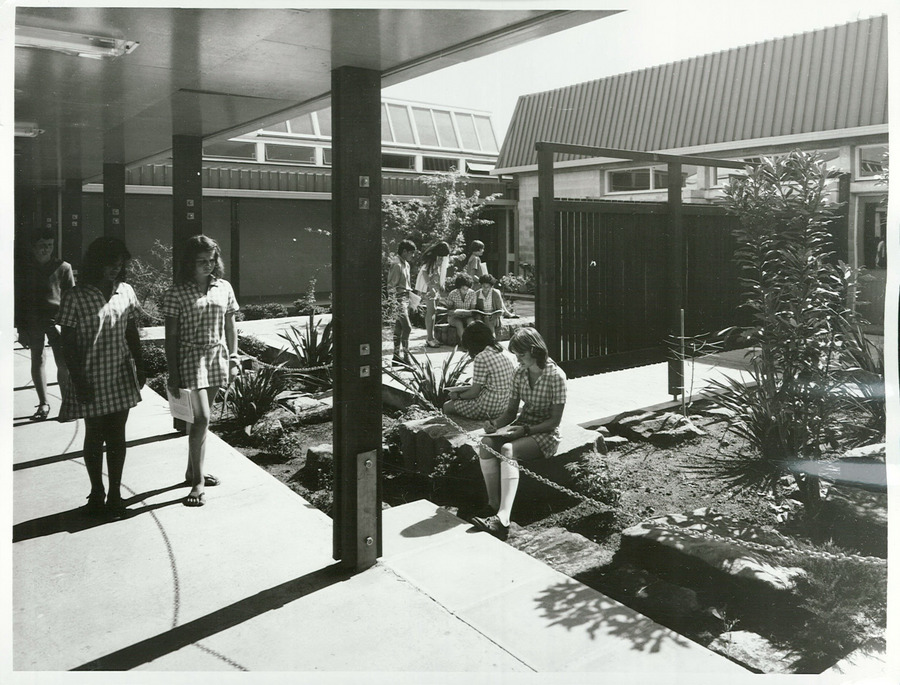
The internal courtyard of an S68 block at Rotorua Lakes High School, 1974

The S68 is characterised by its single-storey classroom blocks of masonry construction, featuring low-pitched roofs and internal open courtyards.^{:43–46} The prototype S68 school was Porirua College, opened in 1968. The first standard S68 schools opened in 1971, with the last schools opening around 1978. The S68 classroom blocks have concrete slab foundations. Internal walls are concrete block, while external walls are double-skin with the inner wall of concrete block and the outer wall of either concrete block or brick. The roofs are low-pitched skillion, generally with timber sarking ceilings and trough section roofing, supported by laminated timber rafters or steel trusses. Some schools have since replaced the timber sarking and trough section roofing with acoustic tiles and butynol roofing respectively. Celestory windows provide lighting and ventilation, and many blocks had large south-facing skylight windows protruding from the classroom roof.^{:43–46} The original low-pitched roofs, skylight windows and internal gutters and downpipes of the S68 are prone to rusting and leaking, causing problems in several schools.

The blocks are generally interconnected by covered walkways, which are also designed to carry services between the blocks. School blocks were arranged so third, fourth and fifth form students (now years 9, 10 and 11 respectively) were grouped together in a common "house" blocks while sixth and seventh form students (now years 12 and 13) were grouped into a "senior studies" block. S68 schools have a common "arts and crafts" block for visual arts and technology subjects, a standalone library (although in some schools, the library is included in one of the house blocks), a gymnasium block, an administration block, and a theatre block with a 400-500 seat auditorium and specialist performing arts classrooms.

The S68 buildings went through at least four designs. The S68 "Mark IV" designs, introduced in 1977-78, were constructed using metric measurements, whereas the first three versions used imperial measurements.

Schools built to the S68 plan include:

- Aotea College, Porirua
- Ashburton College, Ashburton
- Aurora College, Invercargill
- Awatapu College, Palmerston North
- Birkenhead College, Auckland
- Bream Bay College, Ruakaka
- Forest View High School, Tokoroa
- Green Bay High School, Auckland
- Havelock North High School, Havelock North
- Hawera High School, Hawera
- Hillcrest High School, Hamilton
- Hornby High School, Christchurch
- Howick College, Auckland
- Kaiapoi High School, Kaiapoi
- Logan Park High School, Dunedin
- Long Bay College, Auckland
- Mangere College, Auckland
- Paraparaumu College, Paraparaumu
- Rotorua Lakes High School, Rotorua
- Tamatea High School, Napier
- Tangaroa College, Auckland
- Tikipunga High School, Whangarei
- Trident High School, Whakatane
- Tuakau College, Tuakau
- Wainuiomata High School, Lower Hutt
- Waiopehu College, Levin
- Waitakere College, Auckland

== See also ==
- Light Timber Construction schools in Victoria, Australia
