= Jimmy Cotter =

New Zealand rugby union and softball player

- Born: James Alfred Cotter; 17 February 1959
- Died: 5 September 1985 (aged 26) Bombay Hills, New Zealand
- School: Kuranui College

Rugby union career
- Position(s): Fullback; Wing; Centre; First five-eighth
Provincial / State sides
| Years | Team | Apps | (Points) |
| 1977–78, 1981 | Wairarapa Bush | 29 | (59) |
| 1985 | Wellington | 3 | (4) |
International career
| Years | Team | Apps | (Points) |
| 1978 | Junior All Blacks | 4 | (20) |

James Alfred Cotter (17 February 1959 – 5 September 1985) was a New Zealand rugby union and softball player.

== Early life ==
Cotter was educated at Kuranui College in Greytown, and was a member of the school's 1st XV rugby team in 1976.

== Sporting career ==
Cotter represented New Zealand in two sporting codes: rugby union and softball.

=== Rugby union ===
Cotter was a Junior All Black in 1978. A utility back who played in all positions from first five-eighth to fullback, Cotter played 29 games for Wairarapa Bush between 1977 and 1981, and three matches for Wellington in 1985.

=== Softball ===
Cotter played 10 international games for the New Zealand men's national softball team between 1980 and 1984. A powerful batter, he has been described as "one of the greatest softballers produced by New Zealand".

== Death and legacy ==
Cotter died on 5 September 1985 in a road crash on the Bombay Hills, south of Auckland.

Since Cotter's death, the Jimmy Cotter Memorial Trophy has been contested in representative rugby matches between Wairarapa Bush and Wellington. Cotter was inducted into the Softball New Zealand Hall of Fame in 1998. Another Jimmy Cotter Memorial Trophy is awarded by Softball New Zealand to the emerging player of the year.
