= Rotorua Lakes High School =

Location
- Porikapa Road, Owhata, Rotorua, New Zealand; 38.13638°S 176.30161°E

Information
- Funding type: State
- Motto: Māori: Mauria Te Pono (Keep Steadfastly to the Truth)
- Established: 1971
- Ministry of Education Institution no.: 154
- Principal: Jon Ward
- Staff: 75
- Years offered: 9–13
- Gender: Co-educational
- Enrolment: 630 (July 2026)
- Houses: Four: Okareka; Rotokakahi; Tarawera; Tikitapu
- Colours: Navy, gold and teal
- Socio-economic decile: 5M
- Website: rotorualakes.school.nz

Rotorua Lakes High School, commonly known as Lakes High, or simply Lakes, is a state school educating boys and girls from Year 9 to Year 13. It is situated in Owhata, in the eastern suburbs of Rotorua, New Zealand, and draws many of its students from the eastern Rotorua urban area, and the semi-rural lakes communities to the south and east of Rotorua; this giving rise to the name Rotorua Lakes.

The school has a roll of 706 students from year 9 to 13. It offers the National Certificate of Educational Achievement qualification, alongside New Zealand Scholarship. Opened in 1971, the school is the youngest secondary school in Rotorua and is built in the "S68" style common for secondary schools in New Zealand in this period. Special features of the school include a special needs unit, Astroturf, squash court and horticulture complex.

== About the school ==
=== Buildings ===
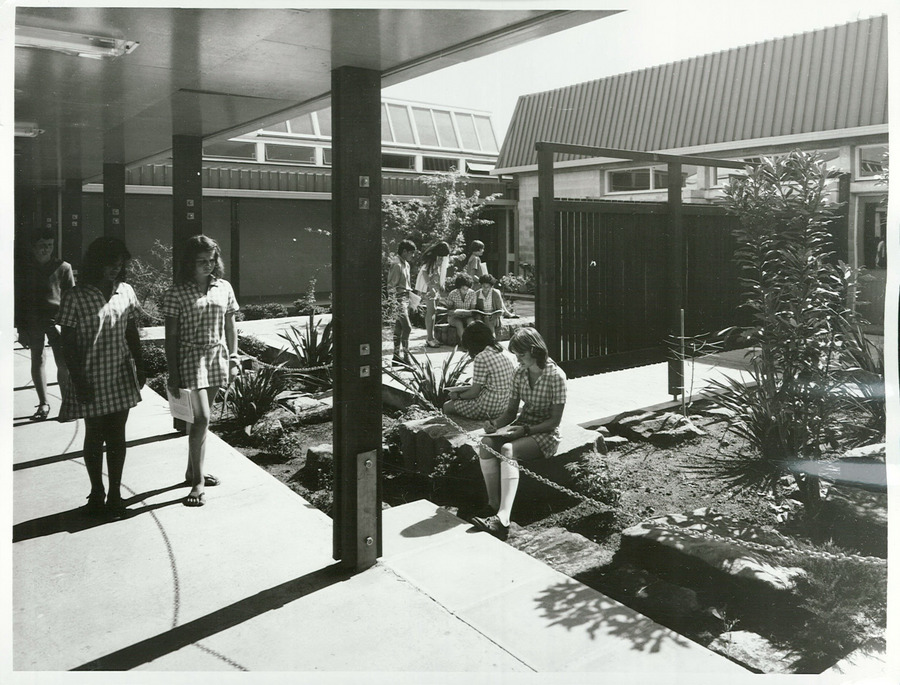
Rotorua Lakes High School in 1974, showing the internal courtyard in one of the S68 classroom blocks.

Much of the school is built in the "S68" style common for school buildings built in the period 1968 to 1978, featuring single-storey blocks of rooms with cinderblock concrete construction, low-pitched roofs and internal courtyards.

Buildings in the school include standard classroom and administrative blocks, as well as blocks for science, technology, the library, and music. The school's hall is known as the D.C. Price Auditorium in honour of the school's foundation principal.

The school also has a wharenui, a purpose-built Health and Wellness Centre, a special needs education centre, gymnasium and netball courts, squash courts, and an Astroturf for hockey, tennis, netball and other sports.

=== Principals ===
- Des Price 1971–1986
- Frank Solomon 1987–1994
- John Ellis 1995–2007
- Peter Bruce Walker 2008–2019
- Jon Ward 2019–2025
- Gwyneth Cooper 2026

=== Symbols ===
The school colours of Rotorua Lakes High School are navy blue, teal and gold. The school logo is a stylised waha ika (traditional Māori weapon), which contains a map of all of the lakes in the Rotorua District. The school motto is in Māori, "Mauria Te Pono" which translates in English as "Keep Steadfastly to the Truth".

=== Houses ===
Rotorua Lakes High School has four houses, each named after one of the many lakes in the Rotorua area. Each house has its own House Colour, as follows:

Name of House	Colour	Lake
Okareka	Gold	Lake Okareka
Tikitapu	Blue	Lake Tikitapu
Tarawera	Red	Lake Tarawera
Rotokakahi	Green	Lake Rotokakahi

== Students ==
As of March 2019, the school has 706 students from years 9 to 13. The school has seen a general roll increase since 2011. This number includes 9 international students, mostly from China. The student body is currently around 47% Māori, 45% European, and 6% of other ethnic backgrounds including Pacific and Asian.

As of 2026, Rotorua Lakes High School has an Equity Index of 473, placing it amongst schools whose students have above average socioeconomic barriers to achievement (roughly equivalent to decile 4 under the former socio-economic decile system).

== Curricular and co-curricular ==
=== Academic ===
The school offers NCEA Levels 1, 2 and 3 at Year 11, 12 and 13 respectively, in a range of subjects. NZ Scholarship is offered to able Year 13 students in some subjects. Junior students participate in a varied programme, which follows the New Zealand Curriculum. The school has an annual academic exchange with Forest View High School, in Tokoroa, in the subjects of Debating, Mathematics, General Knowledge, Economics, Science and Visual Arts.

Achievement rates for NCEA Levels 1–3, for both Māori and non-Māori students, are broadly in line with national averages.

=== Cultural ===
Rotorua Lakes High School is a regular participant in a number of cultural events. These include Kapa Haka, Stage Challenge, Shakespeare in Schools, Cyril Bassett-RSA Speech Competition, Manu Korero and others. The school also organises regular overseas trips for senior students who study particular subjects. In particular, the regular trip to Europe, usually including France and Italy runs every three or four years for senior students of French, History, Geography, Classics and Tourism.

=== Sport ===
The school fields individuals and teams in a wide range of sports. Individual sports on offer include athletics and cross country, swimming, mountain biking, cycling, and orienteering.

== Notable alumni ==
- Erena Mikaere – New Zealand netball international.
- Steven Adams – Professional basketballer, playing in the NBA.
- Shane Legg – Academic and founder of DeepMind Technologies.
