= Bernadette Logue =

New Zealand life coach and writer

- Other name: B
- Known for: Spiritual Life Coach & Author
- Spouse: Aaron Jade

Academic background
- Education: Kuranui College
- Alma mater: Victoria University

Bernadette Logue is a Spiritual Life Coach and Author. She founded her coaching practice and community in 2010.

== Works ==
- Pinch Me: How Following The Signals Changed My Life Bernadette Logue (2012.) ISBN 0473206129, ISBN 9780473206123
- Going Out on a Limb: How Signals Led Me Beyond My Limits and Into Truth Bernadette Logue (2013.) ISBN 0473233517, ISBN 9780473233518
- Unleash Your Life: 166 Truths to Unlock Your Inner Peace, Freedom & Success Bernadette Logue (2014.) ISBN 0473297213, ISBN 9780473297213
- Your Soul Journey Simplified: A Method for Aligning to Your Spiritual Path Bernadette Logue (2023.) ASIN B0BYQ38PVL, ASIN B0C1DHYR14
