= Max Abbott =

New Zealand psychologist

Max Abbott CNZM
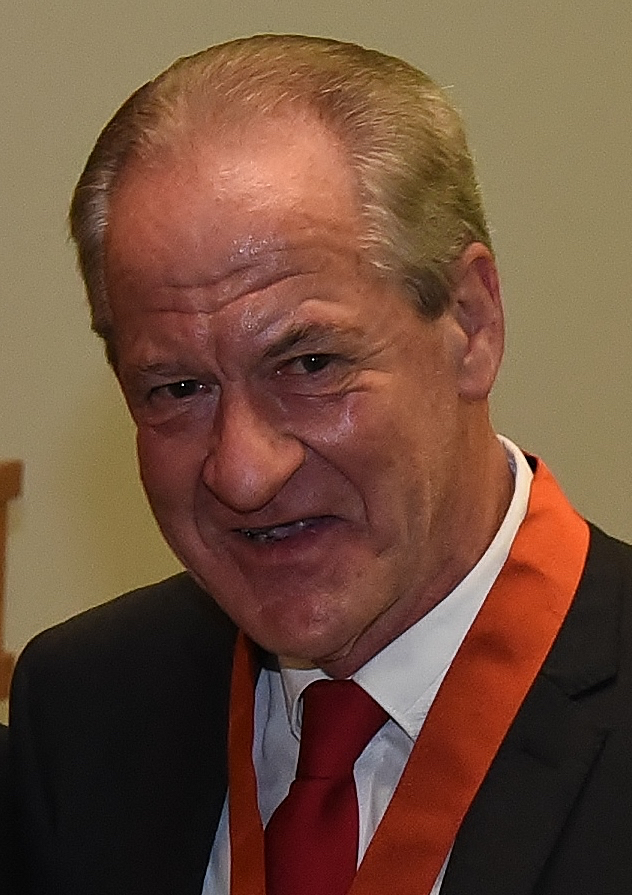
- Abbott in 2016
- Born: Max Wenden Abbott; 7 June 1951 (age 75); Featherston, New Zealand

Academic background
- Education: University of Canterbury
- Thesis: Inter-relations between cognitive factors in the prediction of outcome among chronic alcoholics (1979)
- Doctoral advisor: Robert Gregson

Academic work
- Discipline: Psychology
- Institutions: Auckland University of Technology

Max Wenden Abbott CNZM (born 7 June 1951) is a New Zealand psychologist. He served as director of the New Zealand Mental Health Foundation from 1981 to 1991. An expert in gambling addiction, he was a professor at Auckland University of Technology from 1991 to 2020, when he resigned following an allegation of sexual harassment.

== Early life and education ==
Born in Featherston on 7 June 1951, Abbott was educated at Kuranui College in Greytown. He went on to study at Victoria University of Wellington, where he earned Bachelor of Arts and Bachelor of Science degrees in 1971 and 1973, respectively. He then completed a diploma at Christchurch Secondary Teachers' College in 1974, and a Master of Arts degree at the University of Canterbury in 1977. He subsequently undertook doctoral studies at Canterbury; his PhD thesis, supervised by Robert Gregson and completed in 1979, was titled Inter-relations between cognitive factors in the prediction of outcome among chronic alcoholics. In 1980, Abbott received a Postgraduate Diploma in Clinical Psychology from the University of Canterbury.

== Career ==
Abbott was the inaugural national director of the Mental Health Foundation, a position he held from 1981 until 1991. He was also president of the World Federation for Mental Health from 1991 to 1993.

In 1991, Abbott joined the Auckland Institute of Technology—now Auckland University of Technology (AUT)—as dean of the Faculty of Health and Environmental Sciences, and remained there until his resignation in 2020. He also served as pro-vice-chancellor at AUT, and is a noted expert in the field of gambling addiction.

== Honours and awards ==
In 1990, Abbott was awarded the New Zealand 1990 Commemoration Medal. In the 2016 New Year Honours, he was appointed a Companion of the New Zealand Order of Merit, for services to health, science and education. In 2018, Abbott was a recipient of AUT's University Medal.

== Controversy ==
In August 2019, a five-page complaint was laid against Abbott for sexual harassment of an overseas colleague over a period of two years. After an investigation, Abbott resigned from AUT, and apologised to the complainant.
