= Tom Hullena =

Tom Hullena MNZM
- Born: Thomas Henry Hullena; Masterton, New Zealand
- Education: Wairarapa College

Tom Hullena is a former principal at Makoura College he worked at the college from 2009 to 2015. He also taught at Kuranui College as a HOD physical Education. Tom Hullena received the MNZM for services to education in 2016.

== Career ==
He worked mostly 70 hours a week or more over seven years while principal at Makoura. He has been an educator for more than three decades and now helps lead the development of Youth in Education, Training and Employment schemes for the Ministry of Education. He spent three years with Victoria University as a lecturer, researcher and teacher training adviser from 2005 to 2008. In 2014 he received the Prime Minister's Excellence Award for Leadership.
