= Waana Davis =

New Zealand teacher, politician and administrator

Waana Davis QSO
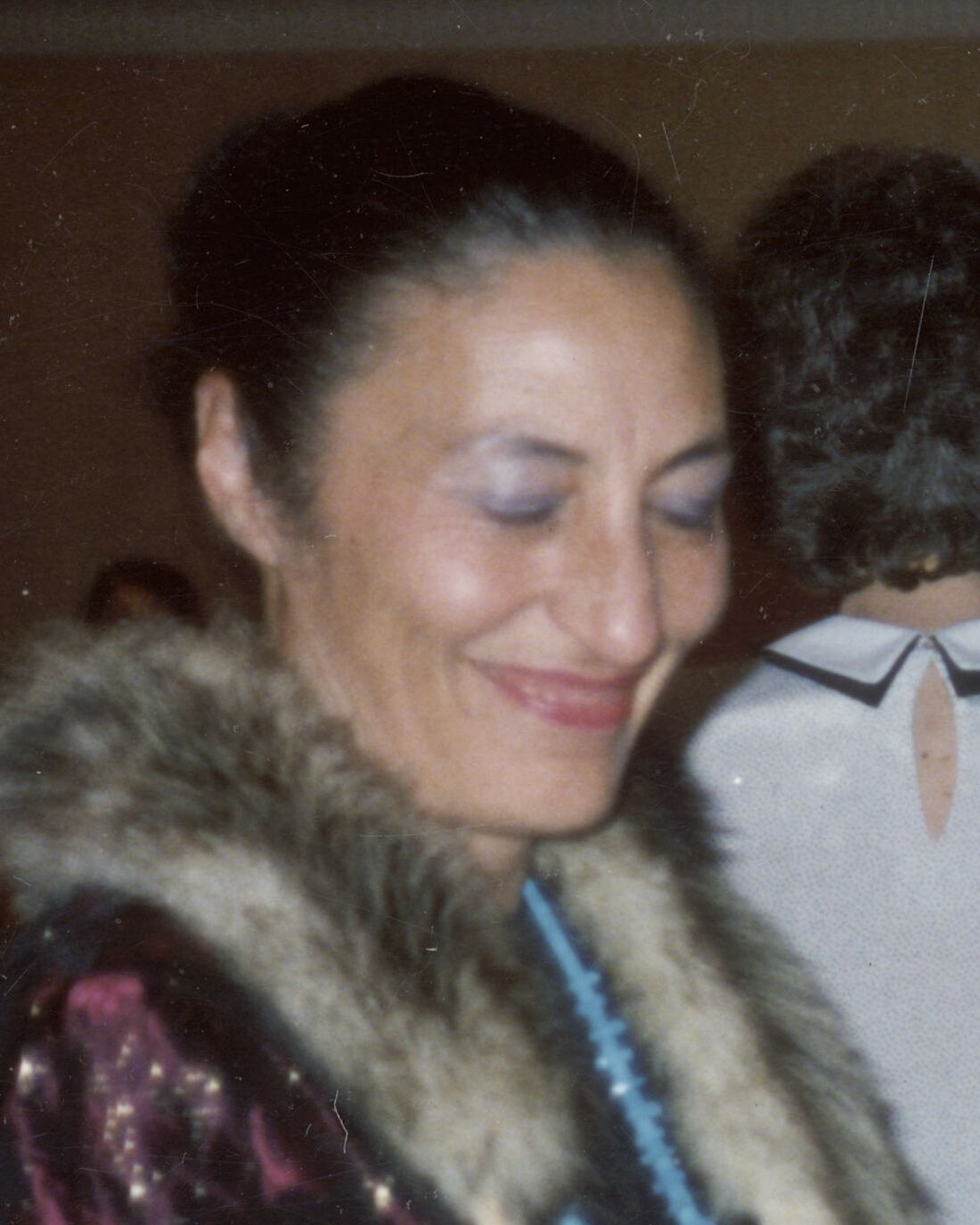
- Davis, c. 1986

Palmerston North City Councillor
- In office 1984–1998

Personal details
- Born: 15 January 1938; Whakatāne, New Zealand
- Died: 14 June 2019 (aged 81)
- Occupation: Politician, education and arts advocate and administrator

Waana Morrell Davis QSO (née Grant; 15 January 1938 – 14 June 2019) was a New Zealand Māori teacher, city councillor for Palmerston North, a founding member of Te Roopu Raranga Whatu o Aotearoa, chairperson of Toi Māori Aotearoa and a member of the New Zealand Conservation Authority. Davis was affiliated with the Ngāti Awa and Ngāti Kahungunu iwi.

== Biography ==
Davis was born in Whakatāne on 15 January 1938, the daughter of Tom and Margaret Grant. She became a schoolteacher and was the senior mistress at Awatapu College. In 1983, Davis was one of the original founding members of the steering committee for Aotearoa Moana Nui A Kiwa Weavers which would be succeeded by Te Roopu Raranga Whatu o Aotearoa. In 1984, she was appointed as a Palmerston North city councillor, and was re-elected at subsequent local-body elections until she was defeated in 1998 by a slim margin. In 1991, Davis represented New Zealand at the YWCA World Conference in Oslo and visited museum directors of museums with holdings of taonga Māaori, in Germany, Austria, Holland, the United Kingdom and Canada.

Davis went on to be a founding kaitiaki of Toi Māori Aotearoa and then served as the chairperson of the Toi Māori Aotearoa Board from 1999 to 2019. In the 2002 Queen's Birthday and Golden Jubilee Honours, Davis was appointed a Companion of the Queen's Service Order for public services. In 2007, Davis was appointed a member of the New Zealand Conservation Authority. She continued to serve until 2017.

Davis described herself as a "facilitator rather than a weaver" but noted that she was "committed to weavers and the important role that raranga plays in Māori society".

Davis died on 14 June 2019, and was buried at Whakatāne.

== Family ==
Davis was married to Frank Davis, a painter and lecturer at the former Palmerston North Teachers' College.
