= John Cornes (rugby union) =

Australian rugby union player

- Born: John Reginald Cornes; 30 October 1947 Cambridge, New Zealand
- Died: 27 March 2014 (aged 66)
- School: Kuranui College

Rugby union career
- Position: scrum-half
International career
Years	Team	Apps	(Points)
1972	Wallabies	1	(0)

John Reginald Cornes (30 October 1947 – 27 March 2014) was a rugby union player who represented Australia.

Cornes, a scrum-half, was born in Cambridge, New Zealand and claimed 1 international rugby cap for Australia.
