= Mākoura College =

Secondary school in Masterton, New Zealand

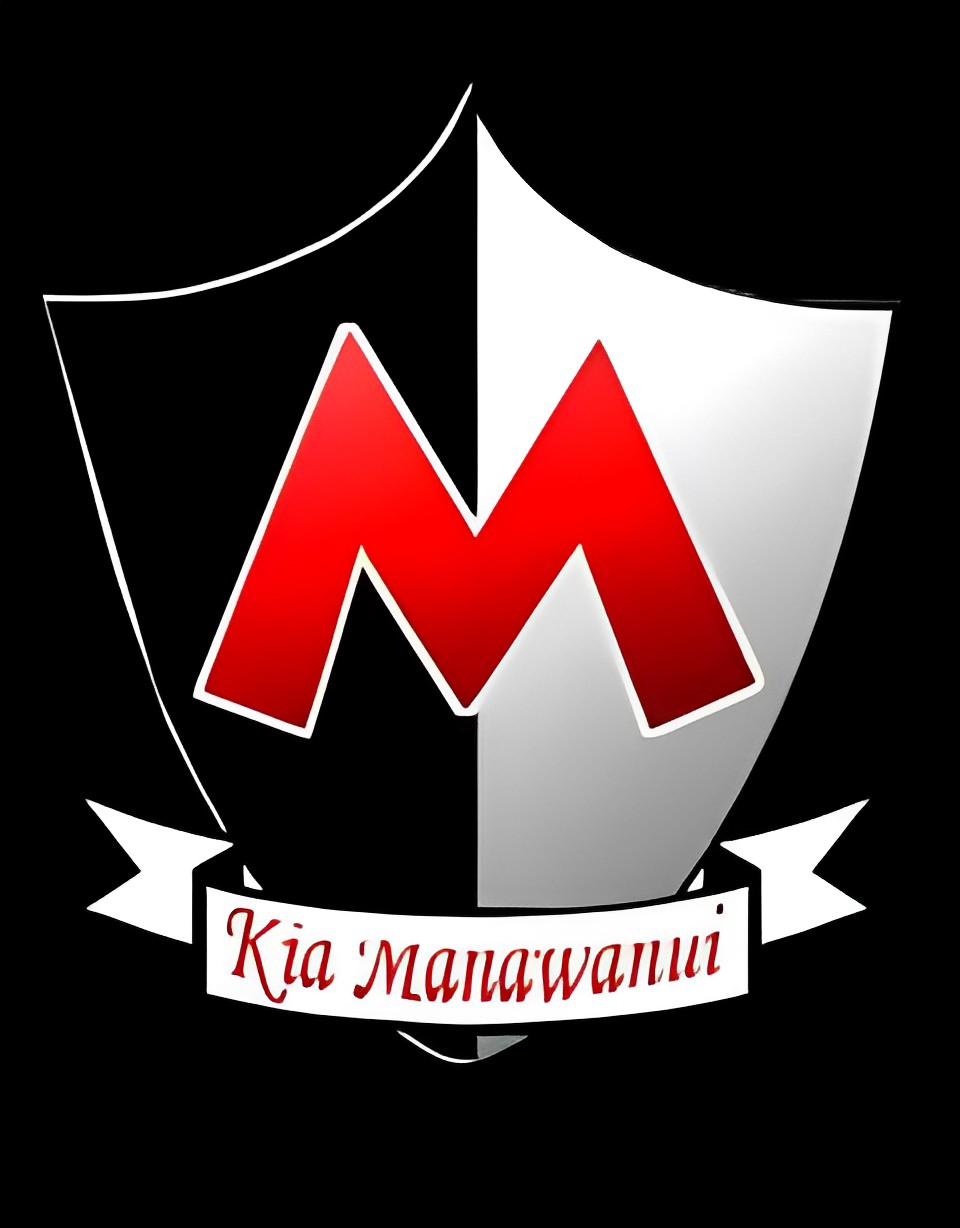

Location
- Makora Road; Masterton 5810; New Zealand; 40.9620°S 175.6662°E

Information
- Type: State Co-educational Secondary Years 9–13
- Motto: Kia Manawanui
- Established: 1968
- Ministry of Education Institution no.: 243
- Principal: Simon Fuller
- Enrolment: 358 (July 2026)
- Colours: Black and red
- Socio-economic decile: 3G
- Website: mc.school.nz

Mākoura College (spelled Makora College prior to 1990) is a state co-educational secondary school located in Masterton, New Zealand. The school opened in 1968 as the town's second state secondary school, alongside Wairarapa College. Serving Years 9 to 13 (ages 12 to 18), the school has a roll of 358 students as of July 2026.

== History ==
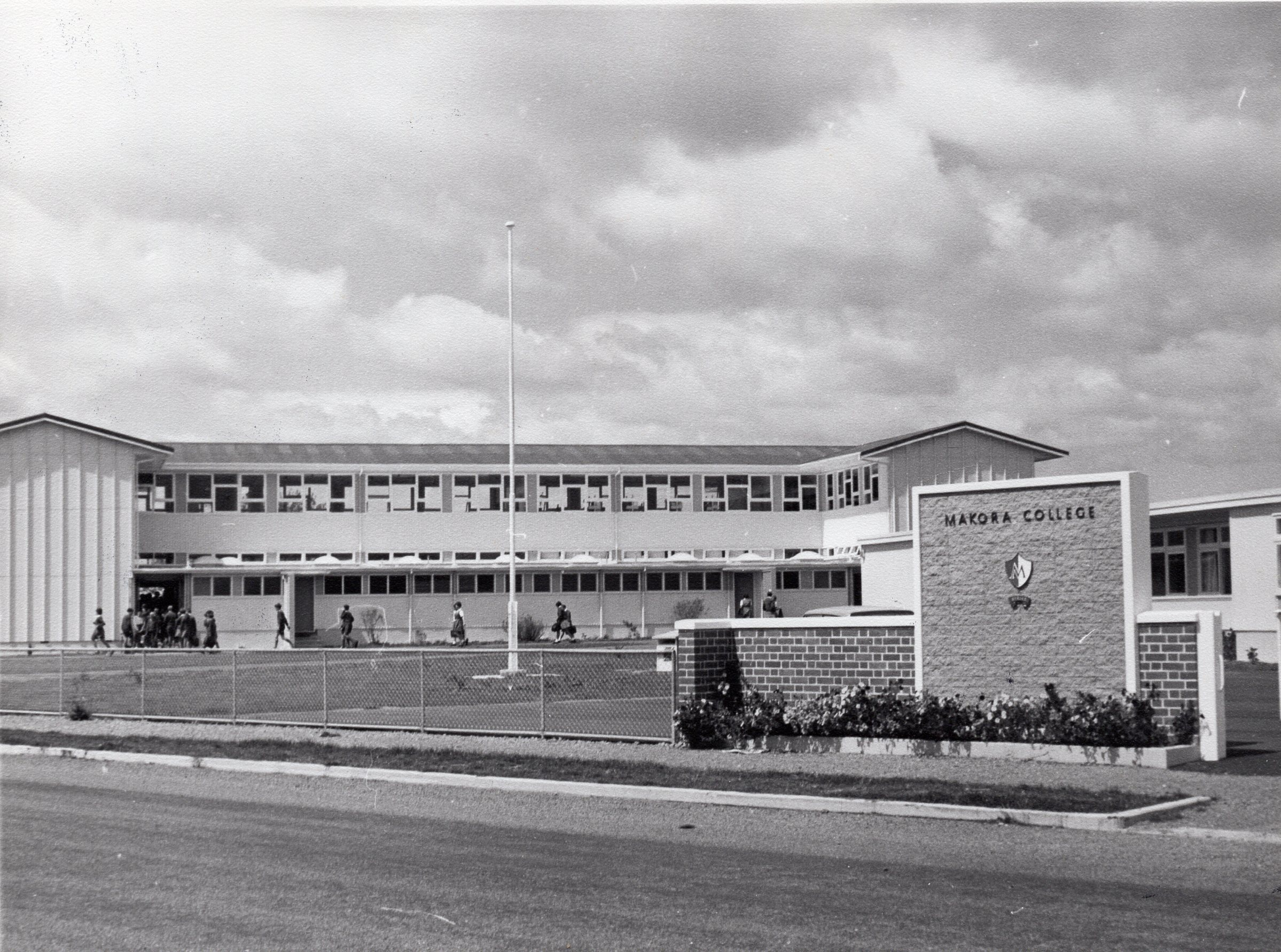
Makora College in 1969.

Mākoura College was established in 1968 to cope with an expanding youth population in the Masterton district. It began with a roll of approximately 800, and was governed by the same Board of Governors as nearby Wairarapa College.

The college was sited on the eastern side of Masterton, close to several primary schools, and a then government-owned printing press.

During the Tomorrow's Schools reforms of the late 1980s, a stand-alone Board of Trustees was instated.

== Facilities ==
The school's classrooms are largely contained within two 2-story H-shaped Nelson Blocks, although a technology block and arts block also house classes pertaining to their subject areas. The school also contains a hall, library, gymnasium, multi-purpose sports turf and Teen Parent Unit. Makoura College also has a computer lab with 25 PCs.

In 2011 The school was refurbished. One of the Nelson blocks was rebuilt to house the junior school Te Kura Teina years 9 and 10 as well as the Wharenui. The other Nelson block was demolished and replaced by new classrooms.

== Potential closure ==
In early April 2008, a private meeting was held between the Ministry of Education, the Makoura College Board of Trustees chairperson and the Wairarapa College board chairperson. Since the meeting, the Makoura College Board has disclosed that it feels that the college should be merged with nearby Wairarapa College or closed. The board blamed the closure on a declining roll, which it suggested was the result of a declining population and "the socio-economic, racist and snobbish attitudes that have developed in Masterton around the so-called East/West divide". A public meeting was held to discuss the consultation, and submissions were invited to the Board of Trustees, with approximately 225 being received. College students initiated a petition in support of the school, which received approximately 7,512 signatures. Local Member of Parliament John Hayes came out in support of the school and suggested the replacement of the school's management.

On 7 August 2009, the Board of Trustees announced its resignation The Board was replaced by commissioner Tim White. The Principal, Chris Scott, also resigned and was replaced in December 2008.

Former pupil Jemaine Clement and Flight of the Conchords partner Bret McKenzie played a concert to an audience of 2,000 on 31 March 2009, raising 70,000 dollars for the school.

In 2018, the college celebrated its 50th Anniversary Reunion.

== Principals ==
Period	Principal
1968–1975	Noel Scott
1975–1985	Noel Preston
1986–1990	Allen Chang
1991–1997	Paul Towers
1997–2008	Chris Scott
2008–2015	Tom Hullena
2016–2019	Paul Green
2020–2023	Marion Harvey
2023–2023	Victoria Kerr
2023–present	Simon Fuller

== Notable alumni ==
- Jemaine Clement – comedian, musician
- Andrew Judd – politician, activist
