= Blamires =

Blamires is a surname. Notable people by that name include:

- Harry Blamires (1916−2017), Anglican theologian.
- Henry Blamires (1871–1965), New Zealand first-class cricketer and clergyman.
- Steve Blamires (born 1955), researcher and historian in the field of Neopaganism, Celtic spirituality, and folklore.
- Edgar Percy Blamires (1878–1967), New Zealand Methodist minister.
- Emmanuel Blamires (1850–1886), English first-class cricketer.
- Ernest Blamires (1881–1963), New Zealand first-class cricketer and clergyman.

== See also ==
- Blamire, surname
