= NZM (disambiguation) =

NZM is Neue Zeitschrift für Musik, a German music magazine.

NZM may also refer to:

- Mount Cook Airline (ICAO: NZM)
- Hazrat Nizamuddin railway station (station code: NZM)
- Zeme language (ISO 639:nzm)

== See also ==
- NZMS (disambiguation)
