= Solway, New Zealand =

Suburb of Masterton, New Zealand

Solway
- Suburb
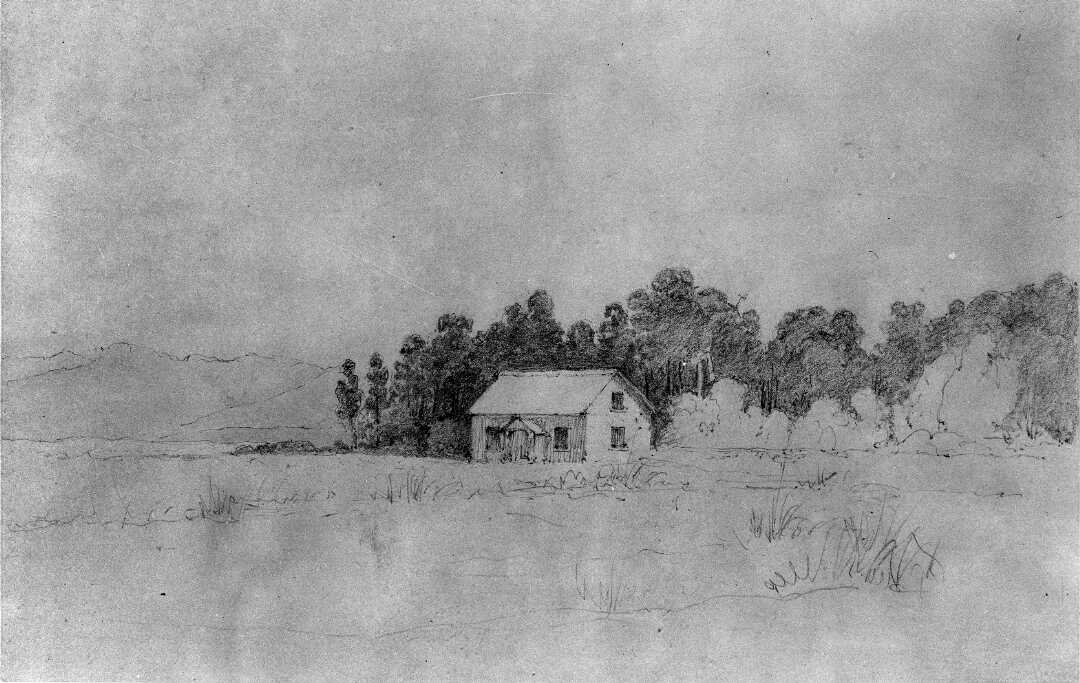
- Donald's homestead at Manaia in front of a corner of Kuripuni Bush, February 1849; William Mein Smith
- Interactive map of Solway
- Coordinates: 40.959°S 175.628°E
- Country: New Zealand
- City: Masterton
- Local authority: Masterton District Council

Area
  - Land: 846 ha (2,090 acres)

Population (June 2025)
  - Total: 7,220
  - Density: 853/km^{2} (2,210/sq mi)
- Railway stations: Solway railway station
- Airports: Hood Aerodrome

Upper Plain	Ngaumutawa	Kuripuni
	Solway	Masterton East
Carterton

Solway is an old-established residential suburb near the Waingawa River in the south-western part of Masterton, the principal town in the Wairarapa Valley of New Zealand's North Island. It was a small part of Manaia run on which Masterton is built. It takes its present name from Solway House built in 1877 for W. H. Donald.

Solway College, a Presbyterian girls' boarding school, was established in Solway House in 1916 but Solway's central feature remains the near-moribund Masterton Agricultural & Pastoral Association's Solway Showgrounds (Note: previously in Dixon Street) opened in 1911. A Wairarapa Farmers Market for artisan produce is held under the grandstand each Saturday morning.

Solway also has several parks and reserves, including the Masterton Trust Lands Trust's Millennium Reserve built over the Acclimatisation Society's trout hatcheries and South Park, a softball field and dog-walking area.

== History ==
Donald Donald (1854—1922) born at Manaia is reported to have said the original name for the area now known as Solway was Purātā, a Maori name for a flowering Rātā.

Solway House was a Donald homestead built in 1877 on part of Manaia, a 30,000 acre run owned by partners W. B. Rhodes and William Hodgson Donald (1815—1885), manager of the run. Donald married in England and came to New Zealand in 1842. He first established his family at Pencarrow then by 1849 became one of the first European farmers to settle in the Wairarapa. Wairarapa M.P. Haddon Donald was a descendant. Until the time of the showgrounds when the name Solway seems to have been generally recognised the 1877 homestead's address was Solway House, Manaia.

W. H. Donald named Solway House after the Cumberland manor-house he was born and grew up in, the now-demolished Solway House on the banks of the Whampool River between Anthorn and Cardurnock.

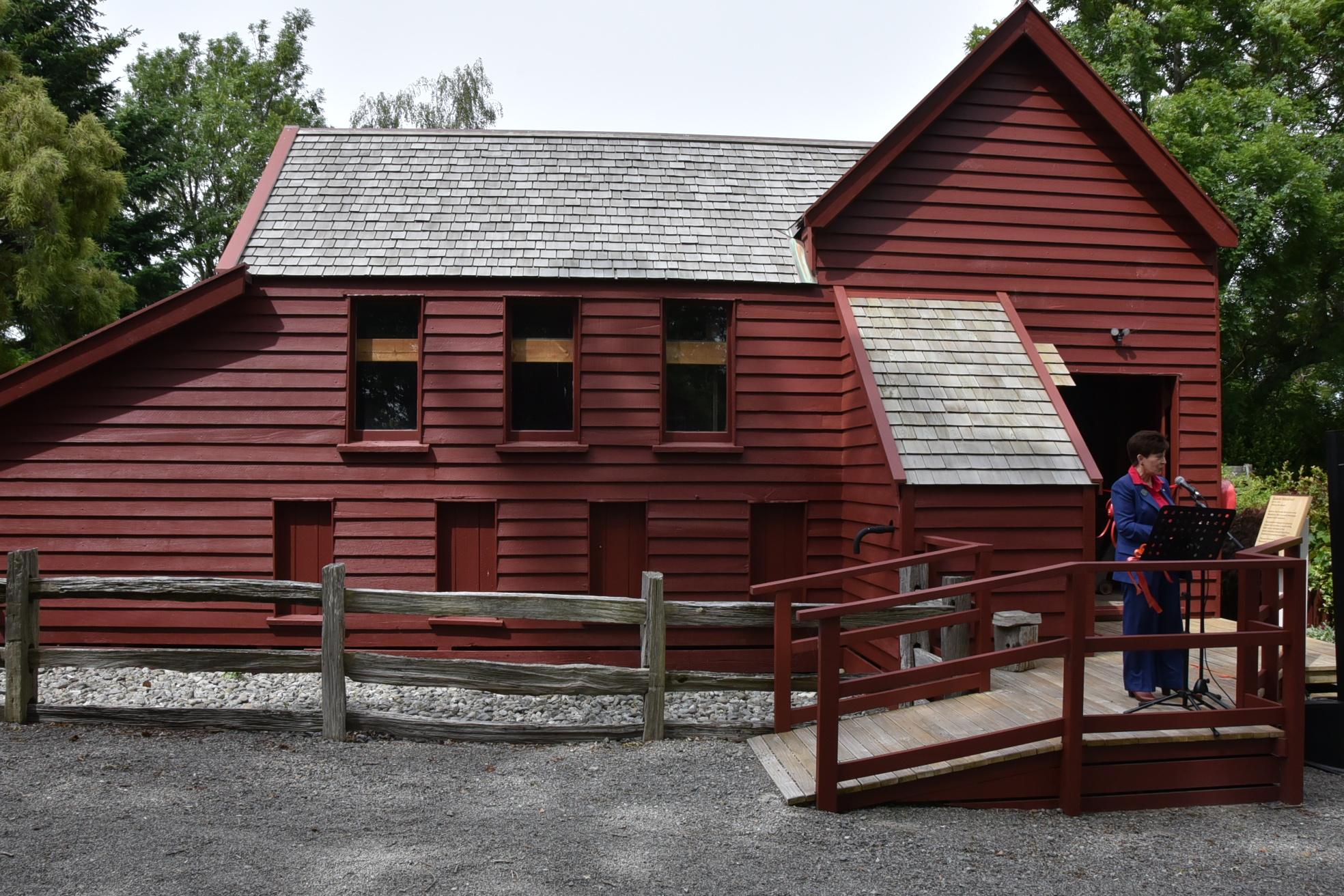
Manaia woolshed at Cobblestones restored and re-opened December 2020

Manaia run or station stretched from the Waingawa to the Waipoua, where it met with Te Ore Ore station, and the original run grazed cattle on most of the Taratahi. On the 12 of July 1951, Brenda Donald (Note: married Archibald Kennedy Arnot, (1841—1872) East Indian Navy.) became the first Pākehā woman born in Masterton, at Manaia. In 1859, Barney Rhodes sold up 14,000 acres including some 1300 acres of freehold, but Donald Donald kept the 640 acres from Kuripuni triangle to the river known as Solway and his elder brother, Rhodes Donald (1847—1917), kept an adjacent portion with the name Manaia. The original Manaia house burned down. Rhodes Donald built a new house which he sold to John and George Judd. That part of Manaia Road was renamed Judd's Road. The original Manaia woolshed built on the Waingawa side of what is now Judd's Road is the oldest settler building in Masterton, and is now part of Greytown's Cobblestones Museum. At Cobblestones the woolshed displays a Manaia invention and development, a Donald patented wool press. Made in Perry Street, Masterton as well as Sydney, these presses were sent all over the world.

A new 80-lot subdivision received planning approval in September 2013.

== Demographics ==
Solway, comprising the statistical areas of Solway North and Solway South, covers 8.46 km^{2} (3.27 sq mi). It had an estimated population of 7,220 as of June 2025, with a population density of 853 people per km^{2}.

Historical population
Year	Pop.	±% p.a.
2006	4,923	—
2013	5,151	+0.65%
2018	5,808	+2.43%
2023	6,771	+3.12%

Solway had a population of 6,771 in the 2023 New Zealand census, an increase of 963 people (16.6%) since the 2018 census, and an increase of 1,620 people (31.5%) since the 2013 census. There were 3,246 males, 3,507 females, and 18 people of other genders in 2,643 dwellings. 2.8% of people identified as LGBTIQ+. The median age was 38.2 years (compared with 38.1 years nationally). There were 1,359 people (20.1%) aged under 15 years, 1,212 (17.9%) aged 15 to 29, 2,949 (43.6%) aged 30 to 64, and 1,248 (18.4%) aged 65 or older.

People could identify as more than one ethnicity. The results were 80.1% European (Pākehā); 24.4% Māori; 5.0% Pasifika; 7.6% Asian; 0.3% Middle Eastern, Latin American and African New Zealanders (MELAA); and 3.0% other, which includes people giving their ethnicity as "New Zealander". English was spoken by 97.1%, Māori by 5.0%, Samoan by 1.4%, and other languages by 7.1%. No language could be spoken by 2.0% (e.g. too young to talk). New Zealand Sign Language was known by 0.3%. The percentage of people born overseas was 14.4, compared with 28.8% nationally.

Religious affiliations were 32.3% Christian, 1.5% Hindu, 0.2% Islam, 1.3% Māori religious beliefs, 0.7% Buddhist, 0.6% New Age, and 1.3% other religions. People who answered that they had no religion were 54.7%, and 7.6% of people did not answer the census question.

Of those at least 15 years old, 777 (14.4%) people had a bachelor's or higher degree, 3,117 (57.6%) had a post-high school certificate or diploma, and 1,518 (28.0%) people exclusively held high school qualifications. The median income was $39,000, compared with $41,500 nationally. 384 people (7.1%) earned over $100,000 compared to 12.1% nationally. The employment status of those at least 15 was 2,718 (50.2%) full-time, 759 (14.0%) part-time, and 156 (2.9%) unemployed.

Individual statistical areas
Name	Area (km^{2})	Population	Density (per km^{2})	Dwellings	Median age	Median income
Solway North	2.08	2,610	1,255	1,050	40.1 years	$37,200
Solway South	6.39	4,164	652	1,593	37.2 years	$40,100
New Zealand					38.1 years	$41,500

== Education ==
Solway School is a co-educational state primary school for Year 1 to 6 students, with a roll of 240 as of July 2026. It opened in 1918.

Hadlow Preparatory School is a co-educational Anglican state-integrated primary school for Year 1 to 8 students, with a roll of 195. It opened in 1929 as a private boys' boarding school.

Solway College is a state-integrated Presbyterian girls' intermediate and secondary school for Year 7 to 13 students, with a roll of 207. It is a boarding school founded in 1916.

== Transport ==
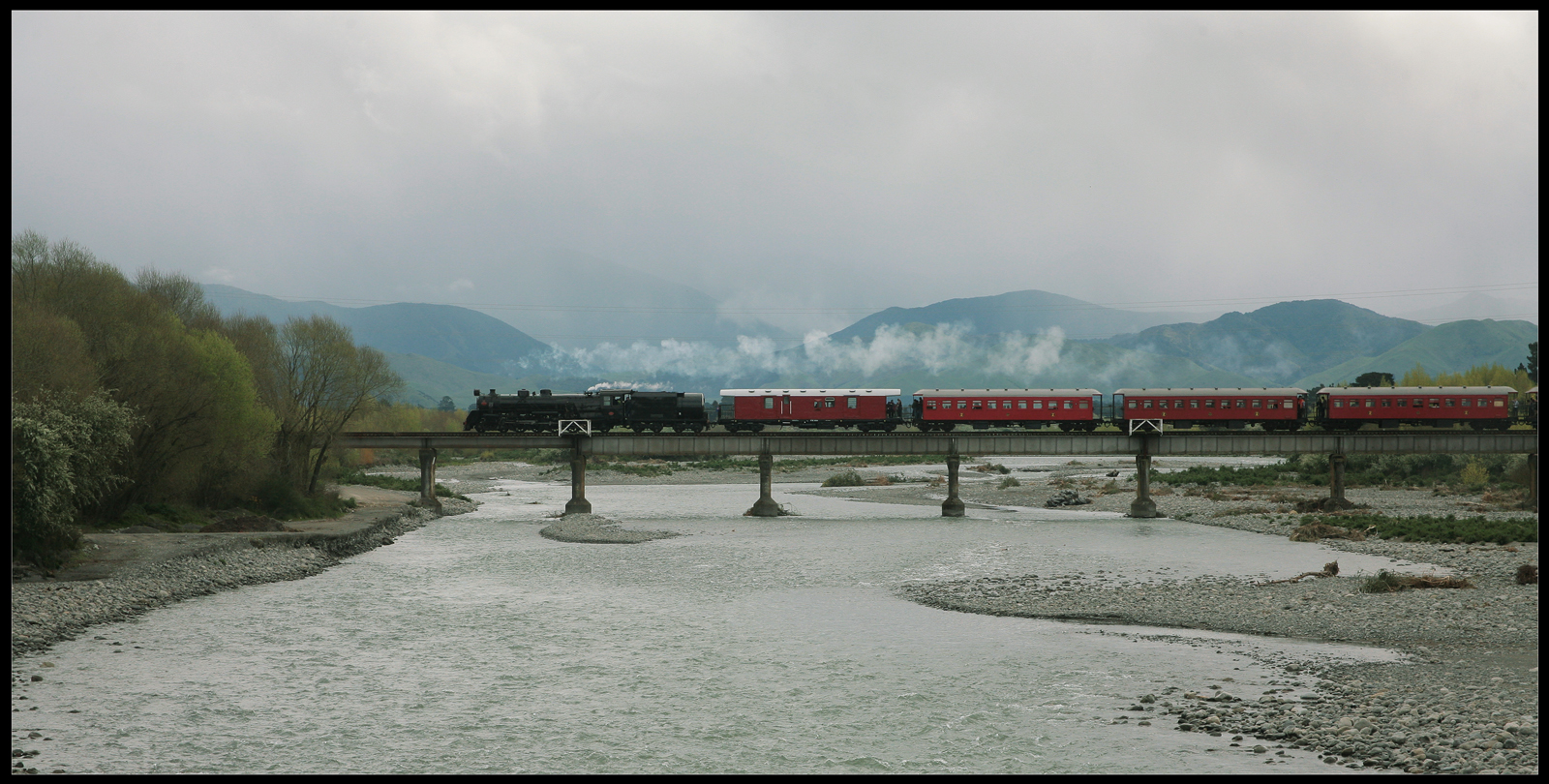
Crossing the Waingawa from Solway to Taratahi

=== Roads and bus services ===
Solway is served by many forms of public transport. State Highway 2 (or High Street), runs straight through the middle of Solway.

There are two bus services serving Solway:

- 200 – To/from central Masterton, Carterton, Greytown, Featherston & Martinborough. Runs all week.
- 202 – Travelling from Central Masterton through Solway and Kuripuni and back again. Runs 4 times daily on weekdays.

=== Rail services ===
Solway connects residents to the cities of Upper Hutt, Lower Hutt and Wellington. Its close proximity to Solway College makes it popular with its students, which board in Masterton and live in Wellington.

=== Hood Aerodrome ===
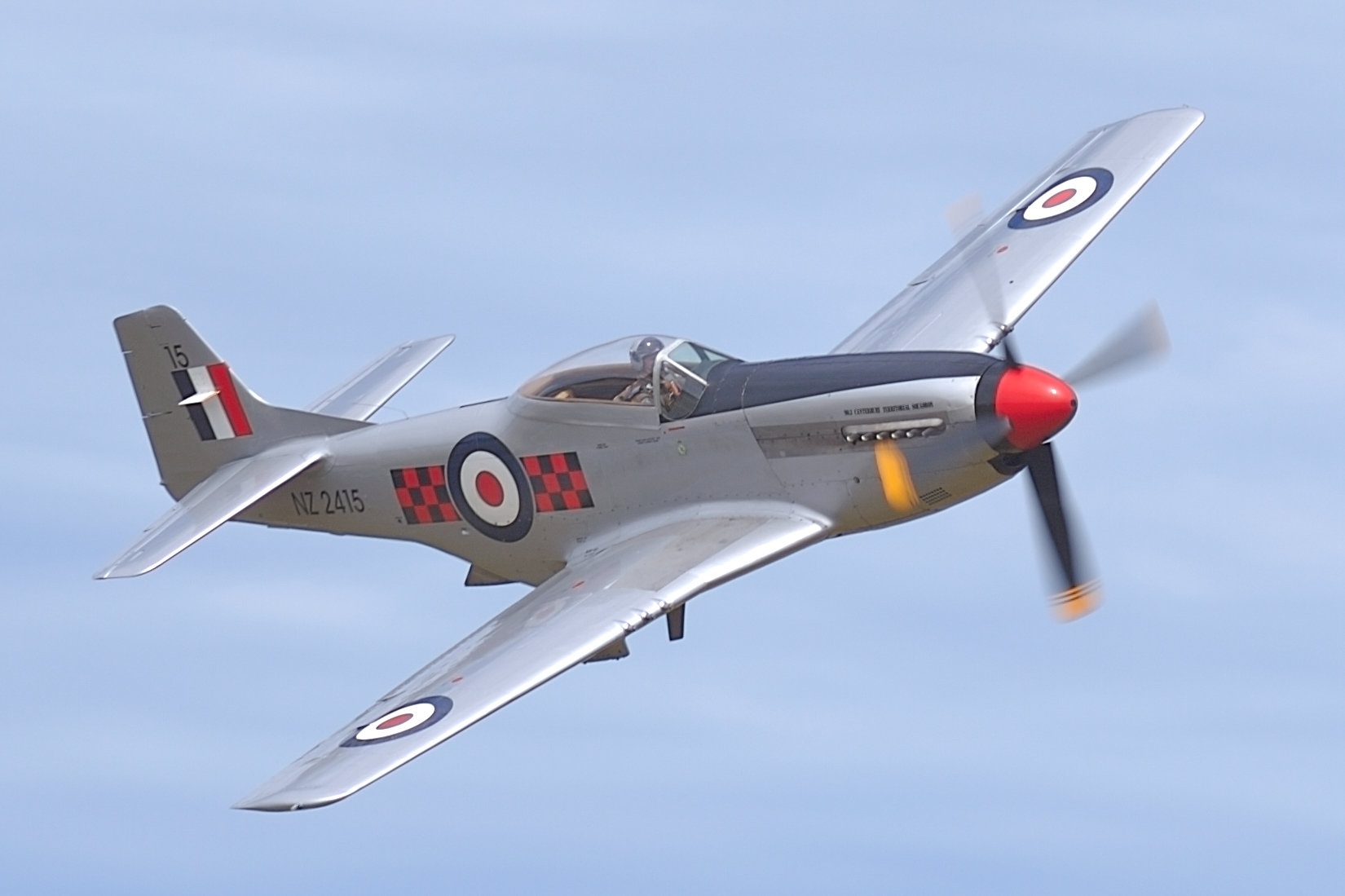
The Wings over Wairarapa Air Show is at Hood Aerodrome

Hood Aerodrome is in Solway though as of 2015, there are no commercial flights from it. From early 2009 until late 2013 Air New Zealand provided flights to Auckland, operated by subsidiary Eagle Airways six days a week, mainly to serve business customers in the Wairarapa. There have been a few other unsuccessful attempts at commercial air travel in Masterton, mostly failing due to its proximity to major airports in Wellington and Palmerston North. The most significant was by South Pacific Airlines of New Zealand (SPANZ), which operated daily flights using DC3s during the sixties to destinations nationwide until the airline's closure in 1966.

Peter Jackson is an avid aviation enthusiast and owns a collection of over 40 flyable World War I-era warbirds housed at Solway's Hood Aerodrome.
