= Cobblestone Museum =

Cobblestone Museum may refer to:

- Cobblestones Museum in Greytown, New Zealand
- Cobblestone Farm and Museum, in Ann Arbor, Michigan
- Cobblestone Society and Museum, in Gaines, New York, in the Cobblestone Historic District
- Howland Cobblestone Store, also known as the Howland Stone Store Museum, in Scipio, New York
- Tinker Cobblestone Farmstead, also known as the Tinker Homestead Museum, in Henrietta, New York
