= Pat Evison =

New Zealand actress (1924–2010)

Dame Pat Evison DBE
- Pat Evison as Jessie Windom in TV series Prisoner also known as Prisoner: Cell Block H
- Born: Helen June Patricia Blamires; 2 June 1924; Dunedin, New Zealand
- Died: 30 May 2010 (aged 85); Wellington, New Zealand
- Education: Solway College; Victoria University of Wellington; Auckland College of Education; Old Vic
- Occupation: Actress
- Years active: 1947–1998
- Spouse: Roger Evison (m. 1948)
- Relatives: Ernest Blamires (father); Edgar Blamires (uncle); Henry Blamires (uncle)

Dame Helen June Patricia Evison (née Blamires; 2 June 1924 – 30 May 2010), known professionally as Pat Evison, was a New Zealand-born actress.

== Early life and education ==
Evison was born in Dunedin, New Zealand, on 2 June 1924, the daughter of first-class cricketer and clergyman Ernest Oswald Blamires and Annie Blamires (née Anderson). She was educated at Solway College in Masterton. She attended Victoria University College, Auckland University College and the Auckland Teachers' Training College. In the 1940s, she became one of the first New Zealand students to be awarded a scholarship to the Old Vic Theatre Centre in London, where she studied directing. She then worked as an assistant director at the Young Vic, before returning to New Zealand where she worked as a freelance director and actor at the Downstage Theatre in Wellington.

== Acting career ==
Evison first began acting while studying an arts degree at Victoria University, performing in radio plays recorded onto acetate discs. Following her return to New Zealand from London, she began acting in television roles, with a small role in the television play All Earth to Love, and guest appearances and a regular role on the sketch comedy series In View of the Circumstances.

In 1971, Evison starred in the television drama serial Pukemanu as storekeeper Phyllis Telford, a role written specially for her by series creator Julian Dickon. In her 1998 autobiography Happy Days in Muckle Flugga, Evison stated that the role as Mrs Telford changed her life, and she was thereafter recognised throughout New Zealand as "Mrs Pukemanu". Evison also starred in the first production at Palmerston North's Centrepoint Theatre in 1973, An Evening With Katherine Mansfield.

She is likely best known for her roles in Australian television, such as Jessie Windom in Prisoner and Violet Carnegie in The Flying Doctors.

== Honours and awards ==
In 1979, Evison won the Australian Film Institute Award for Best Supporting Actress, for her role as Mel Gibson's character's mother in the film Tim. Her co-stars also won AFI Awards for their roles: Gibson winning Best Lead Actor for the title role, and Alwyn Kurts winning Best Supporting Actor for his role as Tim's father.

In the 1980 Queen's Birthday Honours, Evison was appointed an Officer of the Order of the British Empire, for services to the theatre. She was promoted to Dame Commander of the Order of the British Empire in the 1993 New Year Honours, for services to theatre, television and the community.

== Personal life ==
She married Roger Douglas Evison in 1948, and the couple went on to have three children.

Evison suffered from numerous health problems in her later years including cancer, diabetes, several minor strokes and arthritis.

Pat Evison died in Wellington, New Zealand, on 30 May 2010, aged 85.

== Filmography ==
=== Film ===
| Year | Title | Role | Notes |
|---|---|---|---|
| 1975 | Landfall | Visitor | Feature film |
| 1976 | Caddie | Mrs. Norris | Feature film |
| 1979 | Tim | Em Melville | Feature film |
| 1979 | The Old Man's Story | Aunt | Short |
| 1975 | They Don't Clap Losers | Granny | TV movie |
| 1980 | The Earthling | Meg Neilson | Feature film |
| 1981 | Bad Blood | Dulcie Lindsay | Feature film |
| 1982 | Starstruck | Nana | Feature film |
| 1982 | The Clinic | Alda | Feature film |
| 1984 | The Silent One | Luisa | |
| 1985 | A Street to Die | Sister Sweet | Feature film |
| 1985 | Hanging Together | Jean | TV movie |
| 1987 | Emma's War | Miss Arnott | Feature film |
| 1990 | What the Moon Saw | Gran | Feature film |
| 1992 | Grampire | Leah | |

=== Television ===
| Year | Title | Role | Notes |
|---|---|---|---|
| 1971–72 | Pukemanu | Phyllis Telford | 8 episodes |
| 1974 | Percy the Policeman | Washer Woman | Episode: "Percy Meets Burglar Bill" |
| 1974 | Percy the Policeman | Mrs. Jones | Episode: "Percy and the Burglaries" |
| 1975 | Division 4 | Agnes | Episode: "Agnes Triumphant" |
| 1976 | Matlock Police | Chrissy Wilson | Episode: "Just Like the Old Days" |
| 1976 | Solo One | Mrs. Birch | Episode: "Little Joe" |
| 1976 | The Emigrants | Josie | TV series; 1 episode: "13,000 Miles Away" |
| 1977 | Pig in a Poke | | TV series |
| 1978–1980 | Close to Home | Faith Wilson | 3 episodes |
| 1979 | The Mike Walsh Show | Guest - Herself with Alwyn Kurts | TV series, 1 episode |
| 1981 | A Town Like Alice | Mrs. Collard | Miniseries; 1 episode |
| 1983 | Carson's Law | Mrs. Amelia Henty | Episode: "Teapots and Tears" |
| 1985–88 | The Flying Doctors | Violet Carnegie | 3 episodes (miniseries), 53 episodes (regular series) |
| 1986 | Prisoner | Jessie Windom | 28 episodes |
| 1990 | The Ray Bradbury Theatre | Mrs. Foley | Episode: "The Black Ferris" |
| 1990 | Shark in the Park | Vi Scudmore | Episode: "Double or Quits" |

== Bibliography ==
- Autobiography: Evison, Pat (1998). Happy days in Muckle Flugga. HarperCollins. ISBN 1-86950-267-1.
