= Masterton railway station =

Railway station in New Zealand

Masterton
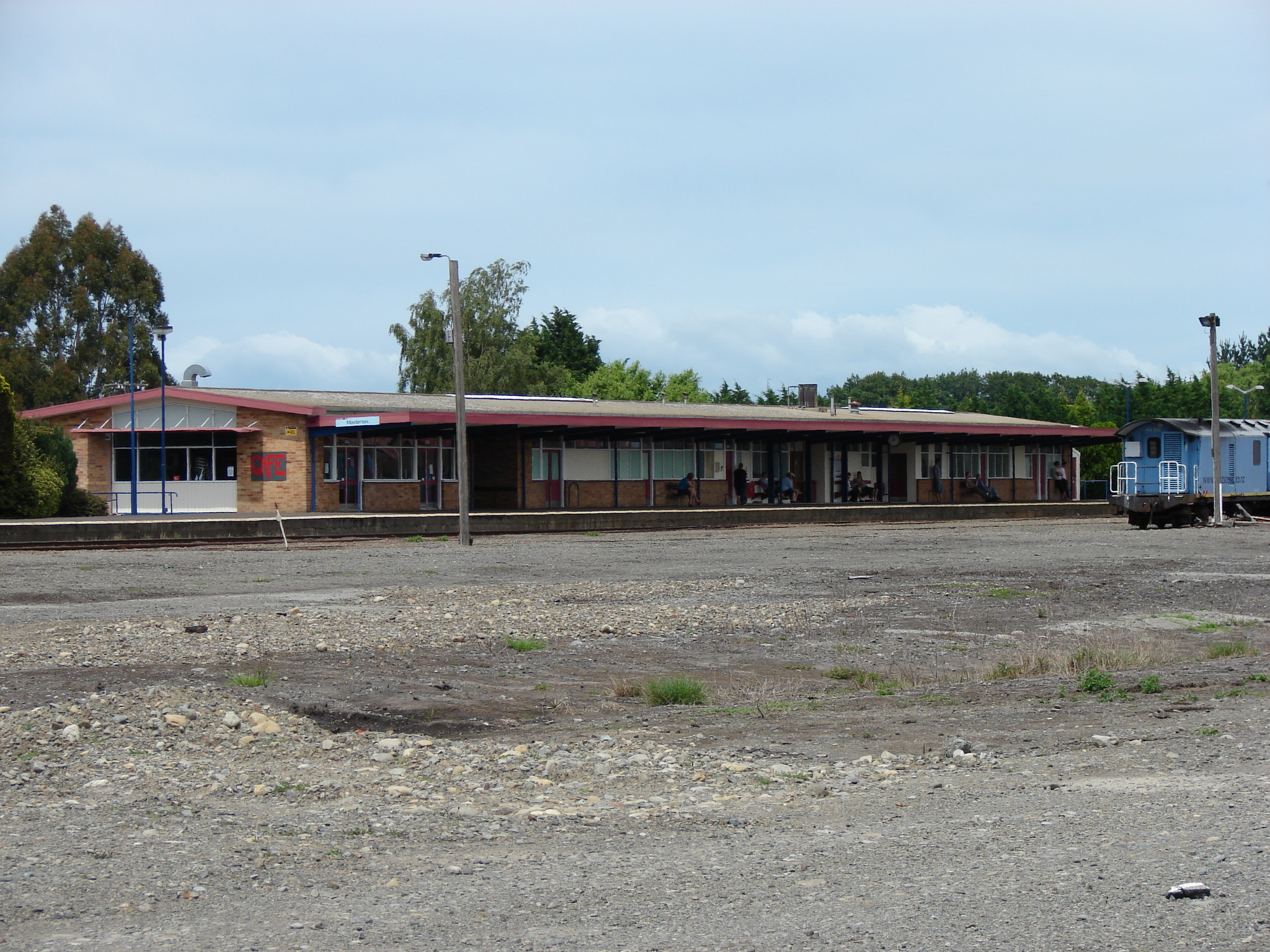

General information
- Location: Perry Street, Masterton, New Zealand
- Coordinates: 40°56.420′S 175°39.321′E
- Elevation: 115 metres (377 ft)
- System: Metlink regional rail
- Owner: Greater Wellington Regional Council
- Line: Wairarapa Line
- Distance: 90.96 kilometres (56.52 mi) from Wellington
- Platforms: Single side
- Tracks: 1 mainline; 1 loop; 6 row sidings (3 in carriage fence area)
- Train operators: Transdev Wellington

Construction
- Structure type: At-grade
- Parking: Yes
- Cycle facilities: Yes
- Architect: George Troup (1904 building); Ivan Clarkson (1967 station)
- Architectural style: Vogel-era Special Class (1880 building); Vintage Troup (1904 building); Mid-century modern (1967 station)

Other information
- Station code: MAST
- Fare zone: 14

History
- Opened: 1 November 1880; 145 years ago
- Rebuilt: 1967; 59 years ago

Services
Preceding station	Transdev Wellington	Following station
Terminus	Wairarapa Connection	Renall Street towards Wellington
Location
- Location within New Zealand
Notes
- Previous Station: Renall Street Station; Next Station: Opaki Station

Masterton railway station is a single-platform, urban railway station serving the town of Masterton in New Zealand's Wairarapa district. Located at the end of Perry Street, it is one of three stations in Masterton, the others being Renall Street and Solway. Masterton station is the terminus for Wairarapa Connection passenger services on Metlink's Wairarapa Line from and to Wellington. The average journey time to Wellington is one hour and forty-three minutes.

The station building has a ticket office and café (both now closed); the yard has working freight-handling facilities, a goods shed, a turntable, and engine/railcar shed.

With the introduction of the New Zealand BEMU class electric multiple unit from 2030 for passenger services from Wellington, they will have charging points at the station. Alstom will establish a 4000-square-meter maintenance depot for the BEMUs, with a staff of thirty and three servive and maintenance tracks.

== History ==
The original Masterton station was erected in 1880 and included a goods shed, sheep and cattle yards, and an engine shed with coal and water facilities. In 1894 a windmill and pump were installed to improve the supply of water for locomotive and station use. In 1897 a turntable was installed. In 1904 a replacement station was opened, designed by George Troup, which included the addition of refreshment rooms. In 1954 a new 55-foot (17 m) turntable was installed, followed two years later by a railcar shed.

Following the introduction of diesel-electric locomotives in 1955, the engine shed was used by the Way and Works Branch until it became surplus and was demolished. But the water tanks remained in place until their removal in November 1968.

In 1965, a new freight yard and goods shed were established to the west of the original one, followed by the September 1967 opening of a new station building (the present-day structure). The sheep and cattle yards were removed in August 1969.

== Services ==
In its early years, the Napier Express passed through Masterton station before being re-routed along the west coast when the Wellington and Manawatu Railway Company's line was purchased in December 1908. Later, Masterton was a through station for passenger services between Palmerston North/Woodville and Wellington, such as the steam-era Wairarapa Mail and subsequent services operated by NZR RM class Wairarapa, Standard, and 88 seater railcars. But because of insufficient patronage, through trains between Palmerston North and Masterton officially ceased on Monday, 1 August 1988, with the last services running on Friday, 29 July 1988.

Presently, Masterton is served by the scheduled Wairarapa Connection train, which operates between Wellington and Masterton. There are five such services both ways Monday to Thursday, six services on Fridays, and two services each way on Saturdays and Sundays. There are also a number of weekday freight services to/from Wellington, usually to the Juken Nissho timber mill just south at Waingawa, with the locomotive regularly turned on the turntable.

There are no timetable services north of Masterton. Previously, a Sunday service existed between Wellington and Palmerston North via Masterton, but has been discontinued.

== Gallery ==
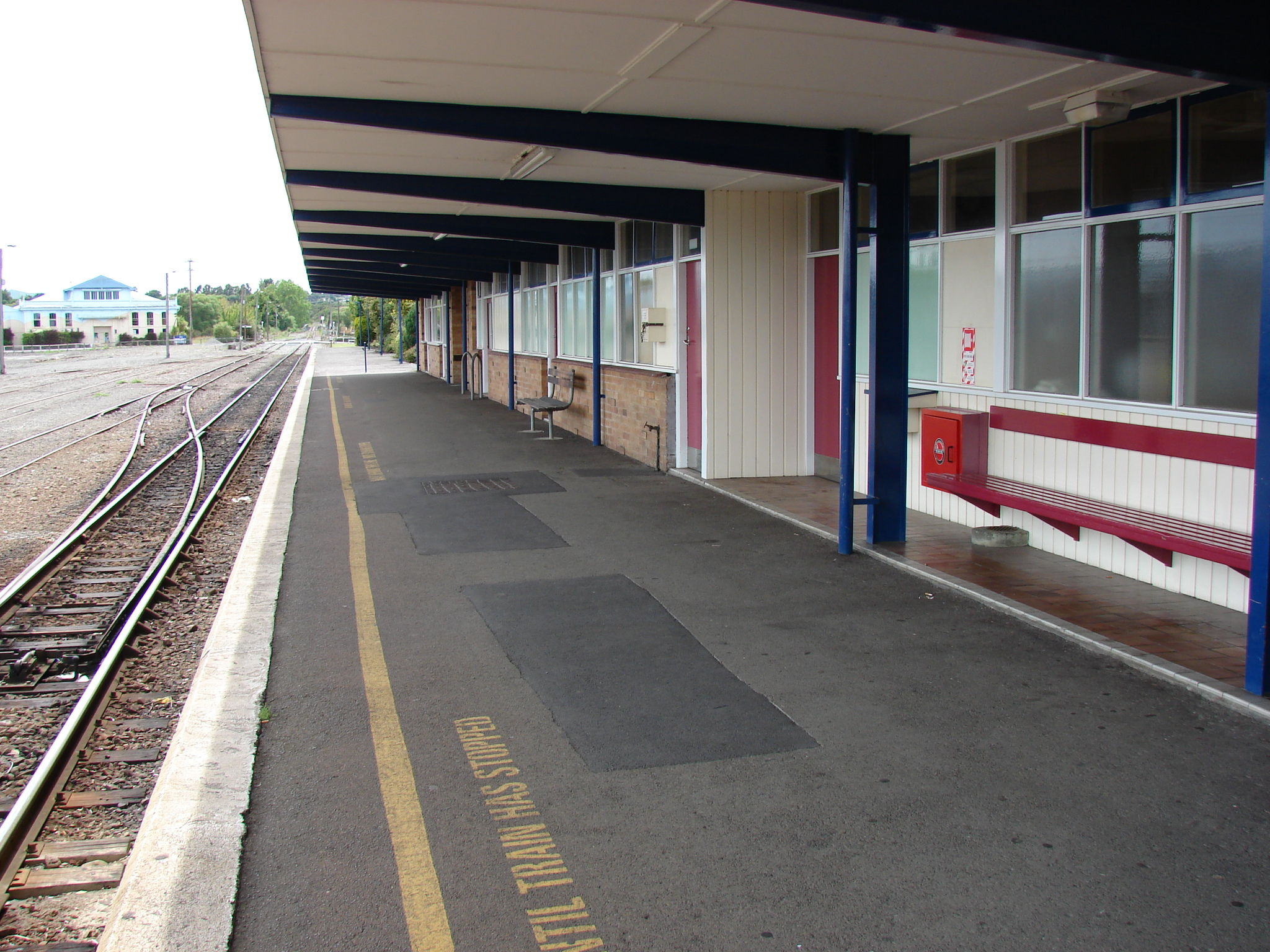
Station platform, looking north-east.

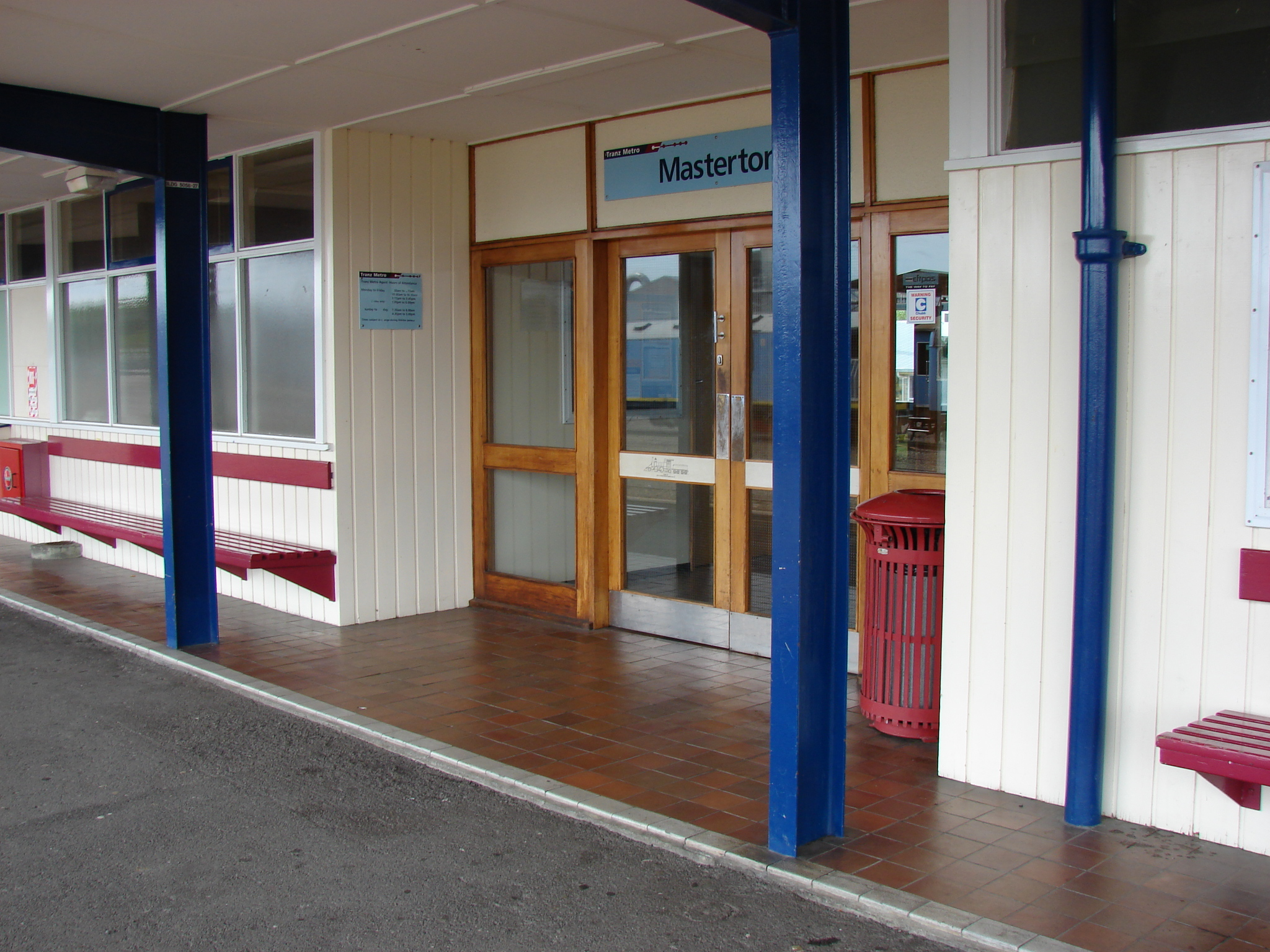
Entrance to foyer and ticket office, and access to car park.

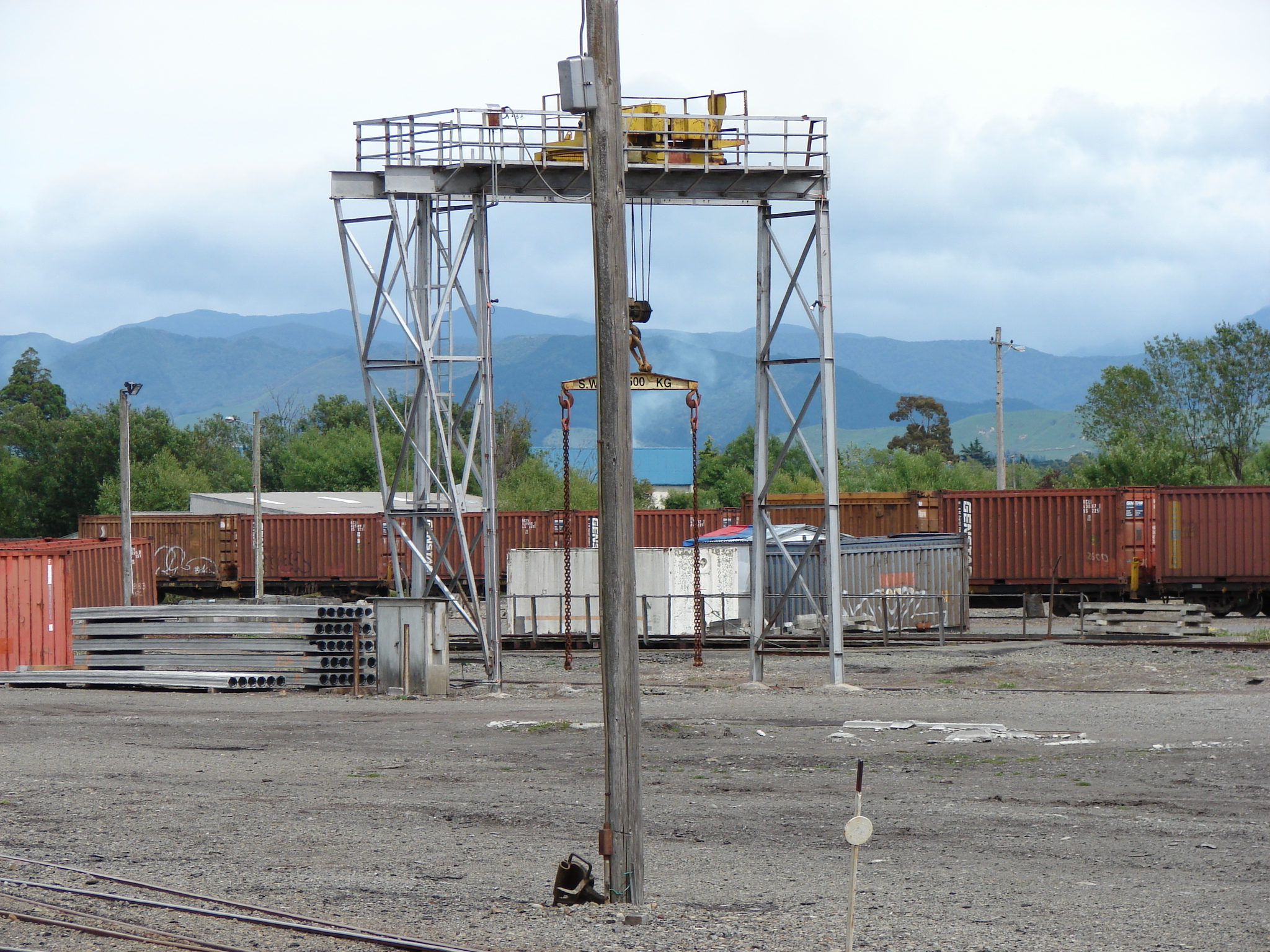
Container crane.

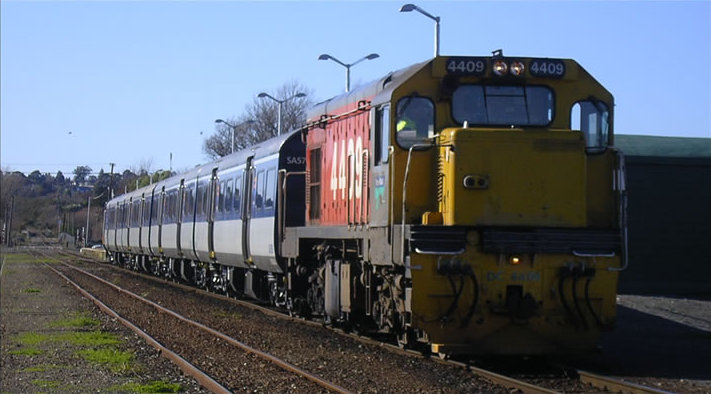
Auckland SD Set on test run.

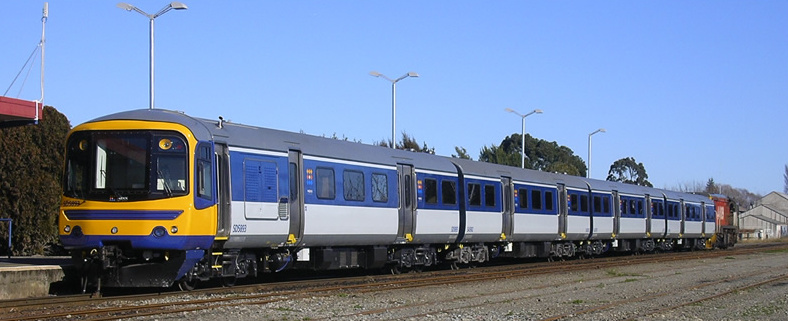
Auckland SD Set on test run.
