= Jane Annie Collier =

New Zealand teacher of the blind and church worker

Jane Annie Collier (28 September 1869–13 October 1955) was a New Zealand teacher of the blind and church worker. She was born in Springston, North Canterbury, New Zealand on 28 September 1869.

Collier married Henry Blamires, a Methodist minister and cricketer, in Auckland in March 1900. They had three children.
