= NZMS =

NZMS may stand for:

- Hood Aerodrome, in Masterton, New Zealand, an aerodrome with ICAO code NZMS
- New Zealand Mathematical Society
- New Zealand Meteorological Service, the predecessor to MetService
- New Zealand Mapping Service, a predecessor to Land Information New Zealand, and the maps produced by them
- Identity numbers for manuscripts in the Auckland Libraries
