= Blamire =

Blamire is a surname thought to derive from a lost or unidentified place in Cumberland or Westmorland. The place-name appears to contain Middle English blaa, from Old Scandinavian blar ("blue", "livid", or "dark"), together with mire, from Old Scandinavian myrr ("moor").

Notable people by that name include:

- Jamie Blamire (born 1997), English rugby player
- Larry Blamire, American filmmaker
- Robert Blamire, English musician
- Susanna Blamire (1747–1794), English poet
- William Blamire (1790–1862), English farmer and politician

== See also ==
- Blamire family
- Blamires, surname
