= Marion Thompson =

New Zealand educator (1877–1964)

Marion Beatrice Thompson (22 November 1877 in Dunedin, New Zealand – 12 June 1964) was one of a distinguished group of University of Otago women graduates of the 1890s who put their mark on girls' education in New Zealand in the new century. She is most noted in her career as the founding principal of Solway College, Masterton, from 1916 through to her retirement in 1942.

== Education, family and early career ==
Marion Thompson, MA, 1929

Marion Thompson completed her teacher training in 1898 at the Dunedin Teachers' College and received her MA with first class honours in 1899. For the next decade she taught in a number of schools around New Zealand, six years of it at Prince Albert College, Auckland. In 1909 she married Reverend Laurence Thompson, turning her attention to raising a family in Carterton, where her husband was minister of the Presbyterian church.

== Teaching career ==
Her thoughts returned to teaching in late 1914 after Rev Thompson fell seriously ill. She rejected several positions offered at established girls' schools to pursue an idea suggested by her brother-in-law Rev A. T. Thompson. He had for some time been considering establishment of a boys' school in the Wairarapa, believing that "the activities of the Church could profitably be extended into the educational world.". As Mrs Thompson's teaching experience to date had been mainly in girls' schools, Rev. Thompson agreed to enlist community support for a girls' school instead.

The school opened in 1916 in Solway House, the old homestead of a large Wairarapa estate, with a roll of 21. The following year it grew to 61. The Rev. Thompson's return to health enabled both to play an active role in creating a solid foundation of community support for the school and life-education for its students.

Marion Thompson's approach to operation of a girls' boarding school was outlined in a speech to the General Assembly of the Presbyterian church in Auckland in 1915, expressing her hope that "with our family life at its centre, Solway College would have the atmosphere of a home rather than an institution." The school functioned with a disciplinary system absent of fines or detentions, and Mrs Thompson's teaching approach was to establish "activities that rounded off the angularity of the class-room, and made for fullness of living to counteract the popular opinion that young people should be educated to earn a living." The concept of holistic education endures as a pillar of Solway College's teaching philosophy to this day.

Ironically, the pursuit of a school as a family took its toll on Marion Thompson's personal life. In her later years, she admitted that the school had absorbed her life to the exclusion of family, church and her own social and cultural interests. She was a tireless worker in all areas of the school, often out of necessity due to frequent staff turnover or lack of availability through the war years. She also battled throughout her career to earn the respect of the guarantors and board of governors, who she believed at the outset were 'parsimonious and patronising', treating her as 'a penniless woman with a very sick husband and two small sons' whom they were benevolently providing with a means of livelihood.

In 1942, resignation was forced upon her by failing eyesight, a condition evident since the mid-1930s but which had not improved despite a major operation. She published her memoirs in 1956, living out her final years with her daughter until her death in 1964. She described her time at Solway College as 'an experiment on a small scale', but one which she herself, ex-pupils, boards of governors and educators have acknowledged as successful and enduring.
