= Wings Over Wairarapa =

Biennual air show in New Zealand

Wings Over Wairarapa is a biennial air show at the Hood Aerodrome in Masterton, New Zealand, that has been taking place since 1999. The airshow is typically held over 3 days. The airshow often features aircraft and pilots from the New Zealand Warbirds association (NZWA) which is based at Ardmore Airport. The NZDF is also often present, with displays by the Black Falcons and other Royal New Zealand Air Force aircraft, such as the air force heritage flight. The Royal New Zealand Army is also a major participant, with many ground exhibits and interactive tents.

== History ==
The festival was founded in 1999 by Tom Williams and the Sport & Vintage Aviation Society. In 2011 the Wings Over Wairarapa Over Charitable Trust was established, which assumed formal stewardship of the festival.

A B-52 Stratofortress was scheduled to attend the show in 2019, but was cancelled last minute due to a maintenance issue, and was grounded in Australia following the flight from Guam. It featured in the 2021 show for the first time.

== Gallery ==
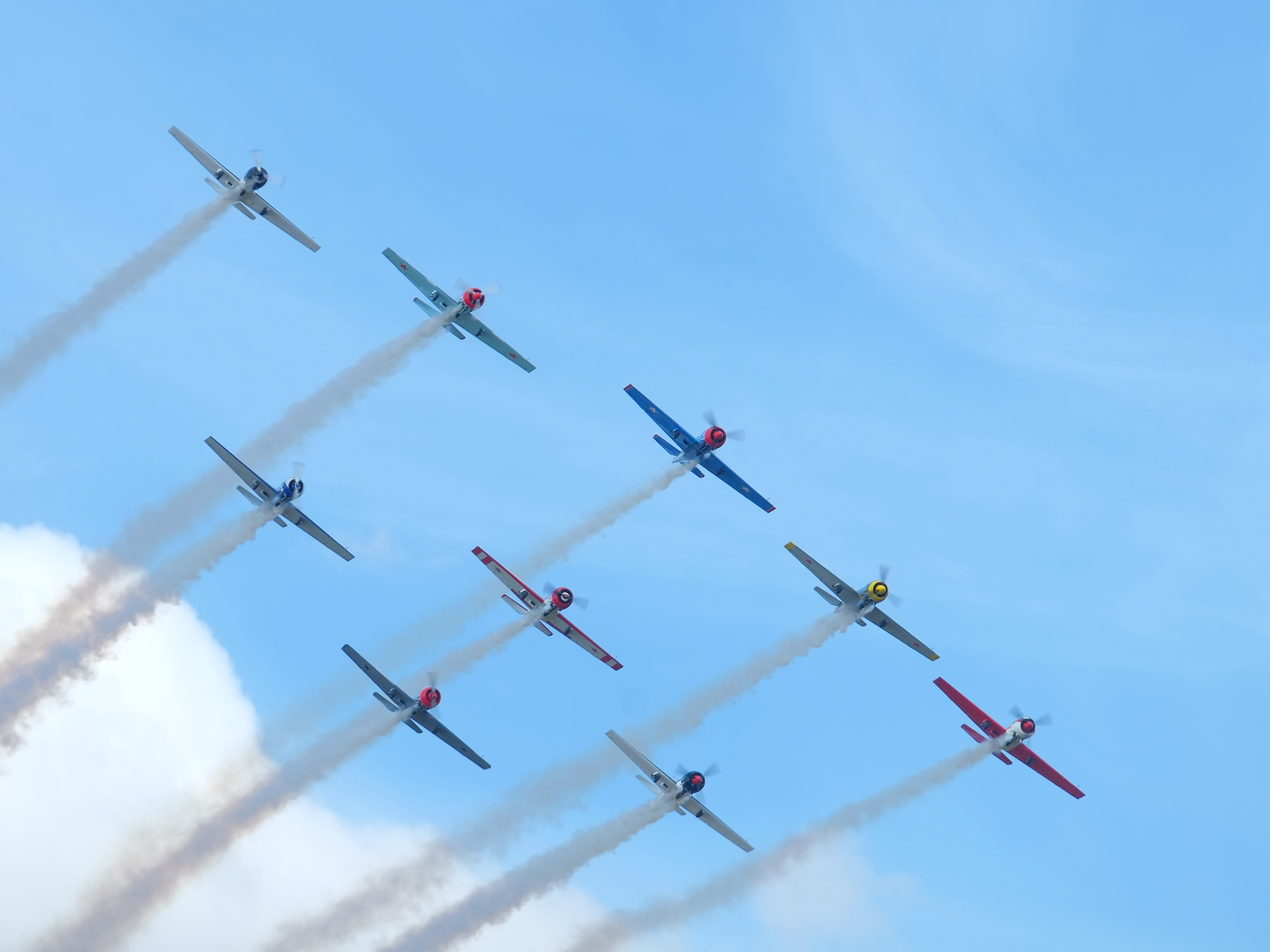
Nine Yakovlev Yak-52s approaching in formation flight (2021)

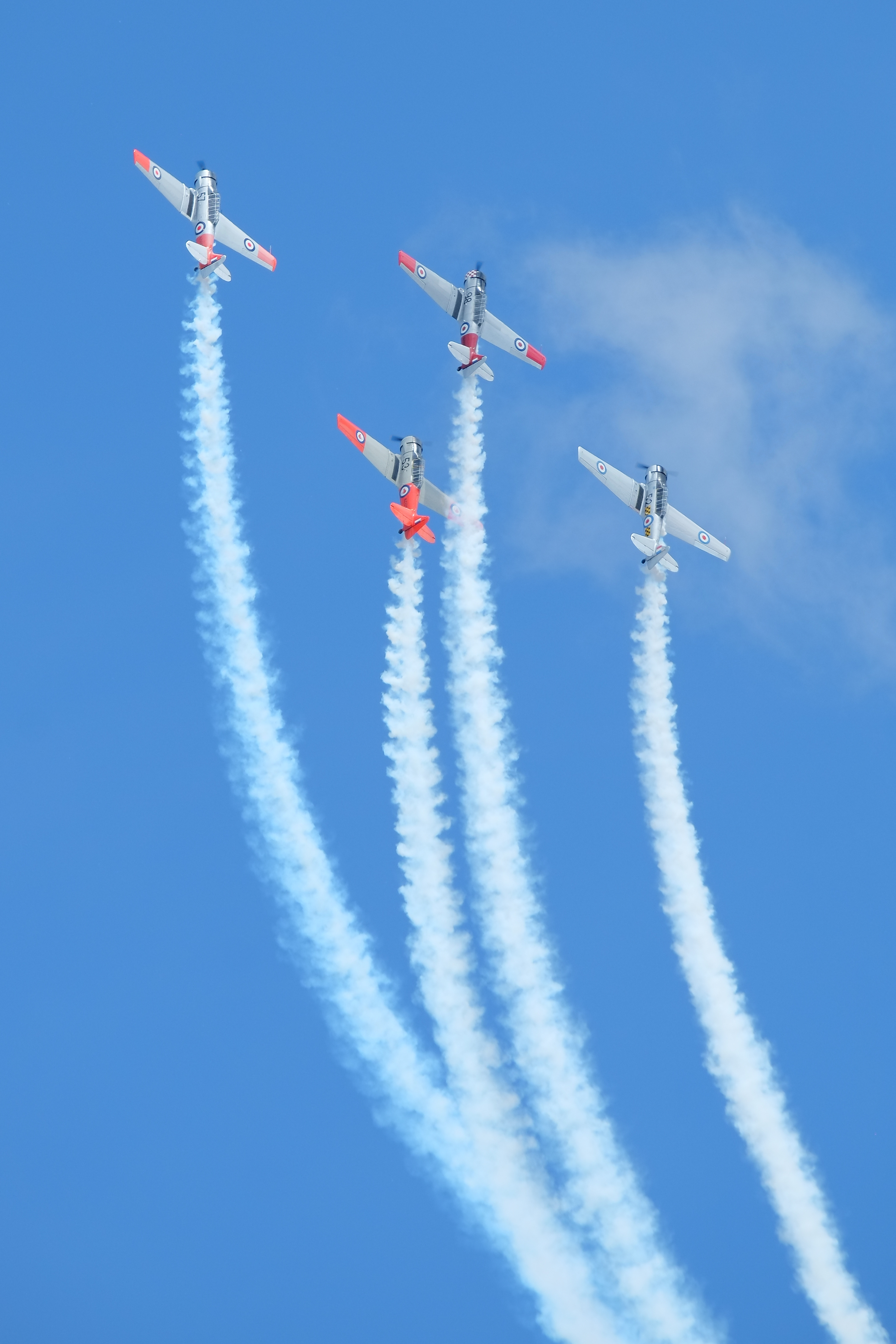
Four North American NA-88 Harvards climbing vertically into a loop (2021)

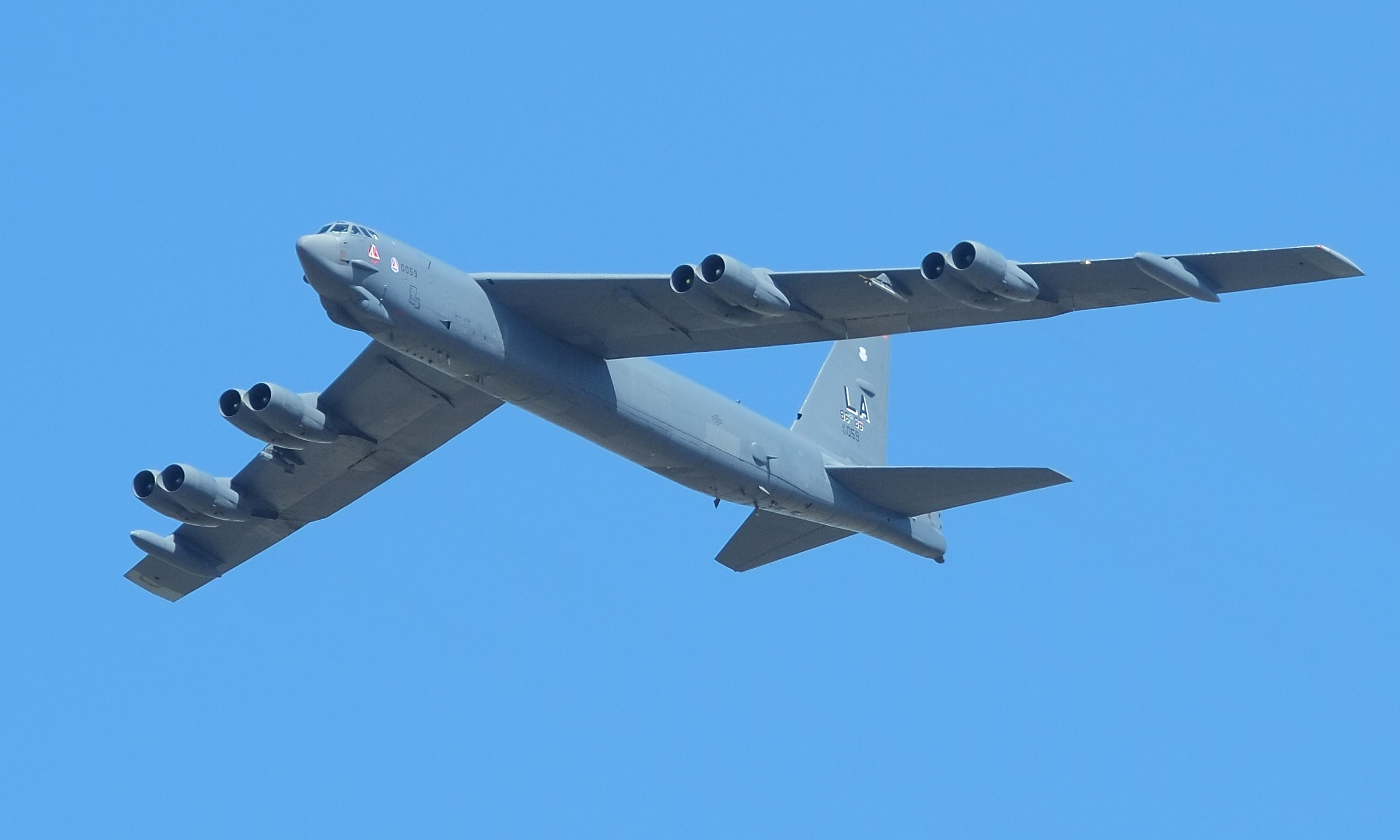
Boeing B-52 Stratofortress (2021)
