= Renall Street railway station =

Railway station in New Zealand

Renall Street
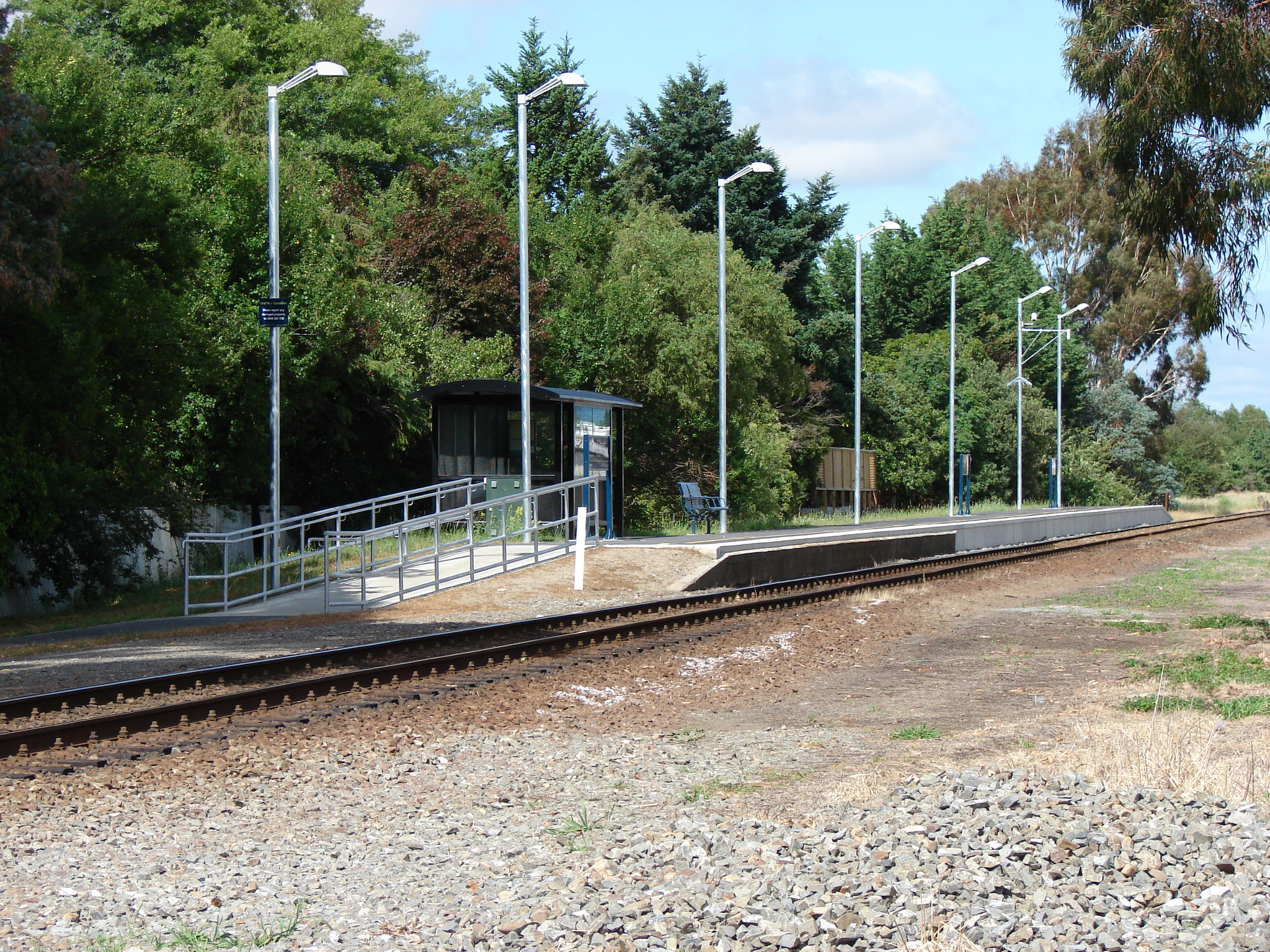
- Renall Street railway station in 2007.

General information
- Location: Renall Street, Masterton, New Zealand
- Coordinates: 40°56.856′S 175°38.322′E
- System: Metlink regional rail
- Owner: Greater Wellington Regional Council
- Line: Wairarapa Line
- Distance: 89.4 kilometres (55.6 mi) from Wellington
- Platforms: Single side
- Tracks: Main line (1)
- Train operators: Transdev Wellington
- Bus routes: 1
- Bus operators: Tranzit Coachlines
- Connections: 201 Masterton West

Construction
- Structure type: At-grade
- Parking: No
- Cycle facilities: No

Other information
- Station code: RENA
- Fare zone: 14

History
- Opened: October 1936; 89 years ago
- Closed: 25 June 1978; 48 years ago (freight)
- Rebuilt: May–July 2007; 19 years ago
- Former names: Upper Plains crossing

Services
Preceding station	Transdev Wellington	Following station
Masterton Terminus	Wairarapa Connection	Solway towards Wellington
Location
Notes
- Previous Station: Solway Station; Next Station: Masterton Station

Renall Street railway station is an urban single-platform railway station on Renall Street in the Wairarapa town of Masterton in New Zealand’s North Island. Renall Street is one of three railway stations in Masterton, the others being Masterton and Solway.

The Wairarapa Connection serves the station several times daily with services to Wellington and Masterton.

As part of the Wairarapa station upgrade programme to prepare stations for the new SW-class passenger carriages, this station was closed from 14 May 2007 until early July 2007.

== History ==
As the construction of the Wairarapa Line progressed in 1880, the rails reached the "Upper Plains crossing" in late August 1880. On 28 August a special train conveyed members of parliament and their families from Wellington to the "Upper Plains crossing" where some picnicked, while others were taken by coach into town to refresh themselves at a hotel.

In 1936, Renall Street became a stopping place for railcars, coinciding with the introduction of the Wairarapa railcars. Despite strong public support, it was not until 1937 that a shelter and platform were provided at the Upper Plains crossing. The station also had several private sidings serving oil companies and other industrial interests. These sidings have been removed.

== Connecting Services ==
A nearby bus stop allows passengers to connect with bus Route 201 (Masterton West) to the town centre.

== Gallery ==
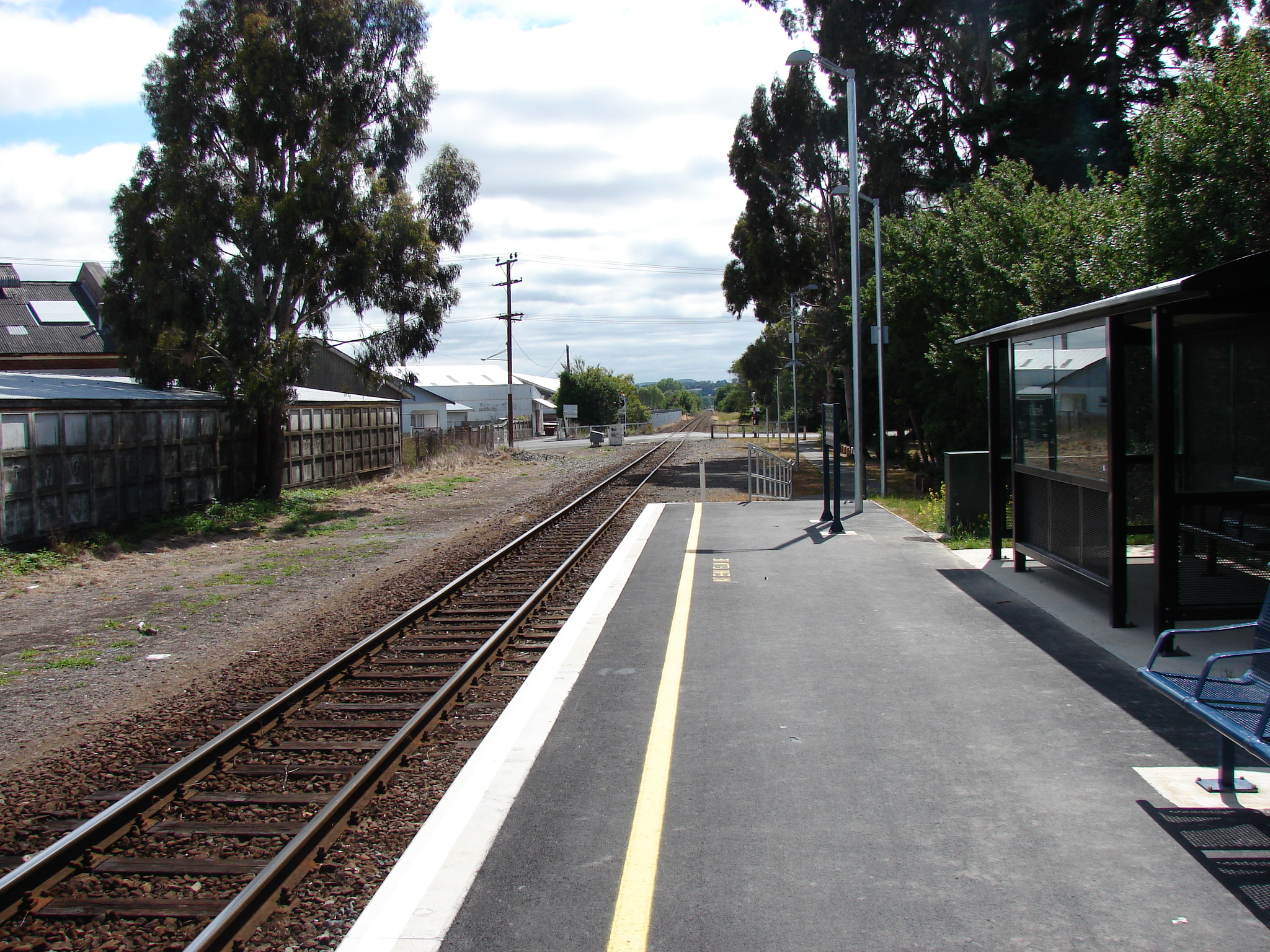
Looking north-east in the direction of Masterton from Renall Street station.

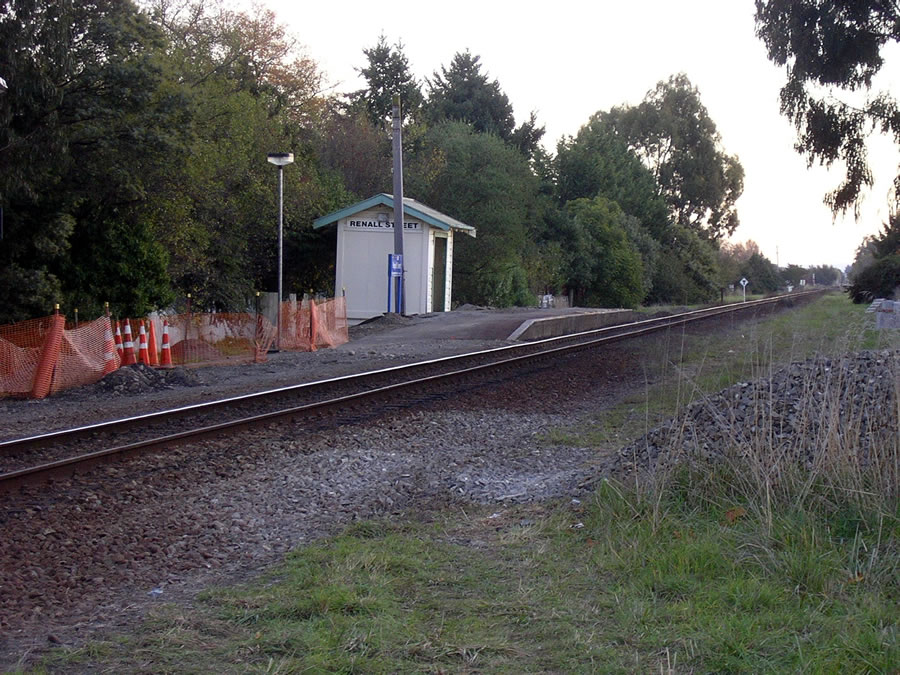
Station just before 2007 re-build

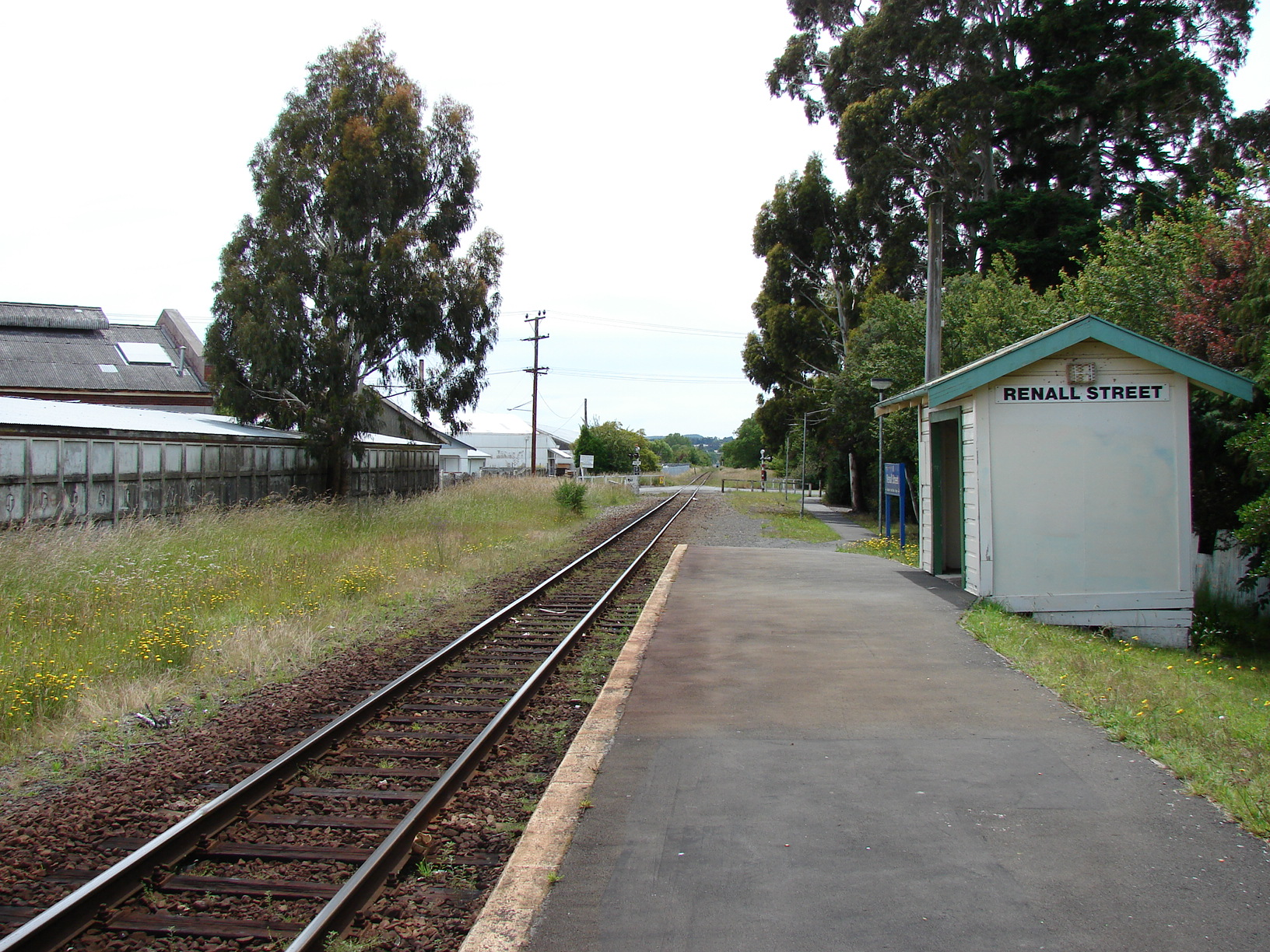
Station and platform looking north-east at the Renall Street level crossing and in the direction of Masterton, before rebuild
