= Solway railway station =

Railway station in New Zealand

Solway
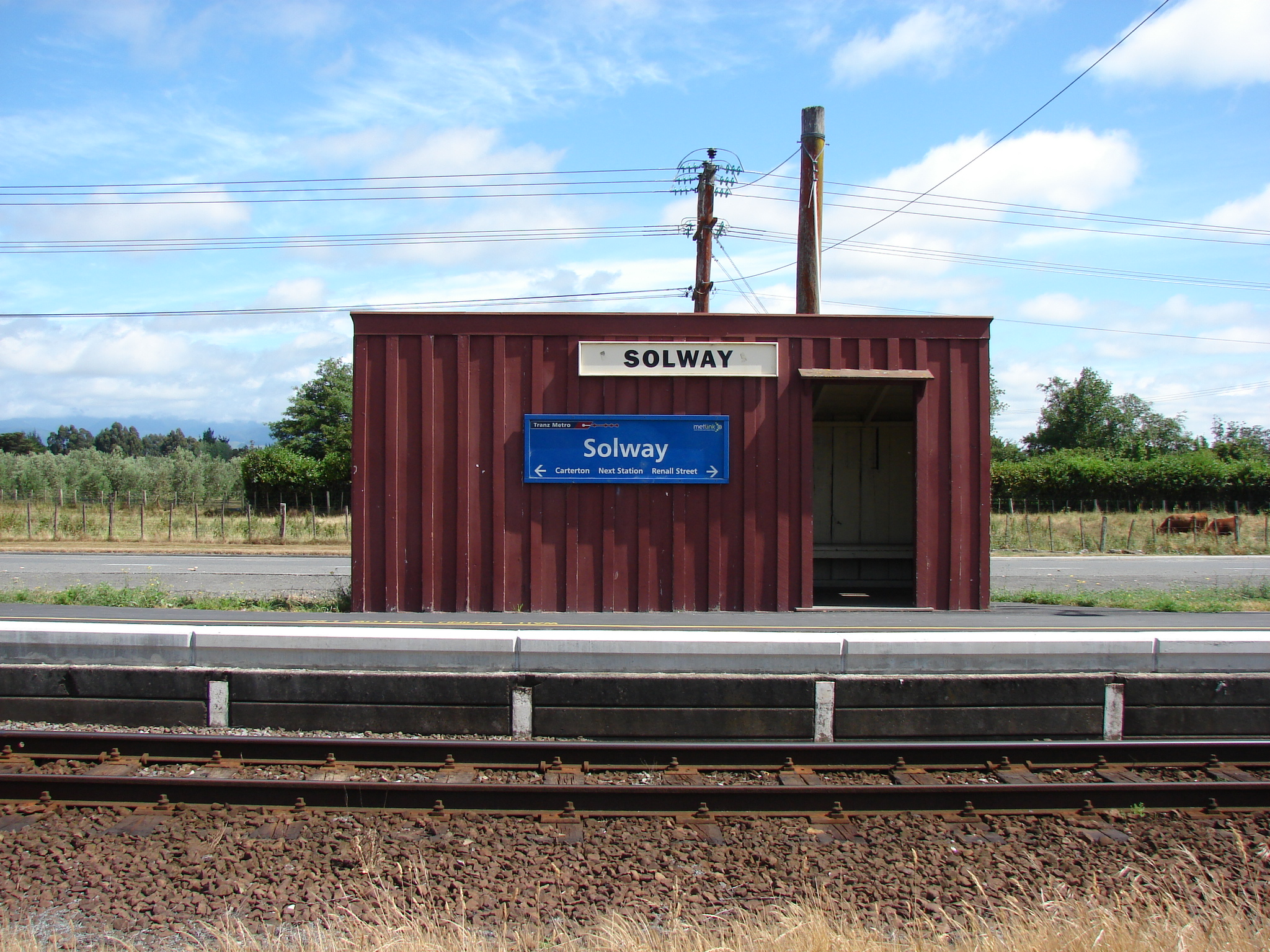
- Historic station shelter

General information
- Location: Ngaumutawa Road, Solway, Masterton, New Zealand
- Coordinates: 40°57′11.94″S 175°37′30.72″E
- Elevation: 124 metres (407 ft)
- System: Metlink regional rail
- Owner: Greater Wellington Regional Council
- Line: Wairarapa Line
- Distance: 88.09 kilometres (54.74 mi) from Wellington
- Platforms: Single side
- Tracks: 1 main line
- Train operators: Transdev Wellington

Construction
- Structure type: At-grade
- Parking: Yes
- Cycle facilities: No
- Architectural style: Vogel class 6

Other information
- Station code: SOLW
- Fare zone: 14

History
- Opened: 1 November 1880; 145 years ago
- Closed: 13 October 1986; 39 years ago (freight)
- Rebuilt: 2007; 19 years ago
- Former names: Kurupuni, Purakau

Services
Preceding station	Transdev Wellington	Following station
Renall Street towards Masterton	Wairarapa Connection	Carterton towards Wellington
Location
Notes
- Previous Station: Waingawa Station; Next Station: Renall Street Station

Solway railway station is a suburban railway station serving Solway and the southern end of Masterton, New Zealand. The station is located on the Wairarapa Line, 88.1 km (54.7 mi) north of Wellington and 2.9 km (1.8 mi) south of Masterton.

The station has a single track served by a four-car platform on the Ngaumutawa Road side. The Wairarapa Connection serves the station several times daily with services to Wellington and Masterton.

As part of the Wairarapa station upgrade programme to prepare stations for the SW-class passenger carriages, this station was upgraded between 14 May 2007 and late August 2007.

== History ==
When the station was opened along with the line to Masterton on 1 November 1880 it had only a shelter and platform. It was originally named Kurupuni and was located south of Masterton. Later, the station was briefly known as Purakau between 1908 and 1912 when it was renamed Solway. The station was never regarded as being of any great importance but did also handle freight until 1986 with customers including the Wairarapa Electric Power Board and a fertiliser company.

A new car park was built at the station in 2001 by the Masterton District Council as part of a regional programme to "Enhance and expand urban public passenger transport facilities and services".

In 2006, it was proposed that the historic Class 6 station shelter shed at Solway be removed to a fenced yard at Carterton Station to make way for a new shelter and the platform improvements. After concern was expressed by local residents the plan was rescinded.

== Gallery ==
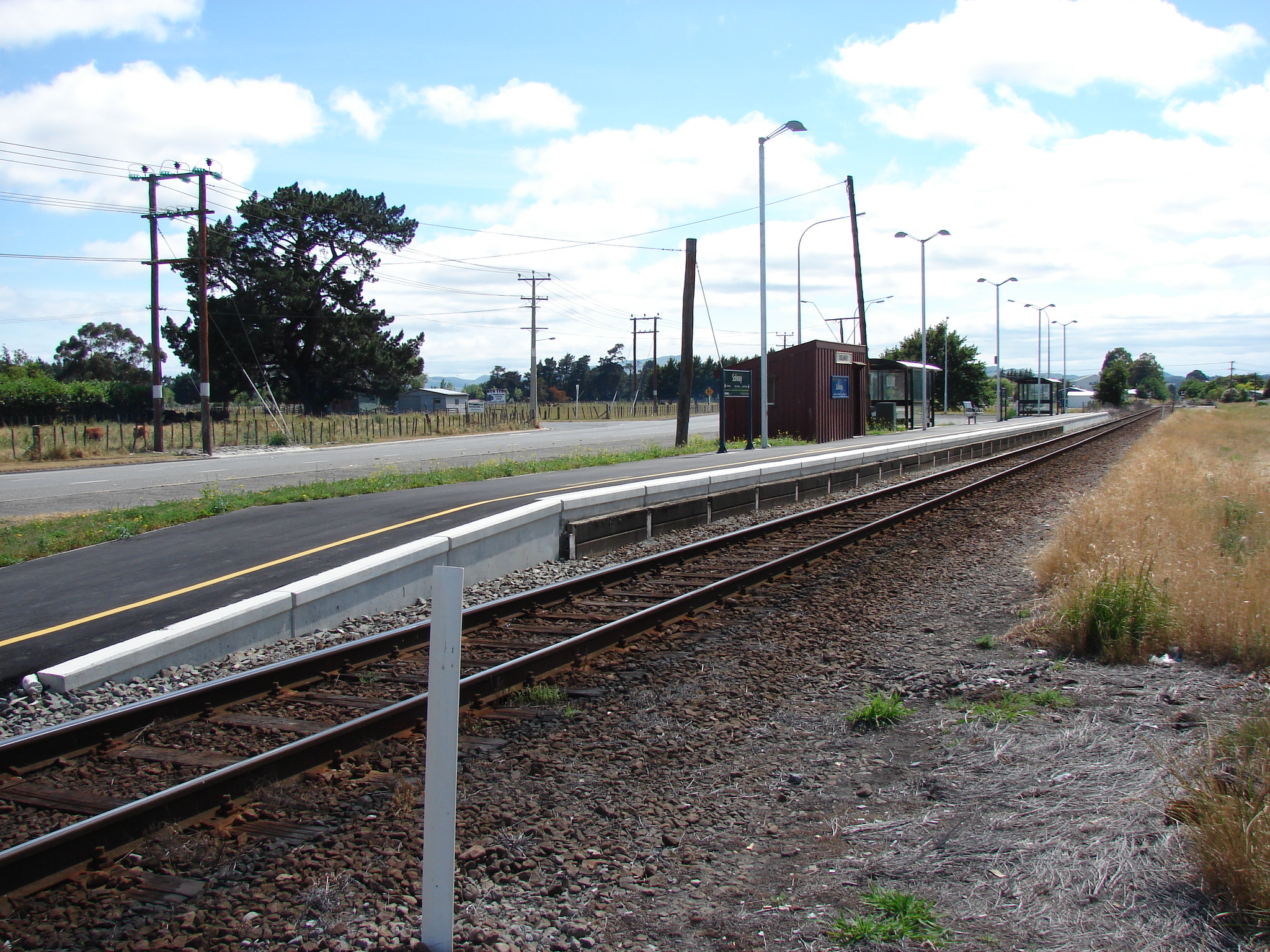
Solway railway station.

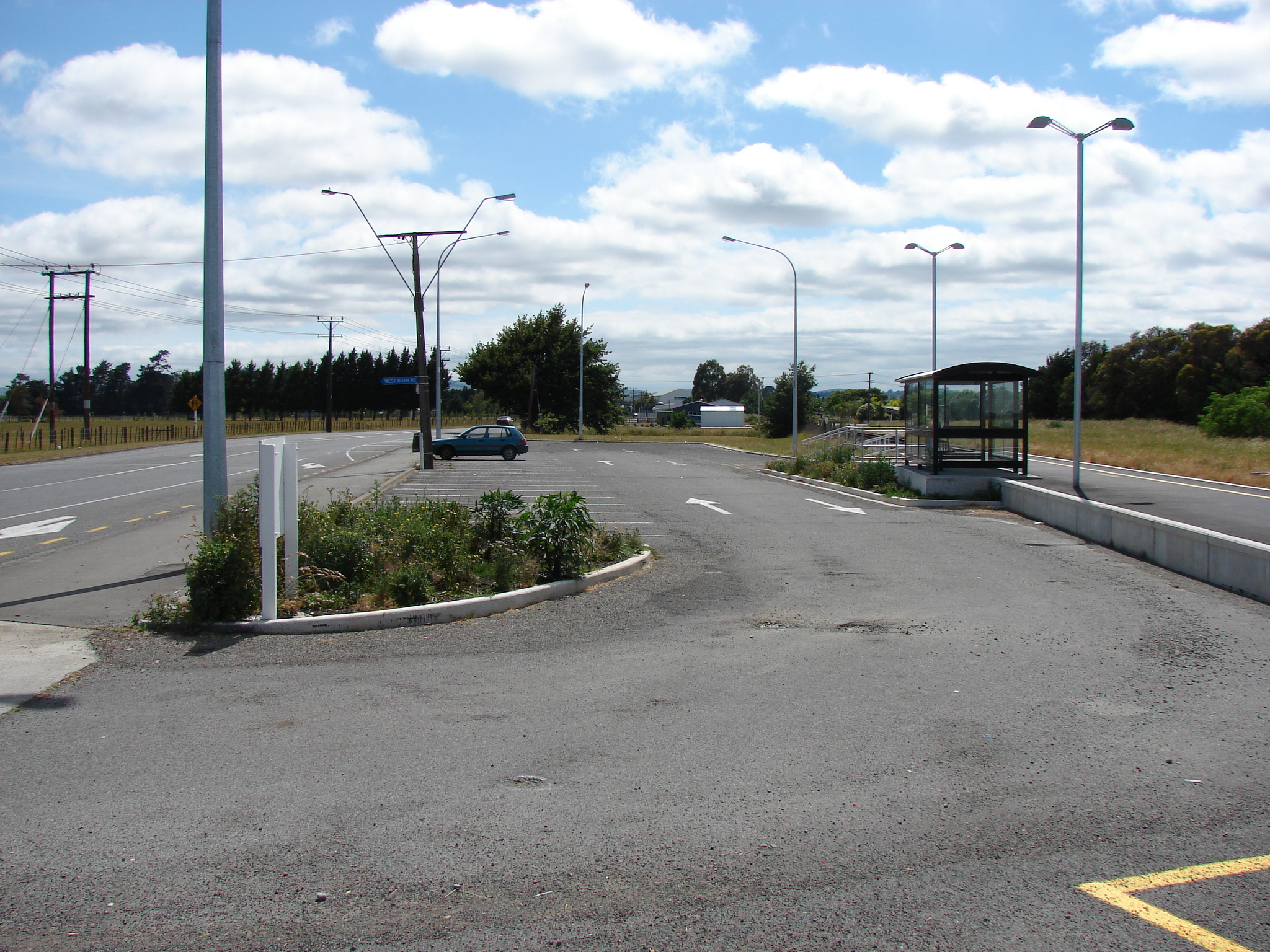
Solway Railway Station car park.
