= Emmanuel Blamires =

English cricketer

Personal information
- Full name: Emmanuel Blamires
- Born: 31 July 1850; Bradford, West Riding of Yorkshire, England
- Died: 22 March 1886 (aged 35); Bradford, West Riding of Yorkshire, England
- Nickname: Nimrod Blamires
- Batting: Left-handed
- Bowling: Left-arm roundarm-fast

Domestic team information
- Years: Team
- 1878–1881: Surrey
- 1877: Yorkshire

Career statistics
| Competition | FC |
|---|---|
| Matches | 36 |
| Runs scored | 440 |
| Batting average | 9.56 |
| 100s/50s | –/– |
| Top score | 31 |
| Balls bowled | 7,768 |
| Wickets | 137 |
| Bowling average | 20.02 |
| 5 wickets in innings | 9 |
| 10 wickets in match | 2 |
| Best bowling | 8/77 |
| Catches/stumpings | 28/– |
- Source: Cricinfo, 30 November 2010

Emmanuel Blamires (31 July 1850 – 22 March 1886) was an English first-class cricketer, who appeared in one match for Yorkshire and thirty two for Surrey between 1877 and 1881. Blamires was a left-handed batsman who bowled left-arm roundarm-fast. He was born in Bradford, West Riding of Yorkshire.

In 36 first-class games he took 137 wickets at a bowling average of 20.02, with a best of 8 for 77 against Kent. Other notable bowling performances for Surrey include his haul of 7 for 59 against Gloucestershire, and 6 for 98 against Middlesex. He also scored 440 runs at 9.56, with a best of 31.

A warehouseman in Bradford by trade, he was also engaged as a professional cricketer in 1871-72 at the Albion club, Bradford, then in 1873 at Burnley, Lancashire, before being engaged in 1874 and 1875 by Dalton in Huddersfield. In 1876 he played for Low Moor, near Bradford and, in 1877, he was given a solitary game by Yorkshire against Middlesex at Lord's, in which he took 5 for 82, as Yorkshire won by 35 runs.

Blamires saw his prospects at Yorkshire limited by the supremacy of Peate and thus he sought an engagement with Surrey and qualified by residence. He appeared for his new county between 1878 and 1881. His highest score was 31 against Middlesex in 1880.

Blamires also appeared in the Gentlemen v Players match, for the South of England and for an England XI in first-class games.

In the 1881 census, he was shown as resident at 15 William Street, Lambeth, Surrey, aged 31, and employed as "a cricket ground man". He lived with his wife Anne, aged 30, born in Bradford, his daughters Mary E., aged eight and Harriet, aged one, and his son David A., aged five. Frances Ward, aged 57, widowed mother (presumably of Anne), from Wakefield also lived in the home.

In 1882, he returned to Yorkshire and to professional club cricketer at Manningham, in Bradford. He died of consumption, at the age of 35, at the White Abbey Hotel, Bradford, and was buried in the Scholemoor Cemetery, near the city.
