= Steve Blamires =

British historian

Steve Blamires (born 1955) is a researcher and historian in the field of Neopaganism, Celtic spirituality, and folklore, and the author of three books in these fields.

== Early life ==
Born in Ayr on the west coast of Scotland, he studied the western mystery tradition for twelve years with Gareth Knight, then directed his studies to Celtic subjects. He and his now ex-wife Helen Star founded "Wandering Angus," a Celtic resource and educational center in Washington State. He now lives in Beacon, New York.

== Involvement in Celtic traditions and studies ==
Blamires is an authority on Celtic traditions, and represented the Celtic peoples at the Council for a Parliament of the World's Religions. In 1986 he founded the Celtic Research and Folklore Society in Scotland, and wrote and edited the CRFS journal Seanchas. He has worked with Tibetan Buddhist monks to make Holy Isle, Firth of Clyde, Scotland, a place of spiritual retreat for people of all beliefs. He is a member of the Company of Hawkwood and a co-founder of the Company of Avalon. He also teaches an overview of Celtic Culture through Peninsula College.

He helped establish the Highland Clearances Memorial Fund in 1996, and has since helped facilitate events to generate funds to commemorate the tragedy of the Highland Clearances.

== William Sharp / Fiona MacLeod ==
Blamires is an authority on the life and work of William Sharp, AKA the Scottish poet, writer and mystic Fiona MacLeod. He published a biography of William Sharp in 2008 entitled The Little Book of the Great Enchantment.

== Travels ==
He has traveled extensively on all seven continents, has circumnavigated the globe, and visited over fifty countries. He is an authority on the Celtic, Viking and Inuit peoples, and has an extensive knowledge of the society, culture and history of Ireland, Scotland, Iceland and Greenland. He is a Royal Yachting Association licensed Zodiac driver, and has worked as an expedition leader for Lindblad Expeditions and the National Geographic Society since 2002.

== Bibliography ==
- 1992 - The Irish Celtic Magical Tradition: Ancient Wisdom of the Battle of Moytura (Thorsons Pub) ISBN 1-85538-149-4
- 1994 - Glamoury: Magic of the Celtic Green World - (Llewellyn Publications) ISBN 1-56718-069-8 (reissued as Magic of the Celtic Otherworlds - Irish History, Lore & Rituals)
- 1995 - Celtic Tree Mysteries: Secrets of the Ogham (Llewellyn Publications) ISBN 1-56718-070-1
- 2005 - Magic of the Celtic Otherworld: Irish History, Lore & Rituals (Llewellyn Publications) ISBN 978-0-738706-57-3
- 2008 - The Little Book of the Great Enchantment: A Biography of William Sharp (RJ Stewart Publications) ISBN 978-0-9819246-3-2
- 2012 - The Chonicles of the Sidhe (Skylight Press) ISBN 978-1-908011-59-6
- 2014 - Foam of the Past: Selected Writings of Fiona Macleod (Skylight Press) ISBN 978-1-908011-73-2
- 2025 - The Confessions of Fiona: Mythology and folklore of the Faeries (Crossed Crow Books) ISBN 978-1-959883-92-0

== Reviews ==
- Review of Glamoury: Magic of the Celtic Green Worlds by Jennifer Martin

== Articles ==
- "The Five Invasions of Ireland" http://www.aislingmagazine.com/AislingMagazine/articles/TAM24/TheFive.html
- "The Highland Clearances: An Introduction" http://www.rfs.scotshome.com/An_Introduction_to_the_highland_clearances.html
- "Glastonbury Talk September 1st 2007" http://www.companyofavalon.net/steve_blamires%20address.htm
- "Remembering Forgotten Simplicities" http://www.llewellynjournal.com/article/328
