= Henry Blamires =

New Zealand cricketer and clergyman (1871–1965)

Personal information
- Full name: Henry Lawrence Blamires
- Born: 17 April 1871; Bendigo, Victoria, Australia
- Died: 18 August 1965 (aged 94); Auckland, New Zealand
- Batting: Right-handed
- Relatives: Edgar Blamires (brother); Ernest Blamires (brother); Pat Evison (niece)

Domestic team information
- Years: Team
- 1911–12 to 1913–14: Hawke's Bay

Career statistics
Competition	First-class
Matches	3
Runs scored	112
Batting average	22.40
100s/50s	0/1
Top score	55*
Balls bowled	36
Wickets	0
Bowling average	–
5 wickets in innings	–
10 wickets in match	–
Best bowling	–
Catches/stumpings	2/–
- Source: Cricket Archive, 2 May 2014

Henry Lawrence Blamires (17 April 1871 – 18 August 1965) was a New Zealand first-class cricketer and clergyman.

== Personal life and clerical career ==
One of five brothers who became clergymen, Henry Blamires was born in Bendigo, Australia, and educated at Wesley College in Melbourne, which was then a Methodist school for boys. He was ordained in 1900 and appointed minister to the Wesleyan church in Hamilton, New Zealand. He served as minister in Gore from 1903, and later posts included Wellington, Napier, Wanganui and Nelson.

Blamires served as a chaplain with the New Zealand forces in World War I. He retired from the ministry in 1930 and devoted himself to veterans' welfare.

He married Jane Collier, a teacher of the blind, in Auckland in March 1900. They had three children. Until his death in Auckland in August 1965, aged 94, Blamires was the last surviving New Zealand chaplain from World War I.

== Cricket career ==
Blamires played three first-class matches for Hawke's Bay between 1911 and 1914. In his first match, aged 40, against Wellington, he made 55 not out in the second innings. His brother Ernest made his first-class debut in the same match, playing for Wellington. In his next match the next season, also against Wellington, Henry made 37 in the first innings before being bowled by Clarrie Grimmett. Two weeks later he captained Hawke's Bay against the touring Australians, but was dismissed cheaply twice by Arthur Mailey. It was Blamires's last first-class match.

Blamires continued to play cricket for many years. He played Hawke Cup matches in the 1920s for Wanganui, Nelson and Wairarapa, for whom in his last match at the age of 57 he top-scored with 56.
