= Hood Aerodrome =

- Steadfast landing at Hood Aerodrome
- IATA: MRO; ICAO: NZMS

Summary
- Airport type: General aviation
- Owner: Masterton District Council
- Operator: Masterton District Council
- Serves: Masterton, Carterton, Martinborough
- Location: Masterton, New Zealand
- Elevation AMSL: 111 m (364 ft)
- Coordinates: 40°58′30″S 175°38′00″E
- Website: http://hoodaerodrome.org.nz/

Map
- Location of airport in North Island

Runways
Direction	Length		Surface
Direction	m	ft	Surface
06C/24C	1,250	4,101	Asphalt
06R/24L	1,060	3,478	Grass
~~06L/24R~~	~~450~~	~~1,476~~	~~Grass~~
10/28	1,042	3,419	Grass

Hood Aerodrome (IATA: MRO, ICAO: NZMS) is an aerodrome, located in Masterton, New Zealand, located 1 NM Southwest of Masterton town centre in the suburb of Solway. The aerodrome was named after George Hood, a pioneer Masterton aviator who died trying to make the first Trans-Tasman crossing in 1928. The aerodrome is used extensively for general aviation flights, and has also been used for commercial flights.

Air New Zealand stopped serving the airport from 5 February 2014.

Two new airlines have looked at re-instating a service to Auckland using larger aircraft but the runway will need to be lengthened to 1,400 m and widened to 30 m first before it can start.

== History ==
The Masterton Aerodrome was opened in 1931. It served as RNZAF Station Masterton was used during operations in World War II.

Historically, Hood Aerodrome has been served by South Pacific Airlines of New Zealand in 1962–1966 and two locally based carriers, Wairarapa Airlines which linked Masterton with Auckland, Hamilton, Rotorua, Nelson and Christchurch from August 1981 to January 1997. Then a new airline Air Wairarapa briefly flew to Auckland via Paraparumu in 2002. Between February 2009 and February 2014, Eagle Airways, a subsidiary of Air New Zealand Link flew to Auckland from Masterton. The flights were operated by 19-seat Beechcraft 1900D aircraft. In September 2013, Air New Zealand announced the airline would withdraw all services to Masterton from 5 February 2014, due to a lack of demand. The airport is working on a plan to reinstate an air service to Auckland with an invitation to the airlines underway.

Grass runway 06L/24R closed in November 2019 following an independent review of operations at the aerodrome.

Work to widen the main runway and expand the apron is in the planning stage. The budget set for this project is $17 million.

Air Chathams said in February 2024 that they are interested in serving Masterton to Auckland once the aerodrome upgrades are complete.

Upgrade works on the runway were completed in 2025. But unfortunately the airport didn't reach safety credentials for most aircraft to operate without the correct runway end safety area.

== Other uses ==
The aerodrome is the home of New Zealand's 'Sports and Vintage Aviation Society', which has had a hangar on site since 1978.

Since 1999 Hood Aerodrome has held a biennial airshow, Wings over Wairarapa. The eleventh such event took place on 26–27 February 2021, the final scheduled display on 28 February being cancelled due to a change in New Zealand's COVID-19 alert level.

Masterton Motorplex has a purpose built dragstrip within the grounds of the aerodrome. They previously used a runway before the construction of the dragstrip began in 2011.

== See also ==
- List of airports in New Zealand
- List of airlines of New Zealand
- Transport in New Zealand
