= Solway College =

Location
- Fleet Street, Masterton, New Zealand; 40°57′32″S 175°37′42″E

Information
- Type: State Integrated Girls Secondary Years 7–13
- Motto: Timor dei principium sapientiae Being in awe of God is the beginning of wisdom.
- Established: 1916; 110 years ago
- Ministry of Education Institution no.: 242
- Principal: Janine Tupaea
- Enrolment: 207 (July 2026)
- Socio-economic decile: 7O
- Website: solwaycollege.school.nz

Solway College is a girls' boarding school in Masterton, New Zealand. It is an integrated school for girls from Year 7 to Year 13 (Forms 1 to 7) with a limited number of day girl places. The College was founded in 1916.

== History ==
The College was established in 1916 by the Reverend Laurence Thompson and his wife Mrs Marion Thompson who was also the first principal.

=== Beginnings ===
The Solway property was a colonial homestead sited in a 100 acres (0.40 km^{2}) originally owned by the Donald family who had first settled the area in 1877. The 80 acres (320,000 m^{2}) adjacent to what would become Solway College were purchased by the Masterton A & P Society for a showground leaving some 18 acres (73,000 m^{2}) planted in heritage trees – silver fir, deodar, spruce, larches, lime, weeping ash, cypress lawsoniana, photinia, juniper, Californian redwood and poplar. A large number of shrubs and native New Zealand bush completed the beautifully laid out grounds. The homestead was constructed entirely from heart totara. The absentee owner at that time was Mrs J. McMaster and the property had been used as a military convalescent hospital.

=== Early days ===
The school opened in February 1916 with a roll of nineteen boarders and two day girls, followed by 61 pupils the year after, and 100 by 1918. In that year, the school was incorporated as 'Solway Girls' College, Masterton, Inc.' To this point, nervousness about financial commitment with a world at war had meant the school had opened on the basis of a lease with a five-year right of purchase. The lease had been guaranteed by prominent members of the Wairarapa business and church communities.

As pressure on accommodation and facilities grew with the school roll, a new dormitory block was constructed and completed in 1918. It included open balconies fitted with canvas blinds and some girls were accommodated on these balconies. An assembly hall and other buildings were completed in 1919.

In its early years the school was beset with a succession of illnesses amongst both students and staff. The sweeping influenza epidemic claimed the loss of one child in 1919, with mumps and measles spreading the following year. 1925 brought an infantile paralysis outbreak, and the rural location of the school did not protect it from scarlet fever as it swept through New Zealand in the late 1920s. In many cases, the school was quarantined for lengthy periods, when neither staff nor students could leave.

=== Hard times ===
Solway College Main House 2008

1931 began with an increased roll, as the college took in girls from colleges which had been damaged in the Napier earthquake. A dozen boarding places were offered free of charge to assist families. Whilst the earthquake's impact on Hawke's Bay schools was tragic, the resulting influx for Solway is credited as having insulated the school against the worst effects of the Great Depression. Nonetheless, the school could not entirely escape hardship. In 1932, the board effected a 20% salary cut, with some discussion on possible closure, as the roll dropped to a mere 50. By comparison, however, the school appeared in reasonable shape: Dr Gibb, then chairman of the board of governors at Scots College commented at the time to principal Marion Thompson: "where ever did you get 50 boarders?"

=== Recovery and progress ===
Towards the end of the 1930s the roll rebounded, marking the strongest period of growth in the school's history. Board commitment to expansion of facilities in line with a healthy roll was received in 1936. A period of major construction works commenced, despite a shortage of skilled tradesmen due to the Second World War. The founding of the school in an old homestead rather than a purpose-built college, and the expanse of the grounds, meant that a number of new buildings were created stand-alone rather than attached to the main house. These buildings have served various purposes over the years, such as a hospital and a library. Many are now dormitories in order to accommodate a larger school roll.

Day girls were accepted regularly at the college from 1954. Further construction in this decade was undertaken on more dormitories, a chapel, new dining facilities. Adjacent land was also purchased to expand playing fields.

=== Integration ===
In 1978, Solway College became one of the first girls' boarding colleges to become integrated under the government's Private Schools Conditional Integration Act (1975). The integration agreement with the Education Department (now Ministry of Education) defined the 'special character' elements the school wished to retain, some being:

- non-sectarianism but affiliation with the Presbyterian church
- importance of the Christian faith, and its moral and ethical standards, in society, cultural heritage and daily life
- a multiracial school providing education to pupils from families in all walks of life
- expectation of day girls to participate fully in all activities of the school both in and out of school hours
- creating a family atmosphere where girls can learn and attain the correct attitudes for responsible citizenship.

Under the agreement, the school operates with a board of proprietors (formerly, board of governors) who own and maintain the grounds, buildings and facilities and manage the staff associated with their use by the school. A board of trustees administers the school and manages the teaching section in conjunction with the Ministry of Education.

=== Challenges ===
The school experienced a brief low in the 1980s, when the roll dropped to 65 and rumours of closure appeared in the press. A public meeting was held, drawing people from all over New Zealand, resulting in a strong commitment from stakeholders for the school to remain open.

== Principals ==
	Name	Term	Notes
1	Mrs M.B. Thompson	1916–1942	
2	Miss H.M.M. McRae	1942–1944	
3	Miss P. Sutton	1944–1945	
4	Miss L.R. Todd	1946–1953	
5	Miss I Wilson	1951	(acting)
6	Miss E.M. Boyd	1954–1956	
7	Miss L.R. Todd	1956	
8	Miss J.I.E. Bissett	1957–1965	
9	Miss R. Roberts	1965–1967	
10	Miss R.I. Gardner	1967	
11	Miss D.L. Grigg	1968–1971	
12	Miss M.W. Murray	1971–1988	
13	Miss M. Amor	1989	
14	Mrs P.R.Y. Durham	1989–1999	
15	Mrs E. Rogerson	1999–2019	
16	Mrs Janine Tupaea	2019–present	

== Notable alumnae ==
- Dame Pat Evison – actor
- Dame Anne Salmond – anthropologist
