= Cobblestones Museum =

Museum and Heritage Village in Greytown, New Zealand

Cobblestones Heritage Village

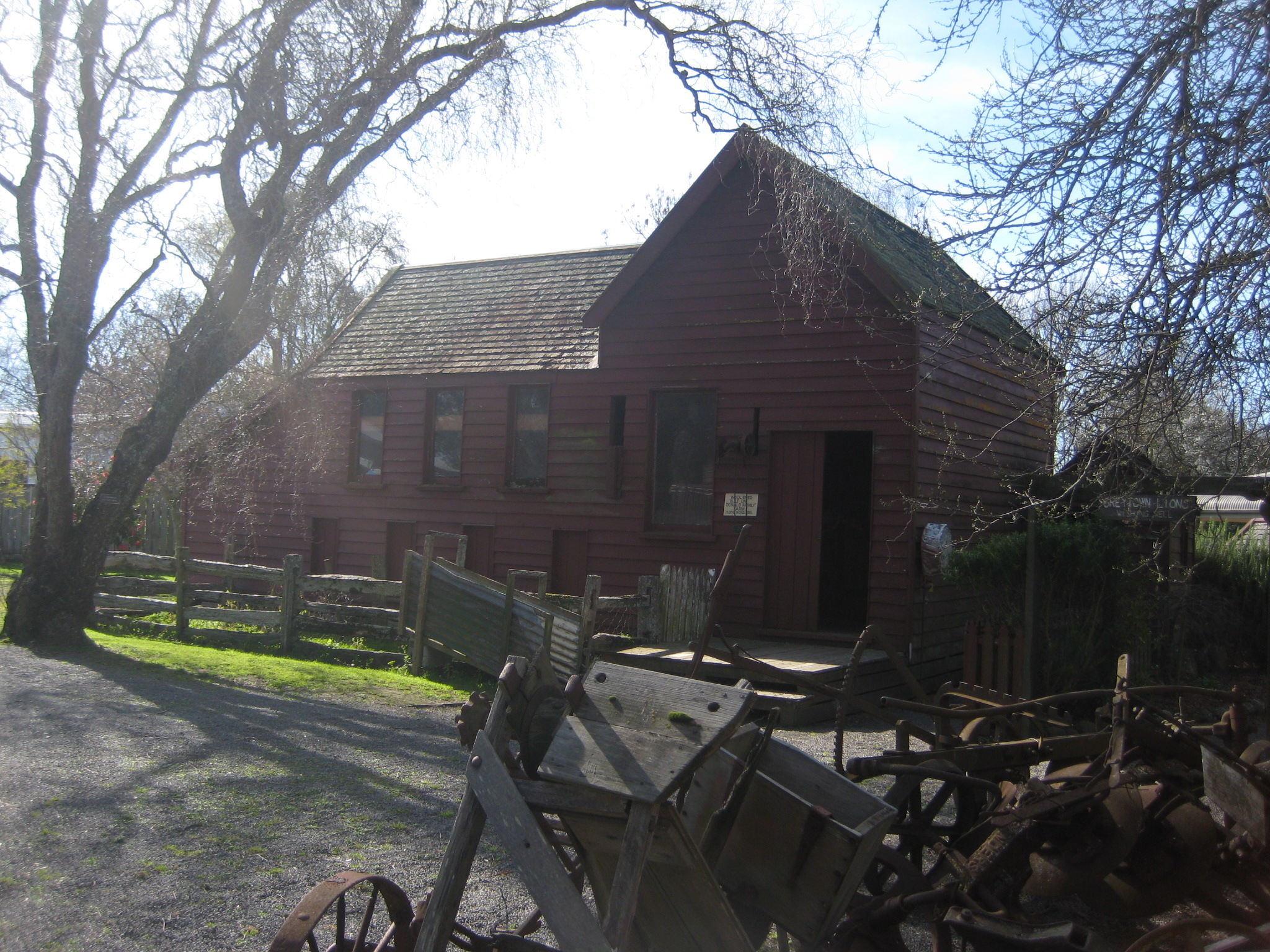
- The Donald Woolshed, Wairarapa's first purpose built woolshed, built Manaia (now Solway) c.1858
- Location: 169 Main Street, Greytown, New Zealand, New Zealand
- Coordinates: 41.085307°S 175.455598°E
- Type: Heritage Village and Museum
- Visitors: 12,000+ (2025)
- Chairperson: Lynn Bushell
- Website: Cobblestones Museum

Heritage New Zealand – Category 2
- Official name: Cobblestones Shearing Shed and Cobblestone Museum Stables
- Designated: 23 June 1983
- Reference no.: 2873 and 4003

Cobblestones is a Heritage Village in Greytown, New Zealand. Centred around the original historic Hastwell stables and existing cobblestone courtyard used by stage coaches travelling between Masterton and Wellington. Cobblestones contains six Category 2 Heritage NZ listed buildings, these include:

- a colonial cottage (built c.1867),
- Wairarapa's first Public Hospital in Greytown (built 1875),
- Wairarapa's first Methodist church (built 1865),
- the single-teacher Mangapakeha country school building which opened in 1902
- The Hastwell Stables. and
- the Donald Woolshed (built 1858), Wairarapa's first purpose built woolshed.

== Exhibition Centre and Coach House ==
The Exhibition Centre features Wairarapa heritage stories, objects, photos and machinery. Finished in November 2014 after many years of fundraising it also holds the collection room which curates objects within the collection. The Coach House is a multi purpose indoor venue which showcases the horse drawn carriage transport, dairy and timber industries importance in the early development of Wairarapa. Both venues are used for weddings, expos, musical events, small conferences, corporate retreats and celebrations along with the Church and grounds.

== Cobblestones Park & Gardens ==
The Heritage Village at Cobblestones is set in park-like grounds and gardens. The variety of native and exotic trees at Cobblestones befits Greytown's significance as the first New Zealand town to celebrate Arbor Day. Native kahikatea, kowhai, totara and karaka can be seen together with exotic trees, maples, ash and fruit trees. Cobblestones garden is a popular Wairarapa garden tour and wedding venue.
