= Ernest Blamires =

New Zealand minister and cricketer

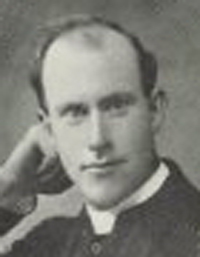

Personal information
- Full name: Ernest Oswald Blamires
- Born: 11 June 1881; Warrnambool, Victoria, Australia
- Died: 6 June 1963 (aged 81); Auckland, New Zealand
- Batting: Right-handed
- Bowling: Slow
- Relatives: Pat Evison (daughter); Edgar Blamires (brother); Henry Blamires (brother)

Domestic team information
- Years: Team
- 1911/12–1912/13: Wellington
- 1923/24–1926/27: Otago

Career statistics
Competition	First-class
Matches	20
Runs scored	1,015
Batting average	26.71
100s/50s	2/5
Top score	133
Balls bowled	1,508
Wickets	15
Bowling average	49.53
5 wickets in innings	0
10 wickets in match	0
Best bowling	4/56
Catches/stumpings	20/0
- Source: CricketArchive, 1 May 2014

Ernest Oswald Blamires (11 June 1881 – 6 June 1963) was a New Zealand first-class cricketer and clergyman.

== Life and clerical career ==
Ernest Blamires was born at Warrnambool in Australia, and went to school at Wesley College in Melbourne, which was then a Methodist school for boys. He went into commerce on leaving school, but in 1903 he followed his father to New Zealand and became a Methodist minister.

He served as a minister for the next 56 years. He was General Secretary of the New Zealand Bible in Schools League and wrote the book A Christian Core for New Zealand Education (1960).

His four elder brothers were all ministers. One, Henry, played first-class cricket for Hawke's Bay.

After his first wife died, Blamires married again. He had three daughters, one of whom, Patricia, became a prominent actress. He died in hospital in the northern Auckland suburb of Takapuna in June 1963, aged 81.

== Cricket career ==
A hard-hitting batsman, known as "The Cricketing Cleric", Ernest Blamires played for a number of teams as he moved around New Zealand in his work as a minister. He played five first-class matches for Wellington in 1911–12 and 1912–13, captaining the team in one match.

While working at Hāwera, Blamires played for the South Taranaki team in 1913–14 and 1914–15, twice in the Hawke Cup and once against the touring Australians. He played for Waikato in the Hawke Cup in 1921–22, and for a combined Taranaki and Wanganui team against MCC in 1922–23.

Transferring to Dunedin, Blamires resumed his first-class career at the age of 42, playing for Otago in the 1923–24 season. In his first match, batting at number four, he made 35 and 133 in a victory over Canterbury. When Otago played the touring New South Wales cricket team he made 33 and 67 as an opener, and he was selected to play for New Zealand in their second match against New South Wales. Batting at number three, he made a pair.

Blamires was appointed to captain Otago in 1924–25, and led them to their first Plunket Shield championship. Batting at number six, he made 117 in 183 minutes in the match against Wellington. He continued to captain the side in 1925–26 and 1926–27, when he played his last first-class match. He continued playing cricket for some years. In 1929–30 he top-scored for Wairarapa against the touring MCC team.

Dick Brittenden described Blamires as "an excellent bat" and "a cricketer of considerable resource, [who] once, when playing Warwick Armstrong's leg theory, changed from right-hand to left-hand briefly, the better to cope with the situation" – an early example of the switch hit.
