= Edgar Blamires =

New Zealand Methodist minister and community leader

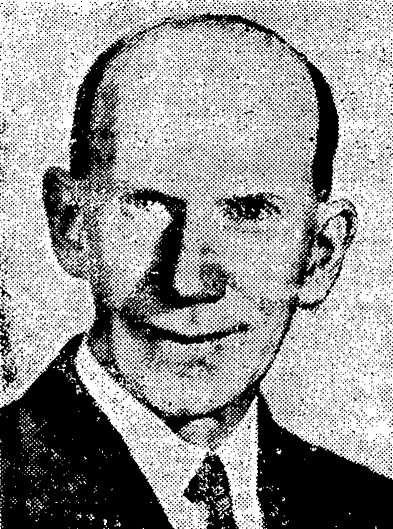
Edgar Blamires

Edgar Percy Blamires (7 January 1878 – 16 March 1967) was a New Zealand Methodist minister and community leader. He was born in Fitzroy, Victoria, Australia, on 7 January 1878.

Blamires held the position of Secretary of the New Zealand Council of Religious Education from 1925 to the 1940s. He represented New Zealand at the American and British Methodist Conferences in 1939. He served as the youth director for the Methodist Church for 17 years.

Blamires retired from active ministry in 1939. During World War II he went to England and served with the British Methodist Conference. After the war he returned to New Zealand and was instrumental in the formation of the National Marriage Guidance Council of New Zealand in 1949. From 1947 to 1965 he promoted the marriage guidance movement in New Zealand, Australia and Fiji.

Blamires came from a family of Methodist ministers. His father officiated at Edgar's wedding to Martha McKinney in Christchurch in October 1907, and two of his brothers, Henry and Ernest, assisted. He died at the age of 89 after walking into the path of a car in Auckland in March 1967. He was survived by his wife, a son and a daughter.

== Books ==
- Changing Strategy in Evangelism 1952
- Youth Movement: The Story of the Rise and Development of the Christian Youth Movement in the Churches of New Zealand as Seen by a Methodist 1952
- Education for Marriage and Family Living 1956
- War Tests the Church 1957
- Fifty-Fifty: Questions and Answers about Your Life 1961
- A Child is a Person 1965

Blamires also wrote several short pamphlets on religious matters and family life.
