= Frank Hoar (cricketer) =

New Zealand cricketer

Personal information
- Full name: Frank Rutter Hoar
- Born: 21 September 1896; Wellington, New Zealand
- Died: 27 May 1972 (aged 75); Masterton, Wairarapa, New Zealand
- Batting: Right-handed
- Bowling: Right-arm legbreak
- Role: Bowler
- Relatives: Newman Hoar (son)

Domestic team information
- Years: Team
- 1920/21–1945/46: Wairarapa
- 1928/29: Wellington
- Source: Cricinfo, 24 October 2020

Frank Rutter Hoar (21 September 1896 – 27 May 1972) was a New Zealand cricketer. He played in two first-class matches for Wellington during the 1928–29 season.

Hoar was born at Wellington in 1896. He played cricket for the Wairarapa cricket team during the 1920–21 season, going on to represent the side in the Hawke Cup between 1921–22 and 1945–45. Both of his first-class matches were played for Wellington during 1928–29 over the Christmas–New Year period. Primarily a bowler, on debut against Otago at the Basin Reserve he took three wickets before taking two and scoring 13 not out against Canterbury at Lancaster Park.

Hoar worked as a sculptor. His son, Newman Hoar, played for Wairarapa, Nelson, and Wellington, making six first-class appearances, four for Wellinton and two for New Zealand armed forces sides during World War II. Hoar died at Masterton in 1972.
