= Newman Hoar =

New Zealand cricketer

Personal information
- Full name: Newman Ronald Hoar
- Born: 4 September 1920; Masterton, New Zealand
- Died: 11 January 2017 (aged 96); Masterton, New Zealand
- Batting: Right-handed
- Bowling: Right-arm fast
- Relatives: Frank Hoar (father)

Domestic team information
- Years: Team
- 1938/39–1945/46: Wairarapa
- 1944/45: Wellington
- 1948/49–1956/57: Nelson
- 1959/60: Wairarapa

Career statistics
Competition	First-class
Matches	6
Runs scored	264
Batting average	33.00
100s/50s	0/2
Top score	76
Balls bowled	673
Wickets	10
Bowling average	33.40
5 wickets in innings	0
10 wickets in match	0
Best bowling	3/68
Catches/stumpings	3/–
- Source: CricketArchive, 7 July 2017

Newman Ronald Hoar (4 September 1920 – 11 January 2017) was a New Zealand cricketer who played first-class cricket between the 1942–43 and 1944–45 seasons. He was born in 1920 at Masterton in Wairarapa, the son of Frank Hoar who played first-class matches for Wellington during the 1928–29 season.

A lower-order batsman and opening bowler, Hoar played his first two first-class matches for New Zealand services teams during World War II while serving with the Royal New Zealand Air Force. He later played four matches for Wellington in the 1944–45 season. His highest score was 76, batting at number eight and top-scoring for Wellington against Canterbury in January 1945, and his best bowling figures were 3 for 68 against Auckland in his last first-class match a month later.

He also played Hawke Cup cricket from the 1938–39 season to 1958–59, representing Wairarapa and Nelson. In a Hawke Cup match for Wairarapa against Rangitikei in 1945–46 he scored 158 and 16 and took 5 for 48 and 3 for 41. In a two-day match for Nelson against Fiji in 1953–54 he scored 109 not out in 93 minutes.

Hoar and his wife Margaret had two daughters and three sons. He was a selector for the Central Districts cricket team after his playing career. He died at Masterton on 11 January 2017, and was buried at Riverside Park Lawn Cemetery.
