= Colin Pugh Sports Bowl =

Multi-purpose stadium in New Zealand

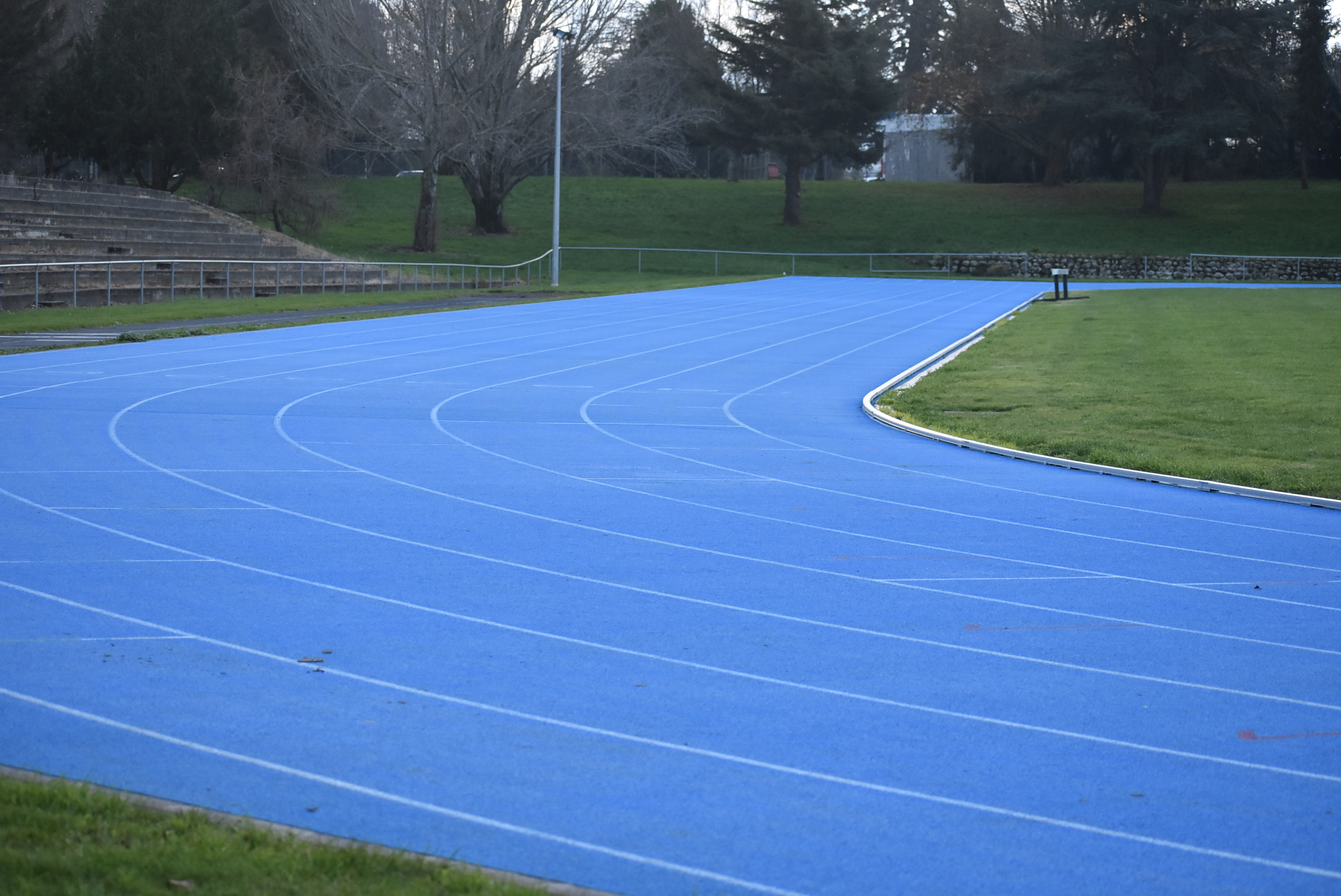
- All-weather athletics track in 2023
- Interactive map of Colin Pugh Sports Bowl
- Former names: Masterton Sports Bowl
- Location: Queen Elizabeth Park, Masterton, New Zealand
- Coordinates: 40.94677°S 175.67074°E
- Owner: Masterton District Council
- Surface: Grass field, synthetic athletics track

The Colin Pugh Sports Bowl is a multi-purpose stadium located in Queen Elizabeth Park in Masterton, New Zealand. It is currently used mostly for athletics and football.

== History ==
=== Background ===
Athletics and cycling events had been held on a grass circuit in the oval at Queen Elizabeth Park up until the mid 1960s. In May 1964, the track was surveyed, and found to not comply with the specifications for athletics tracks. Several records awaiting acceptance were disallowed, and this was a significant blow to the athletics club.

Athletics events were moved to Memorial Park from August 1966. However, the park was used for rugby during the winter, and each summer season there were difficulties in creating an acceptable surface for athletics and cycling, and the athletics club continued to investigate options for a dedicated facility.

=== Establishment ===
In 1969, Colin Pugh, the parks superintendent, recommended to the Masterton Borough Council that an area of about 7 acres (2.8 ha) in Landsdowne should be considered for a dedicated athletics ground. At that time, the site was a hollow covered in gorse, blackberry and broom, with significant standing and fallen timber. There was also an old stop bank of the Waipoua River running through the site. The council needed to obtain property rights before the site could be developed.

Work to clear the site began in 1972. Volunteers made a large contribution towards preparing the site, and a local earthmoving company also donated their services. The project was supported with significant fundraising from the community.

The venue was originally known as the Masterton Sports Bowl. The Athletics and Cycling Masterton club built a clubhouse at the site in 1981. In 1989, the venue was renamed as the Colin Pugh Sports Bowl, after the former superintendent of parks in Masterton.

=== The all-weather track ===
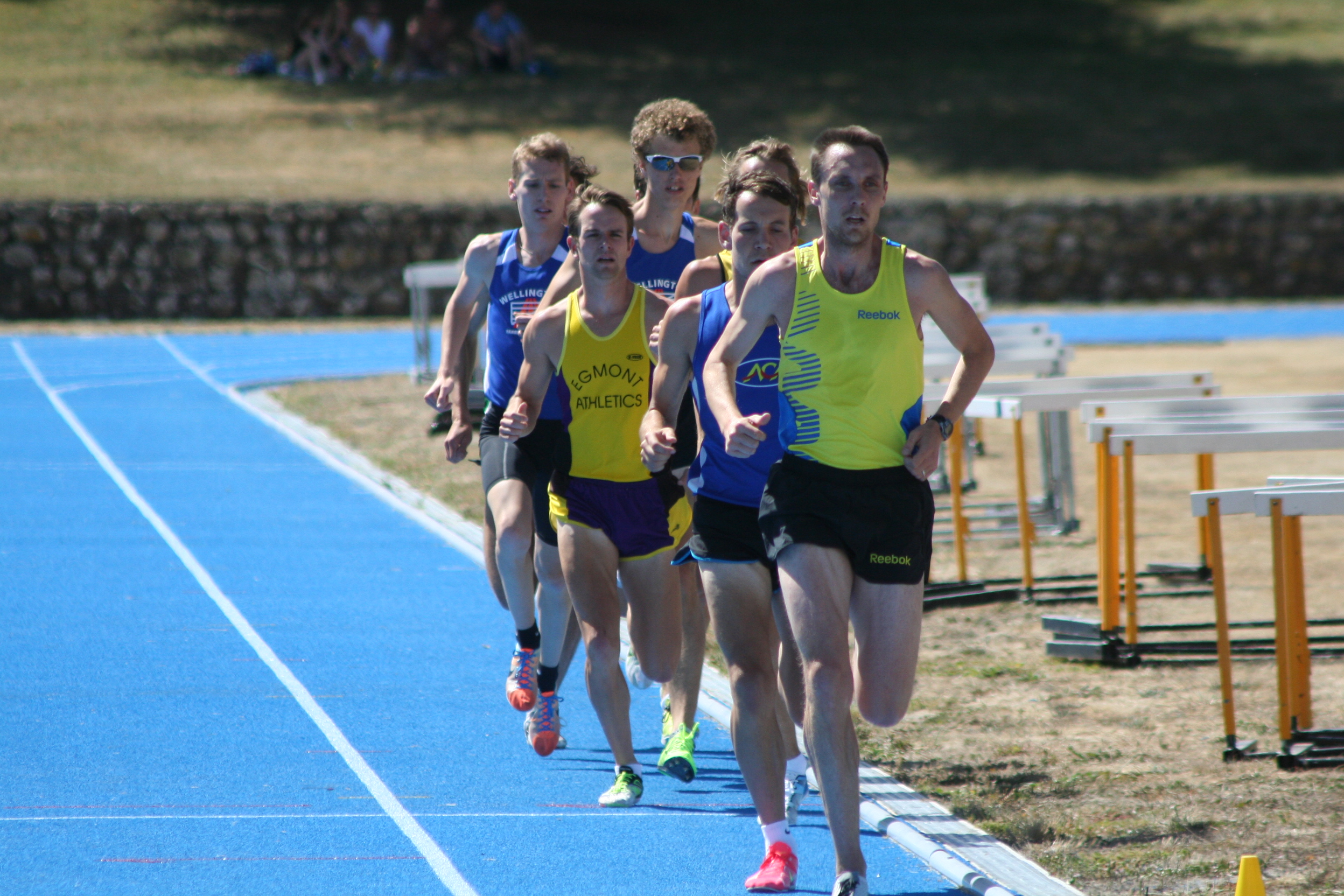
Nick Willis leading the field on the new all weather track, Colin Pugh Sportsbowl, in 2013

Planning for an all-weather athletics track in Masterton was underway by 2007. The Wairarapa Regional All Weather Track Trust was formed in 2009 to promote the need for an all-weather track and raise funds. Initial funding of $300,000 was obtained from the Masterton District Council. However, the project was delayed by difficulties in securing the remaining funding required to reach the target of $1m. In 2011, the Pelorus Trust provided a grant of $50,000 and obtained 10-year naming rights. Construction was underway by November 2011.

Installation of an Alsatan all-weather athletics track was completed in December 2012. Olympic medallist Nick Willis took part in the inaugural meet on the new track in January 2013.

In 2016, the Wairarapa Regional All Weather Track Trust handed over the track to the Masterton District Council for future management and operation, and the trust was dissolved.

== Certification ==
As at June 2023, the Colin Pugh Sports Bowl is accredited as a Class 2 certified facility by World Athletics.

== Events ==
Track and field meets and championships are regularly held at the venue. Major meets have included the 2013 North Island Secondary School Athletics Track and Field Championships, and the 2022 Wellington Primary and Intermediate Schools Regional Athletics Championship. The venue is also used as a base for harrier events.

The venue has been used for football games. It has also been the venue for outdoor concerts.
