= Malcolm Moorhouse =

New Zealand cricketer

Personal information
- Born: 1866; Hackney, Middlesex, England
- Died: 7 June 1955 (aged 88 or 89); London, England
- Nickname: Harry
- Batting: Right-handed
- Role: Batsman, sometimes wicket-keeper and bowler

Domestic team information
- Years: Team
- 1883-84, 1907-08: Canterbury
- 1886-87 to 1890-91: Wellington

Career statistics
Competition	First-class
Matches	12
Runs scored	376
Batting average	19.78
100s/50s	0/2
Top score	86
Balls bowled	266
Wickets	3
Bowling average	36.33
5 wickets in innings	0
10 wickets in match	0
Best bowling	1/15
Catches/stumpings	12/10
- Source: Cricinfo, 17 September 2018

Malcolm "Harry" Moorhouse (1866 – 7 June 1955) was an English-born cricketer who played first-class cricket in New Zealand for Canterbury and Wellington from 1884 to 1908.

== Life and career ==
Moorhouse was born in London and went to New Zealand in his boyhood. He was usually known as "Harry".

A middle-order batsman who often kept wicket and sometimes bowled, Moorhouse began playing for Addington in the Christchurch senior competition in the 1883–84 season. In the 1884–85 season he was Addington's only batsman to make a fifty. He played one first-class match for Canterbury at Lancaster Park in April 1884. During the second day of the match, play was suspended while a game of rugby was played on the ground between East Christchurch and South Canterbury. Moorhouse played in the rugby match as well, for East Christchurch.

He moved to Wellington in 1886 and joined the Phoenix club, which he captained to its three most successful seasons. He played several matches for Wellington. His excellent fielding at point was one of the few positive aspects of Wellington's showing against the touring Australian team in 1886–87. Against Nelson in 1888–89, after Nelson had been dismissed for 60 and Wellington were 17 for 3 in reply, Moorhouse went to the wicket and hit 63, "a fine dashing innings" which included nine fours and one five. Wellington went on to win by an innings. In his last match for Wellington, in 1890–91, he made the highest score of the match against Canterbury when he guided Wellington to an eight-wicket victory with 37 not out. In February 1891 the columnist "Slip" in the Otago Witness said that Moorhouse's batting that season "entitles him to be regarded as one of the finest batsmen – probably the finest batsman – in the colony".

Moorhouse also played rugby for Poneke during their dominant years in the Wellington competition, and represented Wellington.

He returned to England in 1891, playing club cricket in Surrey and Kent. He worked as a commercial traveller for a flour mill in Surrey.

In 1907 he returned to New Zealand, living in Christchurch again. In 1907-08 he scored 42 and 86 (the top score in the match) when Canterbury defeated Otago. He moved back to the North Island in 1908, to Masterton in the Wairarapa region, and represented Wairarapa in cricket several times. He captained them in the first match of the inaugural season of the Hawke Cup in December 1910, making their top score of 35 in the second innings. Playing for Masterton, he was the leading batsman in the Wairarapa competition in 1909–10.

In February 1912, when Moorhouse and his wife returned to England, where he had accepted a "lucrative appointment", the secretary of the Masterton Cricket Club wrote: "In Mr. Moorhouse this Club loses its Mentor, and the district its greatest cricketer."

Moorhouse died in London on 7 June 1955.
