= Ivan Sutherland (disambiguation) =

Ivan Sutherland (born 1938) is an American computer scientist and Internet pioneer.

Ivan Sutherland is also the name of:

- Ivan Sutherland (ethnologist) (1897–1952), New Zealand ethnologist and professor
- Ivan Sutherland (rower) (born 1950), New Zealand rower
