= Homebush (disambiguation) =

Homebush may refer to:

== In Australia ==
=== New South Wales ===
- Homebush, New South Wales, a suburb of Sydney
- Flemington, New South Wales, a suburb of Sydney formally called Homebush West
- Sydney Olympic Park, a suburb of Sydney formerly called Homebush Bay
- Penarie, New South Wales, a locality in south-western New South Wales formerly called Homebush.

=== Queensland ===
- Homebush, Queensland, a locality in the Mackay Region

=== Victoria ===
- Homebush, Victoria

== In New Zealand ==
- Homebush, New Zealand, in Selwyn District, Canterbury
- Homebush, Masterton
