= Olive Rose Sutherland =

New Zealand teacher

Olive Rose Sutherland (1894–1984) was a notable New Zealand teacher. She was born in Masterton, Wairarapa, New Zealand in 1894.

Her younger brother, Dr Ivan Sutherland, ethnologist and academic, died in 1952.
