= Homebush, Masterton =

Rural locality in Wellington Region, New Zealand

Homebush
- Locality
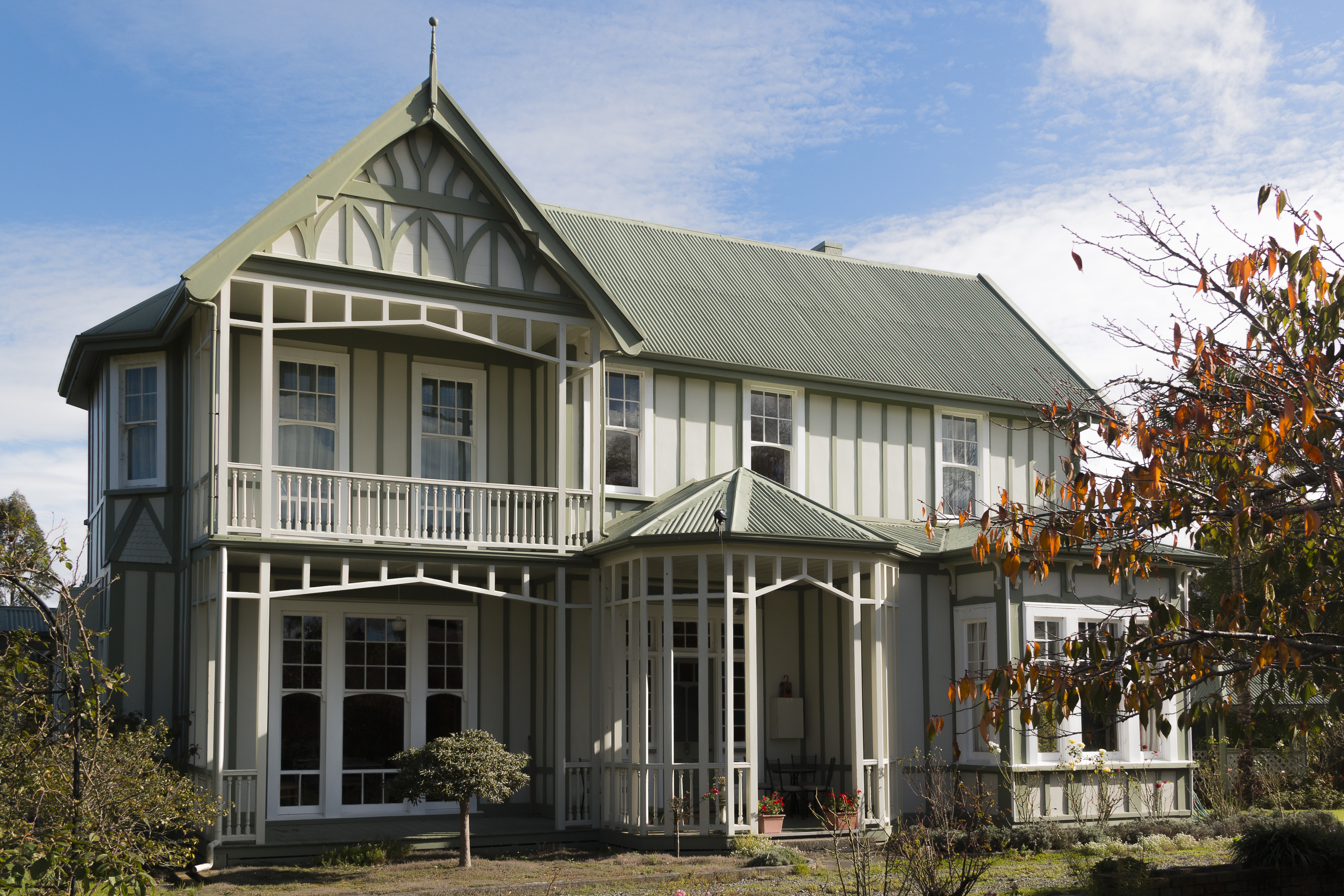
- Historic house at Homebush
- Interactive map of Homebush
- Coordinates: 40.974°S 175.673°E
- Region: Wellington Region
- Territorial authority: Masterton District
- Ward: Masterton/Whakaoriori General Ward; Masterton/Whakaoriori Māori Ward
- Electorates: Wairarapa; Ikaroa-Rāwhiti (Māori)

Government
  - Territorial Authority: Masterton District Council
  - Regional council: Greater Wellington Regional Council
  - Mayor of Masterton: Bex Johnson
  - Wairarapa MP: Mike Butterick
  - Ikaroa-Rāwhiti MP: Cushla Tangaere-Manuel

Area
  - Total: 14.03 km^{2} (5.42 sq mi)

Population (2023 census)
  - Total: 330
  - Density: 24/km^{2} (61/sq mi)

Homebush is a rural area in the Masterton District and Wellington Region of New Zealand's North Island. It is about 3 km (2 mi) southeast of Masterton.

The historic house at 10 Homebush Road was designed by Charles Natusch in 1891 for William Lucena. Lucena died very soon after the house was complete.

== Demographics ==
Homebush has an area of 14.03 km^{2} (5.42 sq mi) It is part of the larger Homebush-Te Ore Ore statistical area.

Historical populationfor Homebush
Year	Pop.	±% p.a.
2006	273	—
2013	252	−1.14%
2018	291	+2.92%
2023	330	+2.55%

Homebush had a population of 330 in the 2023 New Zealand census, an increase of 39 people (13.4%) since the 2018 census, and an increase of 78 people (31.0%) since the 2013 census. There were 165 males and 162 females in 117 dwellings. 2.7% of people identified as LGBTIQ+. There were 45 people (13.6%) aged under 15 years, 42 (12.7%) aged 15 to 29, 153 (46.4%) aged 30 to 64, and 87 (26.4%) aged 65 or older.

People could identify as more than one ethnicity. The results were 94.5% European (Pākehā), 11.8% Māori, 1.8% Pasifika, and 2.7% Asian. English was spoken by 98.2%, Māori by 1.8%, and other languages by 4.5%. No language could be spoken by 0.9% (e.g. too young to talk). New Zealand Sign Language was known by 0.9%. The percentage of people born overseas was 13.6, compared with 28.8% nationally.

Religious affiliations were 35.5% Christian, 1.8% Māori religious beliefs, 0.9% Buddhist, 0.9% New Age, and 0.9% other religions. People who answered that they had no religion were 54.5%, and 7.3% of people did not answer the census question.

Of those at least 15 years old, 63 (22.1%) people had a bachelor's or higher degree, 162 (56.8%) had a post-high school certificate or diploma, and 54 (18.9%) people exclusively held high school qualifications. 36 people (12.6%) earned over $100,000 compared to 12.1% nationally. The employment status of those at least 15 was 132 (46.3%) full-time, 51 (17.9%) part-time, and 3 (1.1%) unemployed.

=== Homebush-Te Ore Ore statistical area ===
Homebush-Te Ore Ore statistical area covers 103.11 km^{2} (39.81 sq mi). It had an estimated population of 1,260 as of June 2025, with a population density of 12 people per square kilometre (31 per square mile).

Historical population for the statistical area
Year	Pop.	±% p.a.
2006	960	—
2013	942	−0.27%
2018	1,050	+2.19%
2023	1,221	+3.06%

Homebush-Te Ore Ore had a population of 1,221 in the 2023 New Zealand census, an increase of 171 people (16.3%) since the 2018 census, and an increase of 279 people (29.6%) since the 2013 census. There were 588 males, 630 females, and 3 people of other genders in 429 dwellings. 1.7% of people identified as LGBTIQ+. The median age was 48.4 years (compared with 38.1 years nationally). There were 225 people (18.4%) aged under 15 years, 183 (15.0%) aged 15 to 29, 537 (44.0%) aged 30 to 64, and 276 (22.6%) aged 65 or older.

People could identify as more than one ethnicity. The results were 91.2% European (Pākehā); 15.2% Māori; 1.0% Pasifika; 2.2% Asian; 0.5% Middle Eastern, Latin American and African New Zealanders (MELAA); and 2.5% other, which includes people giving their ethnicity as "New Zealander". English was spoken by 98.5%, Māori by 3.2%, and other languages by 5.9%. No language could be spoken by 1.5% (e.g. too young to talk). New Zealand Sign Language was known by 0.5%. The percentage of people born overseas was 14.7, compared with 28.8% nationally.

Religious affiliations were 33.2% Christian, 0.2% Hindu, 0.2% Islam, 1.5% Māori religious beliefs, 0.5% Buddhist, 0.5% New Age, and 0.5% other religions. People who answered that they had no religion were 55.5%, and 8.1% of people did not answer the census question.

Of those at least 15 years old, 237 (23.8%) people had a bachelor's or higher degree, 573 (57.5%) had a post-high school certificate or diploma, and 186 (18.7%) people exclusively held high school qualifications. The median income was $43,200, compared with $41,500 nationally. 138 people (13.9%) earned over $100,000 compared to 12.1% nationally. The employment status of those at least 15 was 489 (49.1%) full-time, 207 (20.8%) part-time, and 15 (1.5%) unemployed.
