= Queen Elizabeth Park, Masterton =

Park in Masterton, New Zealand

Coordinates: 40°56′59.72″S 175°39′59.61″E

Queen Elizabeth Park
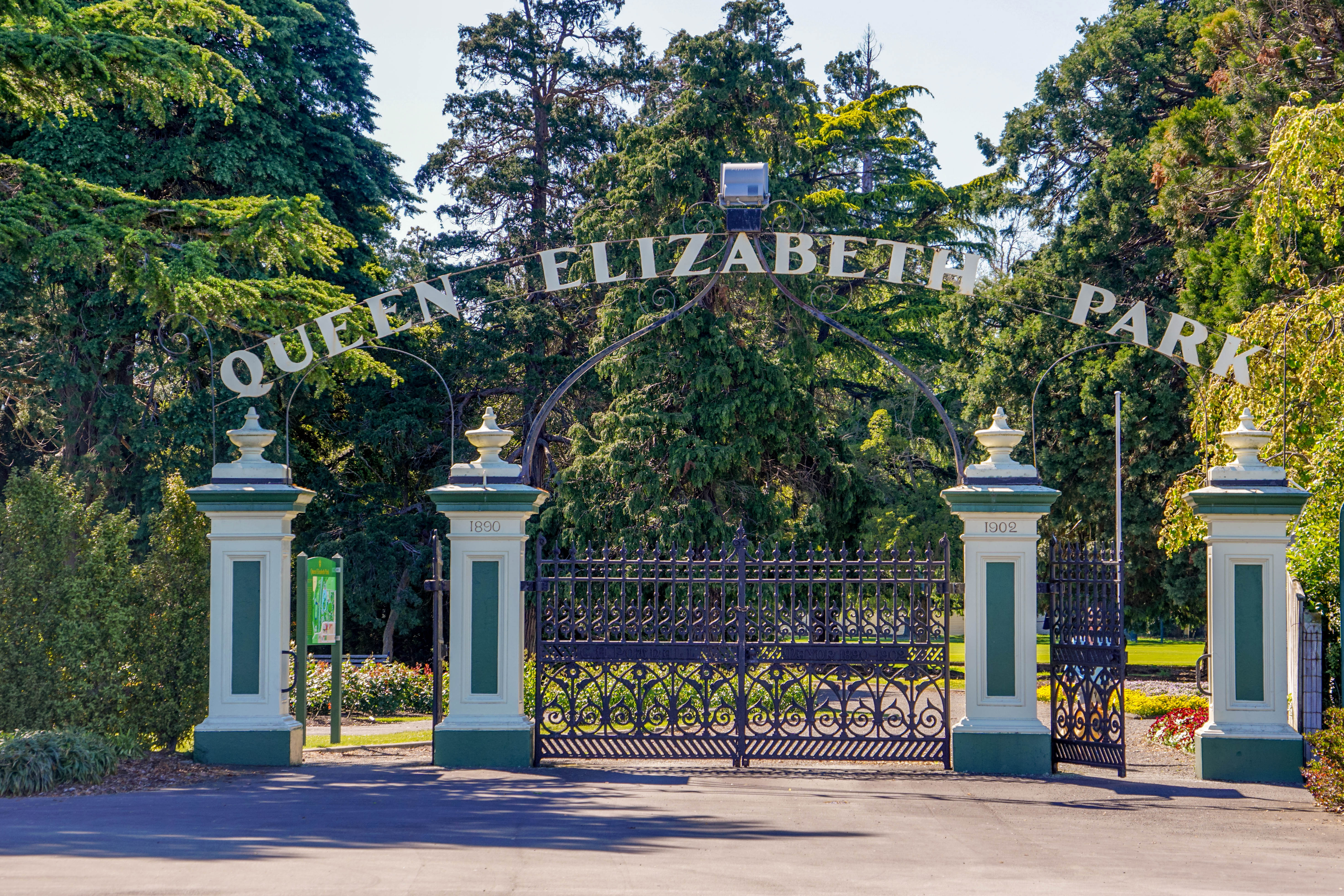
- Park entrance
- Interactive map of Queen Elizabeth Park

Ground information
- Location: Masterton, New Zealand
- Country: New Zealand
- Establishment: 1881

Team information
Central Districts Women	(2002–2010)
Central Districts	(1967–2005)
- As of 4 November 2011; Source: Ground profile

Queen Elizabeth Park is a park in Masterton, Wairarapa, New Zealand, located beside the Waipoua River. It was named Masterton Park until 1954, when it was renamed in honour of Queen Elizabeth II after her visit to Masterton. The park has gardens and a lake, as well as sports grounds, a large playground and a miniature railway.

== Cricket ground ==
The cricket ground in the park was developed for local cricket in 1881. The first major match at the ground was held in 1907 when Wairarapa played the touring Marylebone Cricket Club. In December 1910 the ground staged the first match in the inaugural season of the Hawke Cup, when Wairarapa hosted Manawatu.

The ground held its first first-class match during the 1966/67 Plunket Shield when Central Districts played Auckland. Between the 1966/67 and 2002/03 seasons, twelve first-class matches were held there, the last of which saw Central Districts play Wellington in the 2002/03 State Championship. Between the 1980/81 and 2004/05 season, Central Districts played five List A matches at Queen Elizabeth Park.

Central Districts Women used Queen Elizabeth Park as a home venue between 2002 and 2010. It is the home ground for the Wairarapa men's team that competes in the Hawke Cup, and the administrative offices of the Wairarapa Cricket Association are nearby.

== Miniature railway ==
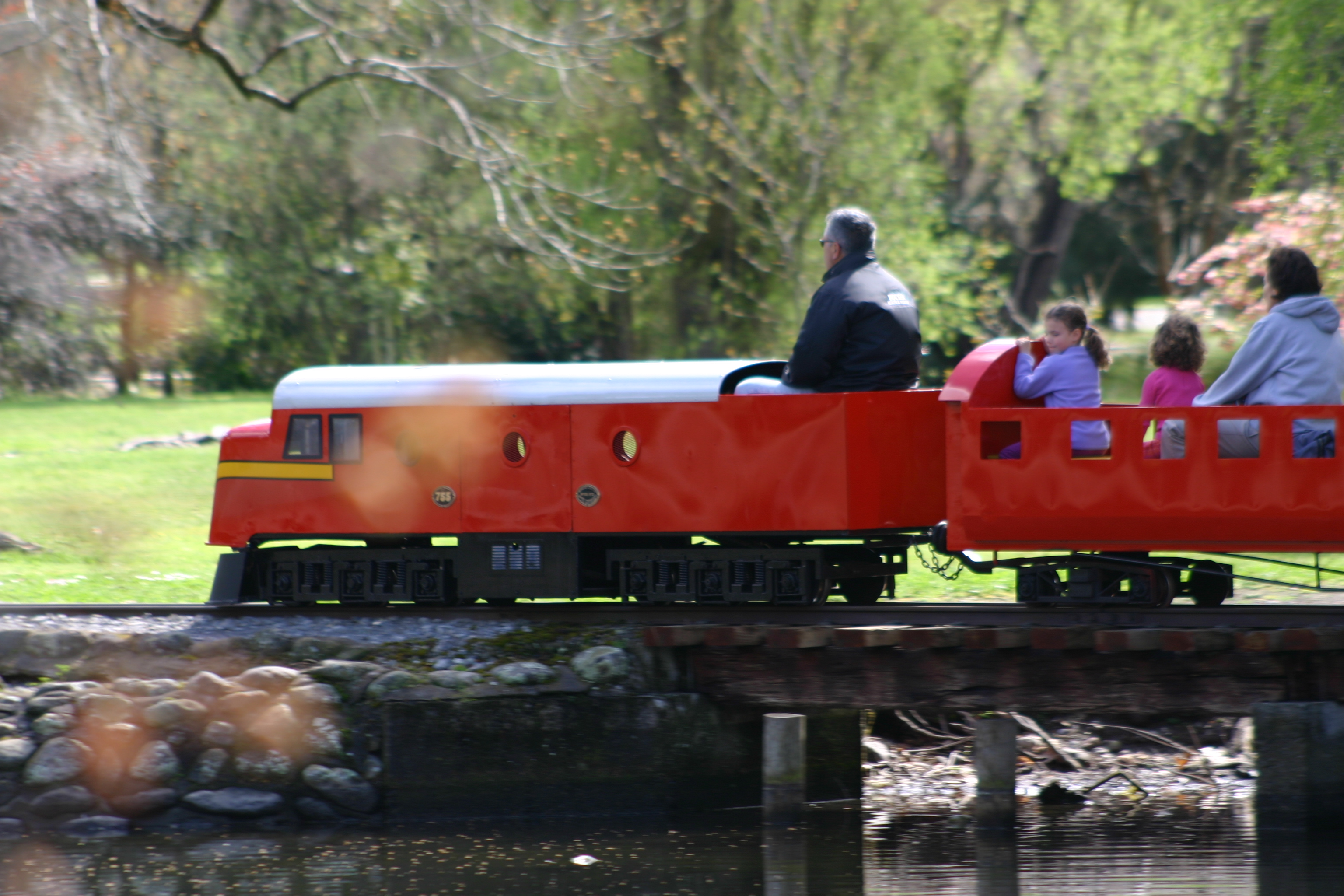
Queen Elizabeth Park Railway

The park contains a miniature railway, built by the Jaycees and opened in 1972 by Norman Kirk. It has a single station, Waipoua, and is upkept by a group of volunteers. A ride on the train costs $1, a fare that has been unchanged since 1984. The line has a steam locomotive, restored in 2021, which formerly operated at Gisborne and at Caroline Bay, Timaru, where a steam locomotive was operating in 1942. The locomotive's origin is unknown, though it is similar to many Atlantic steam engines built by Bassett-Lowke from 1911.

== Colin Pugh Sports Bowl ==
The park includes an athletics track with an all-weather surface, located on the eastern side of the Waipoua River. The facility was originally established as a grass track in the 1970s. In 1989 it was named after Colin Pugh, a former superintendent of parks in Masterton. An all-weather track was installed in 2012, and Olympic medallist Nick Willis took part in the inaugural meet on the new track in January 2013.
