= Ivan Sutherland (ethnologist) =

New Zealand ethnologist and university professor

Ivan Lorin George Sutherland (10 May 1897 – 21 or 22 February 1952) was a New Zealand ethnologist and university professor.

Sutherland was born in 1897 in Masterton. His father was a sawmill hand; both parents were active in The Salvation Army. Sutherland attended Masterton District High School but left before qualifying for further study to work for a bank. He moved to Wellington aged 19 become a minister for the Methodist church. He graduated from Victoria University College in 1918 and enrolled for the army, but fell ill and was discharged. He returned to Victoria University College and studied under Thomas Hunter, obtaining a Master of Arts. He then attended the University of Glasgow, where he obtained a PhD in 1924.

He returned to Wellington after graduating in Glasgow and eventually, Hunter secured an assistant position at Victoria University College, which turned into a lecturer's position.

Sutherland's sister, Olive Rose Sutherland was a notable teacher.

== Literature ==
- I. L. G. Sutherland 1897–1952. In: The Journal of the Polynesian Society. Volume 61, No. 1+2, 1952, p. 120–129
- Oliver Sutherland: Paikea: The Life of I. L. G. Sutherland. Canterbury University Press, 2013 ISBN 978-1-927145-43-2
