= Waipoua River (Wellington) =

- Swing bridge at Queen Elizabeth Park, Masterton
- Route of the Waipoua River
- Mouth of the Waipoua River Waipoua River (Wellington) (North Island)
- Native name: Waipoua (Māori)

Location
- Country: New Zealand
- Island: North Island
- Region: Wellington
- District: South Wairarapa

Physical characteristics
- Source: Harris (Blue Range, Tararua Range)
  - coordinates: 40.76306°S 175.55809°E
- Mouth: Ruamāhanga River
  - coordinates: 40°57′31″S 175°40′33″E
- Length: 26 km (16 mi)

Basin features
- Progression: Waipoua River → Ruamāhanga River → Lake Ōnoke → Lake Ōnoke Outlet → Palliser Bay → Cook Strait → Pacific Ocean
- Cities: Masterton
- Tributaries
  - right: Te Mara Stream, Kiriwhakapapa Stream, Mikimiki Stream, Wakamoekau Creek
- Bridges: Kiriwhakapapa Road Bridge, Mikimiki Road Bridge, Paierau Road Bridge, Wairarapa Line Railway Bridge, Whitipoua Bridge, Waipoua Bridge, Masterton Swing Bridge, Colombo Road Bridge

The Waipoua River is a river of the Wellington Region of New Zealand's North Island. It flows south from the eastern flanks of the Tararua Range, passing through the town of Masterton before reaching the Ruamāhanga River on the town's southeastern outskirts.

== See also ==
- List of rivers of Wellington Region
- List of rivers of New Zealand
