= Wairarapa cricket team =

New Zealand cricket team

Personnel
- Owner: Wairarapa Cricket Association

Team information
- Founded: 1894
- Home ground: Queen Elizabeth Park, Masterton

History
- Hawke Cup wins: 3
- Official website: Wairarapa Cricket Association

The Wairarapa cricket team represents the Wairarapa region of the North Island of New Zealand. It is one of the 21 teams from around New Zealand that compete in the Hawke Cup. Its base is in Masterton.

== Early history ==
Cricket has been played in the region since the mid-1860s. Festivities at Greytown on New Year's Day 1867 included men's and women's cricket matches – the first known instance of women's cricket in New Zealand. The Greytown Cricket Club was formed later that year.

The first Wairarapa Cricket Association was formed in the 1870s, based in Greytown. A second Wairarapa Cricket Association was formed in the late 1880s, based in Carterton, and not including Greytown. The current Wairarapa Cricket Association was formed in 1894, with seven clubs under a handicap system: Masterton and Greytown each fielded 11 players in a match, Carterton and Eketahuna had 13, Featherston, Matarawa, Greytown 2nd XI and Masterton 2nd XI had 15, and Morrison's Bush 16. The Association's inaugural president was the politician W. C. Buchanan. The first century in the competition was by Charlie Perry, who scored 110 for Midland (a Masterton team) against Greytown in February 1899.

The first visit by an overseas touring team was by Lord Hawke's XI in January 1903. They beat a Wairarapa XXII by an innings at the Recreation Reserve in Greytown. The Marylebone Cricket Club played a Wairarapa XV in February 1907, again winning by an innings, this time at the Park Oval in Masterton. The Association moved its headquarters to Masterton in 1907.

== Hawke Cup ==
The Hawke Cup began on 16 December 1910, when Wairarapa played in the first match, hosting Manawatu at the Park Oval in Masterton. Captained by Harry Moorhouse, they lost to Manawatu by 32 runs. They won the title for the first time in February 1921 when they beat Poverty Bay by two wickets, Ces Dacre guiding them to victory in a low-scoring match with 61 not out in the second innings. Their next title came 30 years later with a first-innings victory over Hawke's Bay by 21 runs. Murray Chapple scored 104 in Wairarapa's innings of 177.

Captained by Dermot Payton, Wairarapa took the title for the third time in February 1977, and held it through six challenges at Queen Elizabeth Park (the renamed Park Oval) until Nelson beat them in February 1979. The Test batsman Mike Shrimpton was a member of the team during this dominant period.

== Central Districts ==
Central Districts, of which Wairarapa is one of the eight constituent associations, began playing in the Plunket Shield in the 1950–51 season. Wairarapa's first player in the Central Districts team was Murray Chapple, who played in their inaugural Plunket Shield match.

The six Central Districts associations from the North Island compete for the Furlong Cup. The winner earns the right to challenge for the Hawke Cup.
