= Masterton =

Town in the North Island of New Zealand

Masterton Whakaoriori (Māori)
- Territorial authority district
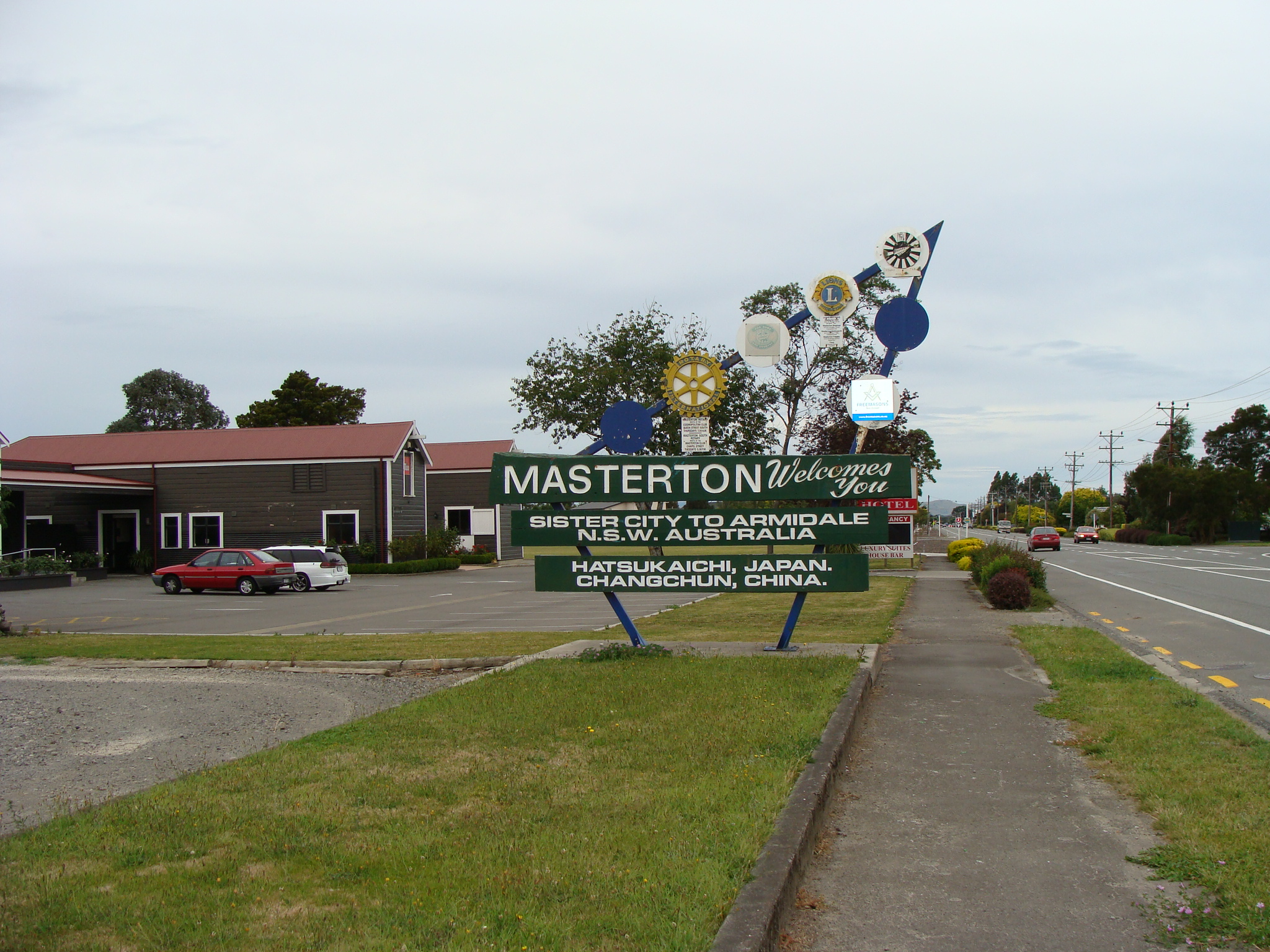

- Coat of arms

- Masterton district within the North Island
- Coordinates: 40°58′S 175°39′E
- Country: New Zealand
- Region: Greater Wellington
- District: Masterton District
- Town founded: 1854
- NZ Parliament: Ikaroa-Rāwhiti (Māori); Wairarapa

Government
  - Mayor: Bex Johnson
  - MPs: TBD (National); Cushla Tangaere-Manuel (Labour)
  - Territorial authority: Masterton District Council

Area
  - Territorial: 2,300.21 km^{2} (888.12 sq mi)
  - Urban: 22.45 km^{2} (8.67 sq mi)
- Elevation: 69 m (226 ft)

Population (June 2025)
  - Territorial: 28,900
  - Density: 12.6/km^{2} (32.5/sq mi)
  - Urban: 22,600
  - Urban density: 1,010/km^{2} (2,610/sq mi)
- Time zone: UTC+12 (NZST)
  - Summer (DST): UTC+13 (NZDT)
- Postcode: 5810
- Area code: 06
- Website: www.mstn.govt.nz

Masterton (Māori: Whakaoriori) is a town in the eponymous Masterton District of New Zealand. It serves as the seat of the Masterton District Council and is the largest town in the Wairarapa. It is situated on the Waipoua River between the Ruamāhunga and Waingawa Rivers and is 100 kilometres north-east of Wellington and 40 kilometres south of Eketāhuna.

Masterton has an urban population of 22,600, and a district population of 28,900 (June 2025).

Masterton businesses includes services for surrounding farmers. Three new industrial parks are being developed in Waingawa, Solway and Upper Plain. The town functions as the headquarters of the annual Golden Shears sheep-shearing competition.

== History ==
=== Early history ===
Masterton was established in 1854 by the Small Farms Association, a group led by Joseph Masters. The aim of the association was that groups of working men would pool their resources to purchase blocks of land from the government and subdivide them. Each member would own a small town section and a 40-acre farm. The town was named after Joseph Masters. The town initially grew slowly, but began to prosper as farming became more productive.

Masterton overtook Greytown as the main town in the Wairarapa in the 1870s, and became a borough in 1877. The railway line from Wellington reached Masterton in 1880, and for a time was the main line connecting Wellington to the rest of the North Island. The establishment of the rail connection led to Masterton becoming the main market and distribution centre for the Wairarapa region.

Waipoua timber mill was producing butter boxes as early as 1884.

In April 1965, one of the country's worst industrial accidents occurred at the General Plastics Factory on 170 Dixon Street.

During World War II two battalions of the United States Marine Corps were stationed in Masterton.

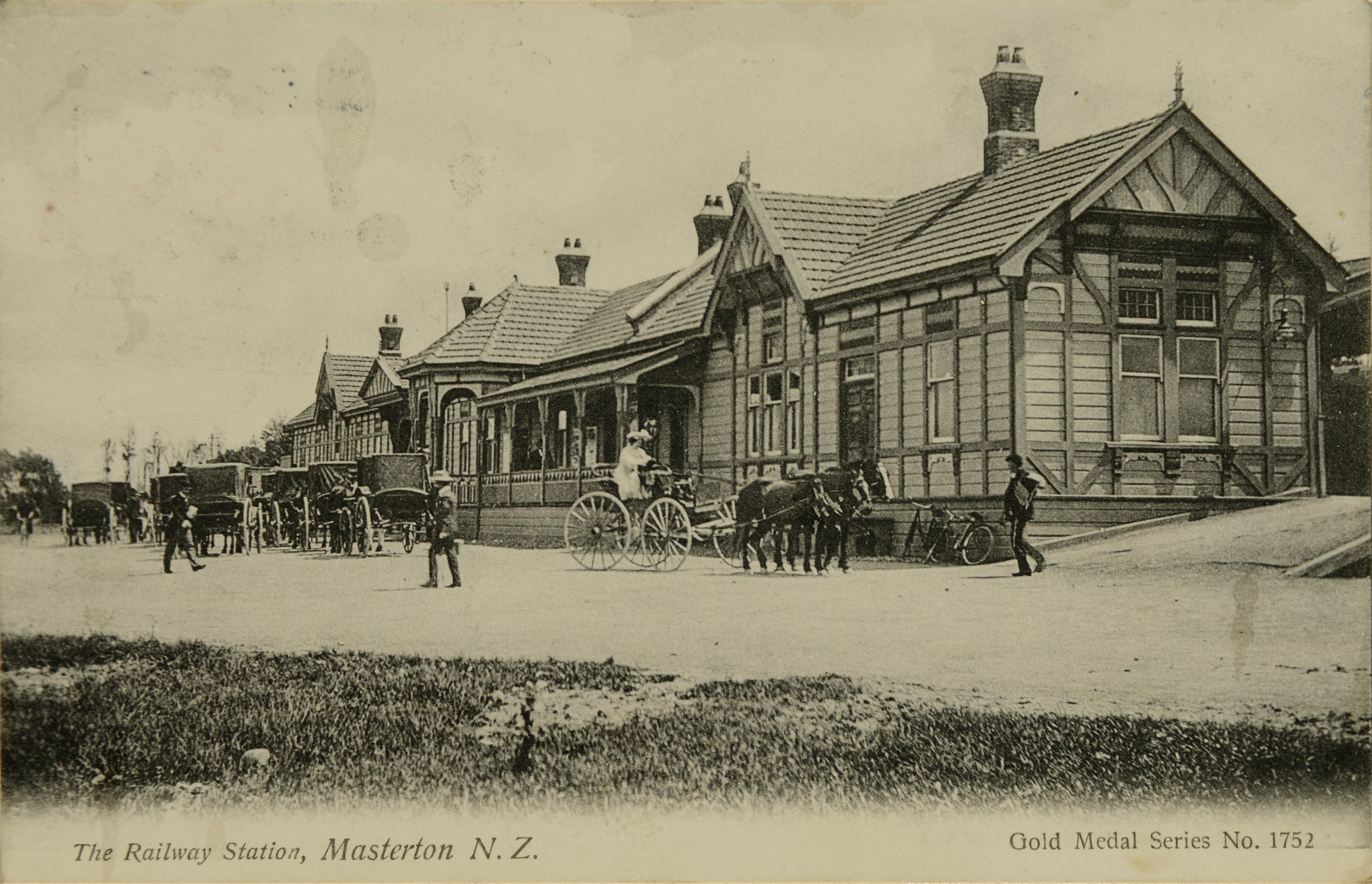
The railway station opened 1880, demolished 1967

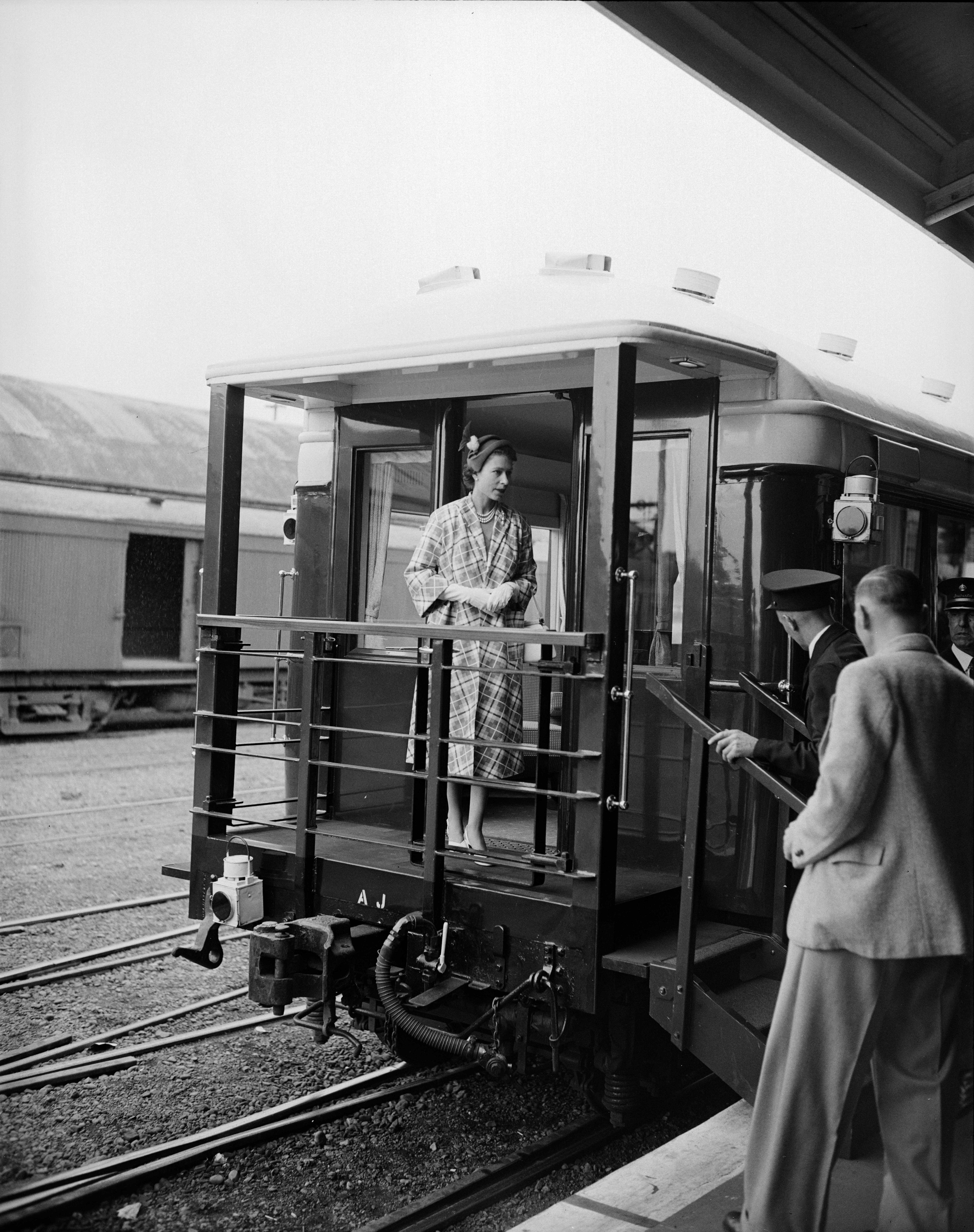
Railway station, 15 January 1954

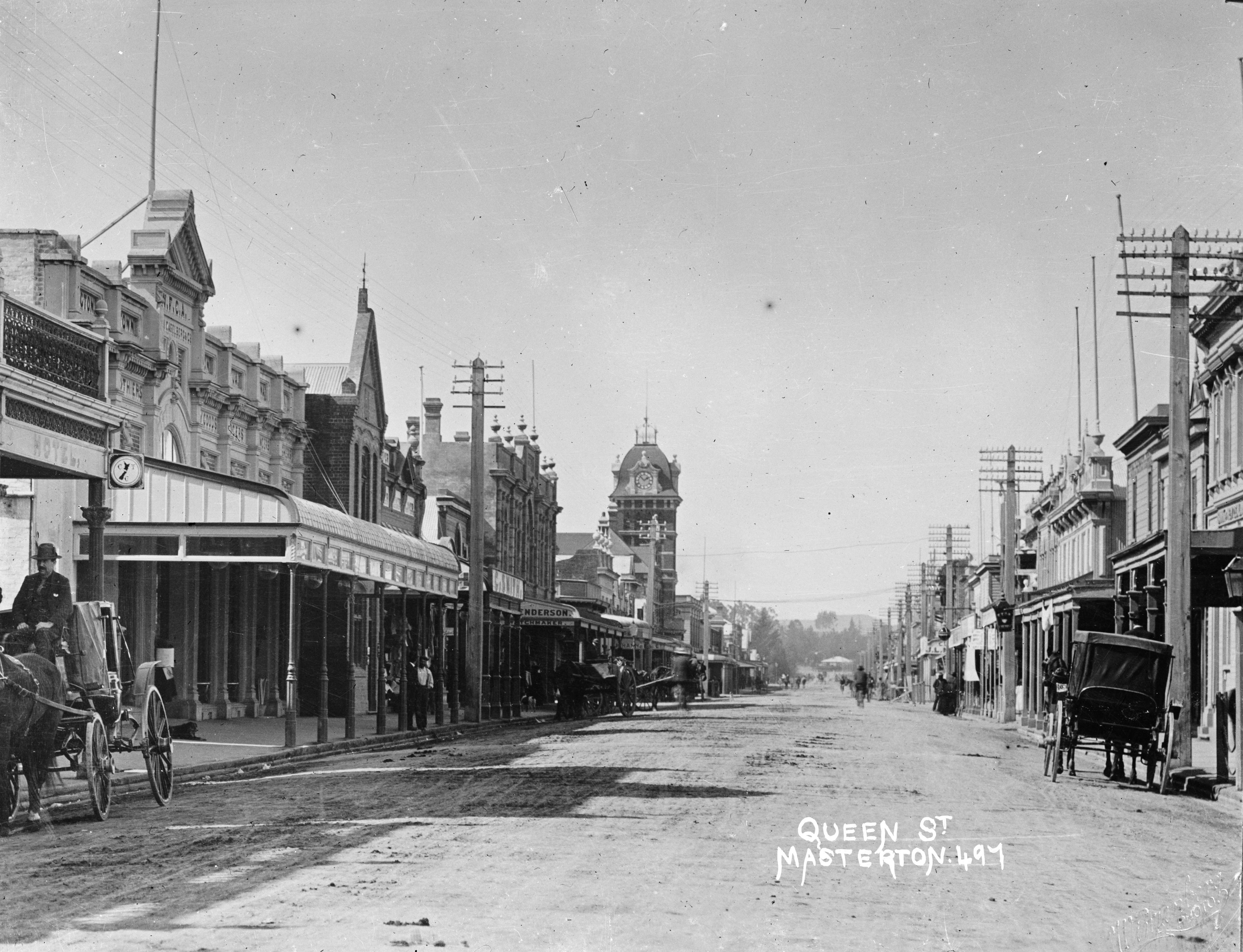
Queen Street in the early 1900s

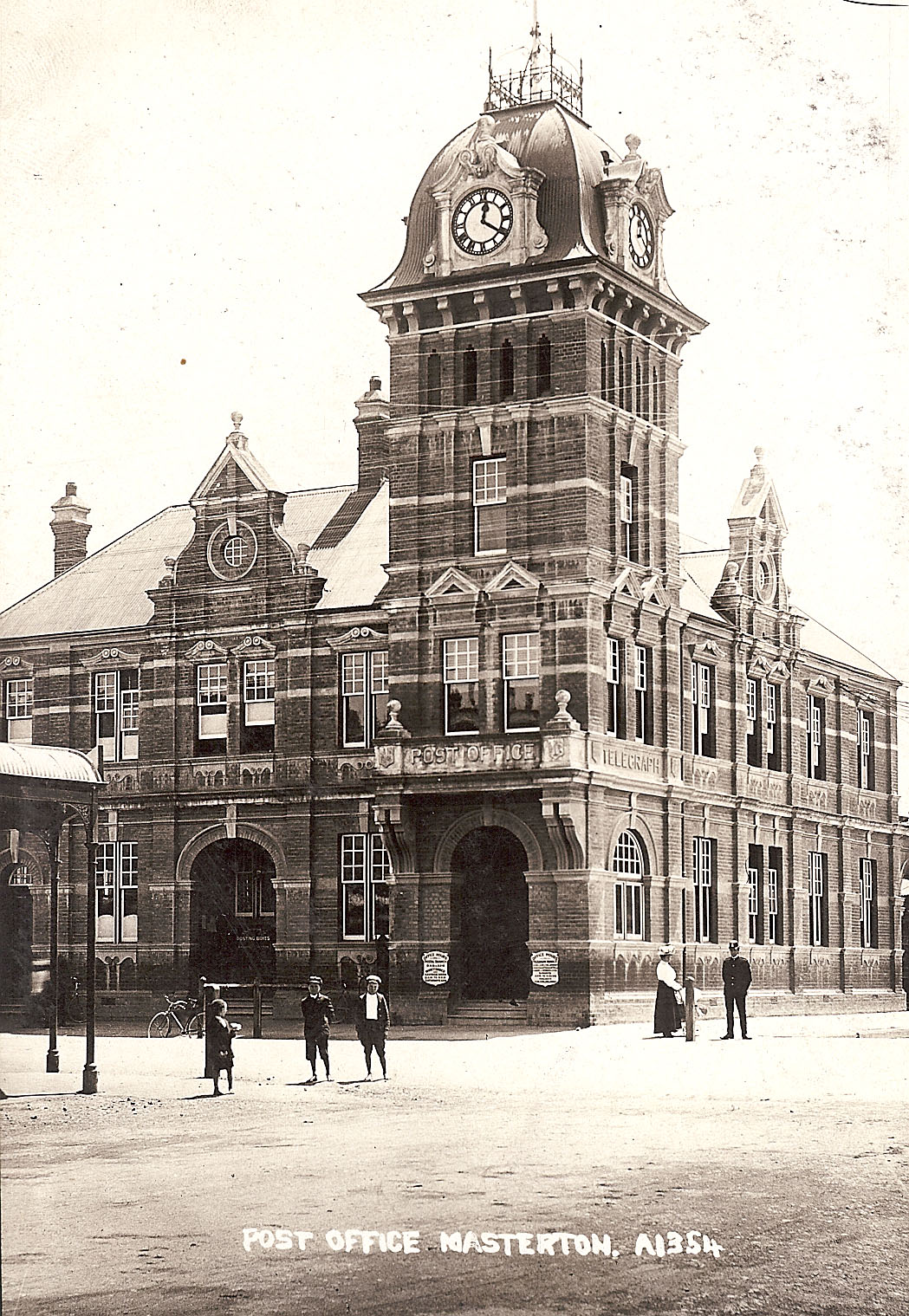
The Post Office opened 1900, demolished 1960

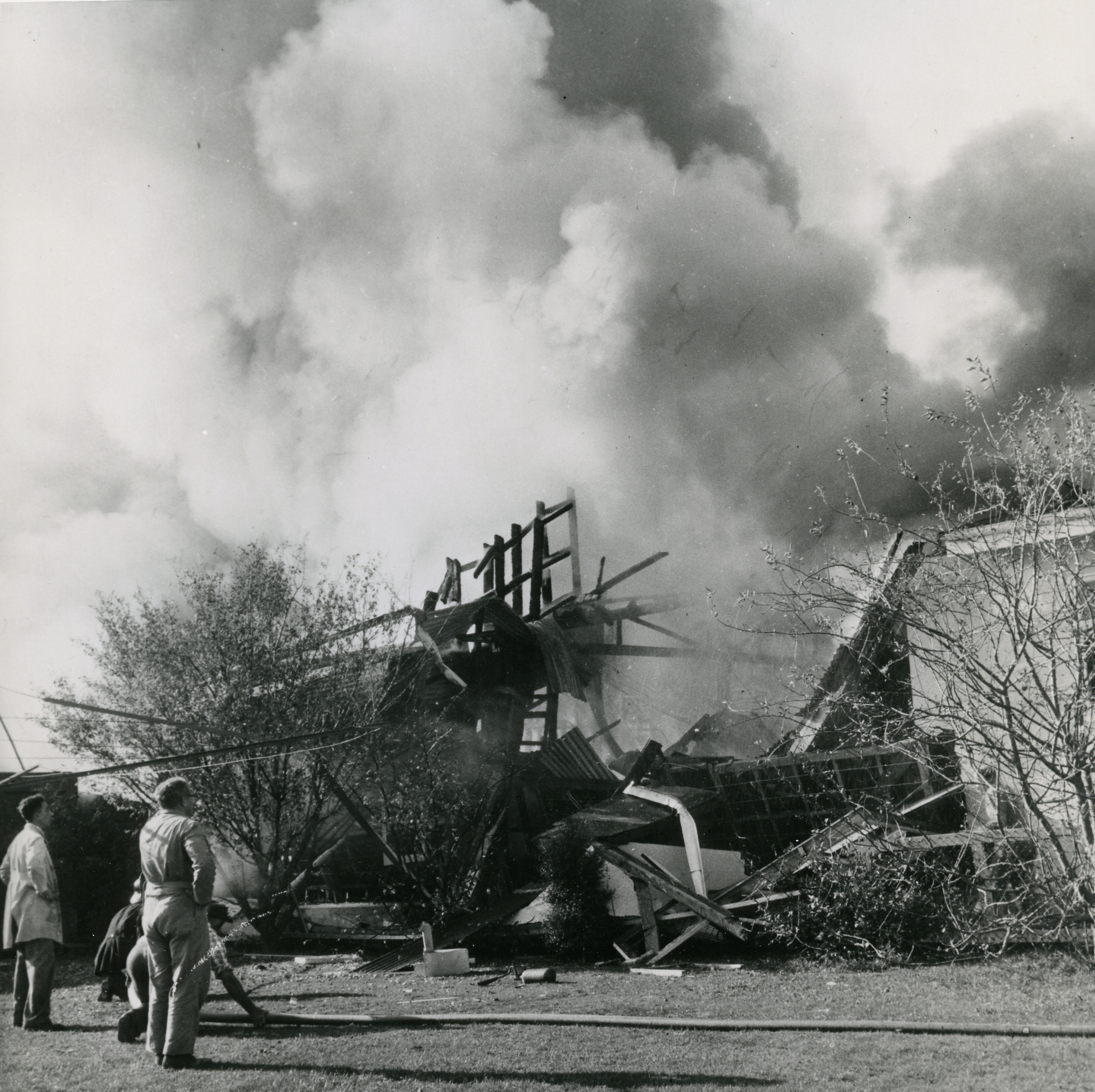
4 killed in the General Plastics Explosion and Fire 1965

=== Modern history ===
In essence, providing support services for rural industry – living off the sheep's back – Masterton's real growth ended with that sector's retrenchment after the 1974 British entry to the trade and political grouping now the European Union. Efforts to decentralise industry to New Zealand's provinces gave Masterton a print works and some other industries, but the lost economic activity was not restored.

In the 1970s, there was a period of decline as people and businesses moved to take up opportunities elsewhere. Government deregulation and the lifting of protective tariffs in the 1980s led to more business closures and further decline.

Masterton did not quite qualify to be a city by 1989 when the minimum population requirement for that status was lifted from 20,000 to 50,000.

=== Marae ===
The Te Ore Ore marae was built in 1881 by Pāora Te Pōtangaroa and opened in 1881. The original building was destroyed in 1939 but was later rebuilt. The marae is located in Te Oreore near Masterton and is one of the main marae for Masterton. The marae is affiliated with Ngāti Hamua, a sub-tribe of Rangitāne.

== Geography ==
=== Setting ===
Masterton is situated on mainly flat land in the north of the Wairarapa region. It is in the upper drainage basin of the Ruamāhanga River, and sits between the Waingawa River to the west and the Ruamāhanga to the east. The Waipoua River passes through the town, flowing south to join the Ruamāhanga River near the south-eastern boundary of the town. There are low hills to the north, and the foothills of the Tararua Ranges rise approximately 12 km (7.5 mi) to the west. The country to the east becomes hilly and undulating within 8 km (5.0 mi).

=== Suburbs ===
Masterton suburbs include:

- Lansdowne, on the northern side
- Eastside and Homebush on the eastern side
- Upper Plain, Fernridge, Ngaumutawa, Ākura and Masterton West on the western side
- Kuripuni and Solway on the southern side

=== Climate ===
Masterton enjoys a mild temperate climate (Köppen: Cfb), grading towards a Mediterranean climate (Köppen: Csb). Due to the geography of the Wairarapa valley and the Tararua Range directly to the west, the town's temperature fluctuates more than the nearby inland city of Palmerston North. Masterton experiences warmer, dry summers with highs above 30 °C possible and colder winters with frequent frost and lows below 0 °C.

Climate data for Masterton (1991–2020 normals, extremes 1906–present)
Month	Jan	Feb	Mar	Apr	May	Jun	Jul	Aug	Sep	Oct	Nov	Dec	Year
Record high °C (°F)	35.6 (96.1)	35.1 (95.2)	34.4 (93.9)	29.9 (85.8)	27.3 (81.1)	22.2 (72.0)	21.9 (71.4)	21.9 (71.4)	26.0 (78.8)	28.4 (83.1)	31.3 (88.3)	35.1 (95.2)	35.6 (96.1)
Mean daily maximum °C (°F)	25.3 (77.5)	25.1 (77.2)	22.6 (72.7)	19.3 (66.7)	16.3 (61.3)	12.9 (55.2)	12.9 (55.2)	14.1 (57.4)	16.0 (60.8)	18.3 (64.9)	20.4 (68.7)	22.7 (72.9)	18.8 (65.8)
Daily mean °C (°F)	18.7 (65.7)	18.5 (65.3)	16.5 (61.7)	13.5 (56.3)	11.1 (52.0)	8.5 (47.3)	8.0 (46.4)	9.1 (48.4)	10.9 (51.6)	12.7 (54.9)	14.5 (58.1)	16.9 (62.4)	13.2 (55.8)
Mean daily minimum °C (°F)	12.1 (53.8)	11.8 (53.2)	10.3 (50.5)	7.7 (45.9)	5.8 (42.4)	4.1 (39.4)	3.1 (37.6)	4.1 (39.4)	5.8 (42.4)	7.1 (44.8)	8.6 (47.5)	11.0 (51.8)	7.6 (45.7)
Record low °C (°F)	−1.1 (30.0)	0.5 (32.9)	−2.2 (28.0)	−3.3 (26.1)	−4.6 (23.7)	−6.9 (19.6)	−7.0 (19.4)	−6.9 (19.6)	−4.6 (23.7)	−3.9 (25.0)	−2.2 (28.0)	−0.6 (30.9)	−7.0 (19.4)
Average rainfall mm (inches)	52.4 (2.06)	48.5 (1.91)	69.9 (2.75)	71.5 (2.81)	72.9 (2.87)	91.0 (3.58)	113.6 (4.47)	81.7 (3.22)	73.2 (2.88)	82.0 (3.23)	71.9 (2.83)	60.6 (2.39)	889.2 (35)
Average rainy days (≥ 1.0 mm)	5.2	4.7	6.2	8.5	10.3	9.9	10.6	11.8	10.7	9.2	8.5	6.9	102.5
Average relative humidity (%)	76.0	82.9	84.2	87.0	89.5	91.3	91.1	89.6	83.5	79.0	78.8	76.9	84.2
Mean monthly sunshine hours	232.2	197.0	180.0	159.7	139.5	106.1	115.3	156.0	165.8	204.3	200.9	220.1	2,076.9
Source: NIWA Climate Data (humidity 1981–2010)

== Government ==
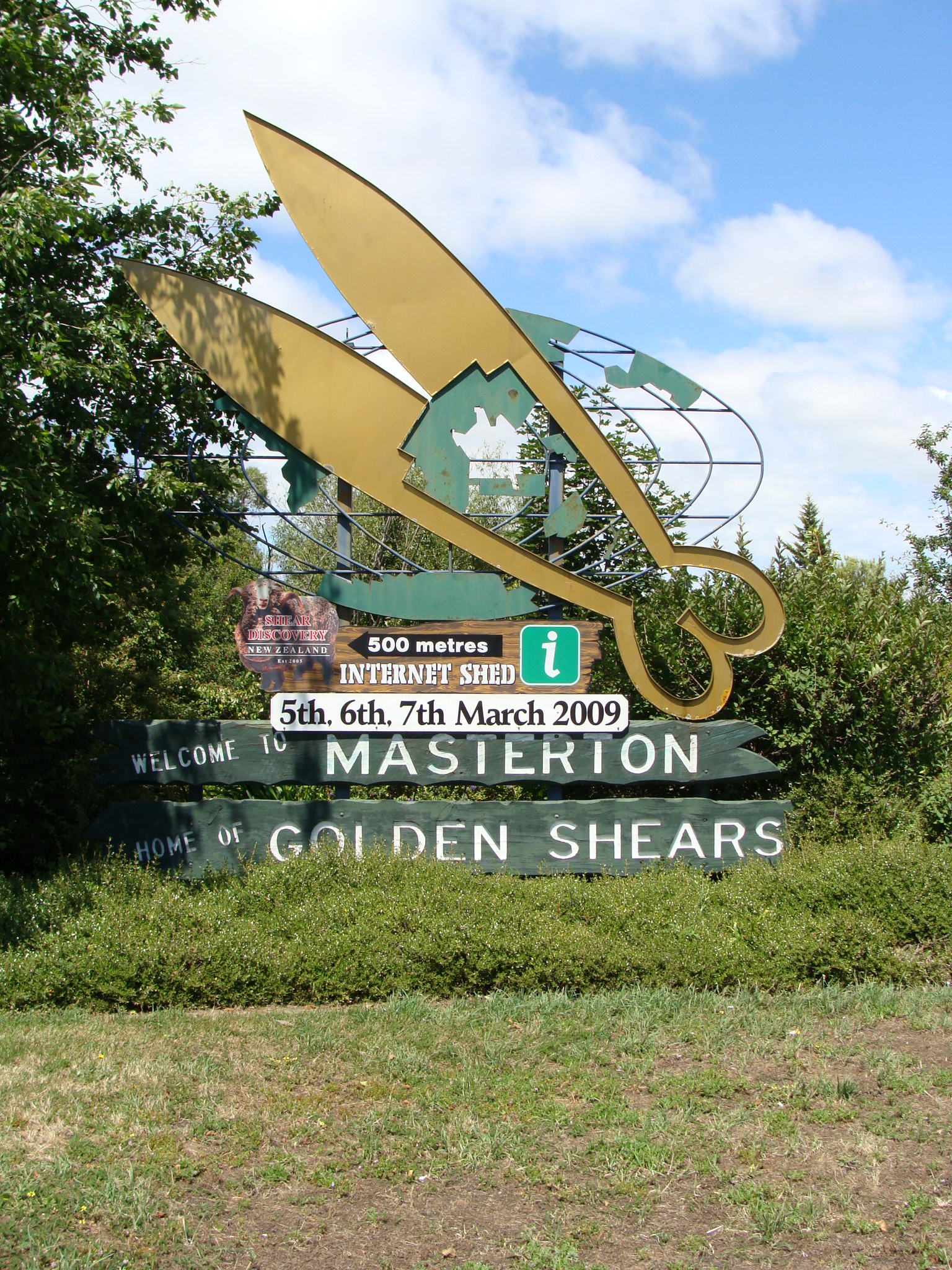
Golden Shears sign

Between 1877 and 1989, Masterton Borough Council administered the area. An early mayor was the storekeeper Myer Caselberg (1886–1888).

The Masterton District Council (MDC) is the Masterton District territorial authority. It is made up of an elected mayor, a deputy mayor/councillor, and seven additional councillors. They are elected under the First Past the Post system in triennial elections, with the last election being held on Saturday 11 October 2025.

The current council members are: Bex Johnson (M), Craig Bowyer (DM), Gary Caffell, Waireka Collings, Tim Nelson, Brent Goodwin, Stella Lennox, David Holmes. At-large councillor Jamie Falloon resigned at the beginning of February 2026. In the by-election triggered by Falloon's resignation, former council senior manager Andrea Jackson was elected.

Nationally, Masterton is part of the Wairarapa general electorate and the Ikaroa-Rāwhiti Māori electorate.

=== Politics 2013 to 2016 ===
Applications for local government reorganisation from the Greater Wellington Regional Council and the Wairarapa district councils in mid-2013 led to a proposal from the Local Government Commission for a region-wide unitary authority. In June 2015, the Commission decided not to proceed with this proposal due to lack of public support. Instead, because about 40 per cent of submissions suggested alternatives to the status quo, the Commission decided to work with councils and the community to achieve some consensus on the challenges it faced, and to collaborate in identifying possible options to address the challenges.

== Demographics ==
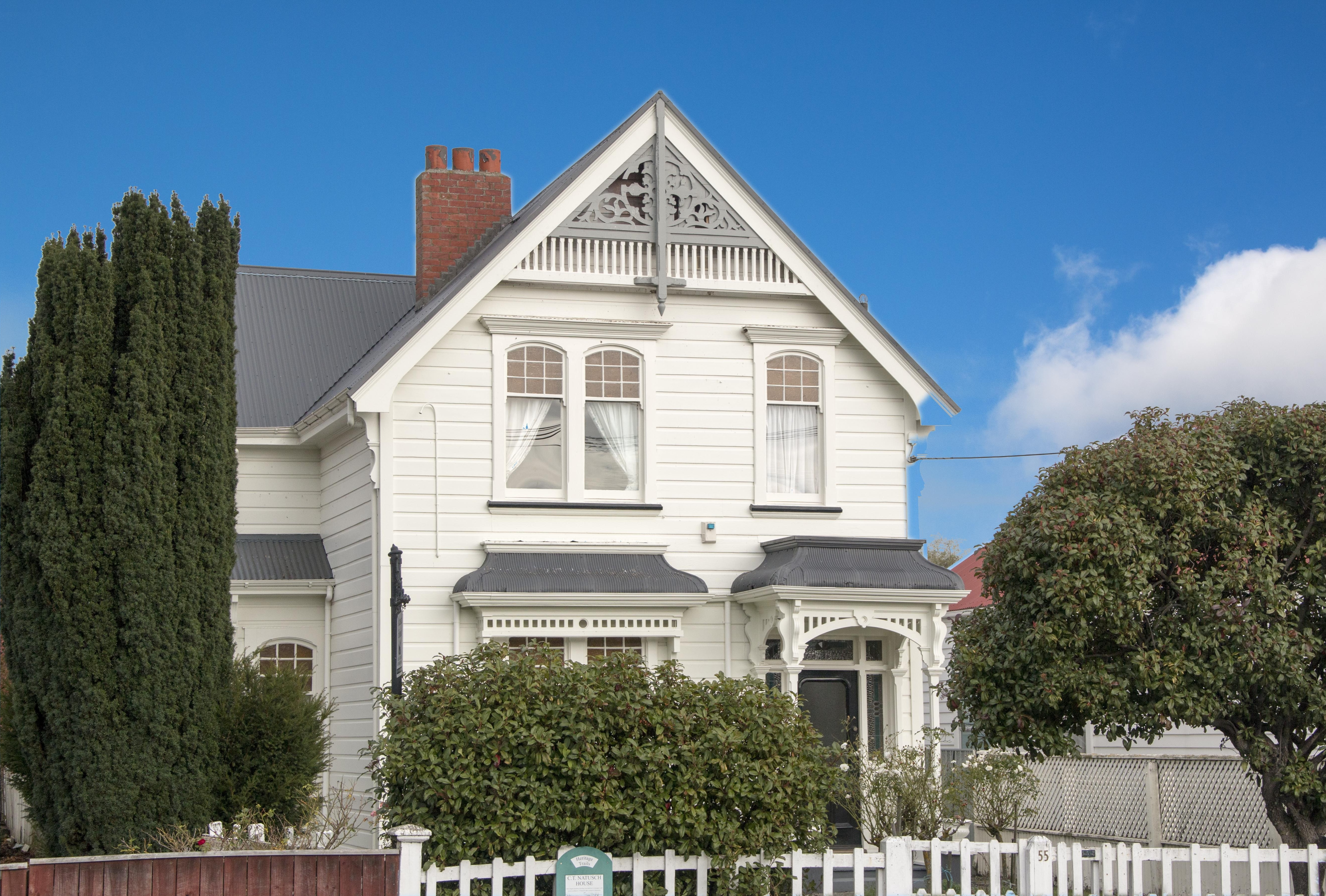
House for his family by architect Charles Natusch builders C E Daniell

Masterton District covers 2,300.21 km^{2} (888.12 sq mi) and had an estimated population of 28,900 as of June 2025, with a population density of 13 people per km^{2}. The Masterton urban area covers 22.45 km^{2} (8.67 sq mi) and had an estimated population of 22,600 as of June 2025, with a population density of 1,007 people per km^{2}.

Historical population for the Masterton District
Year	Pop.	±% p.a.
1996	22,755	—
2001	22,614	−0.12%
2006	22,623	+0.01%
2013	23,352	+0.45%
2018	25,557	+1.82%
2023	27,678	+1.61%

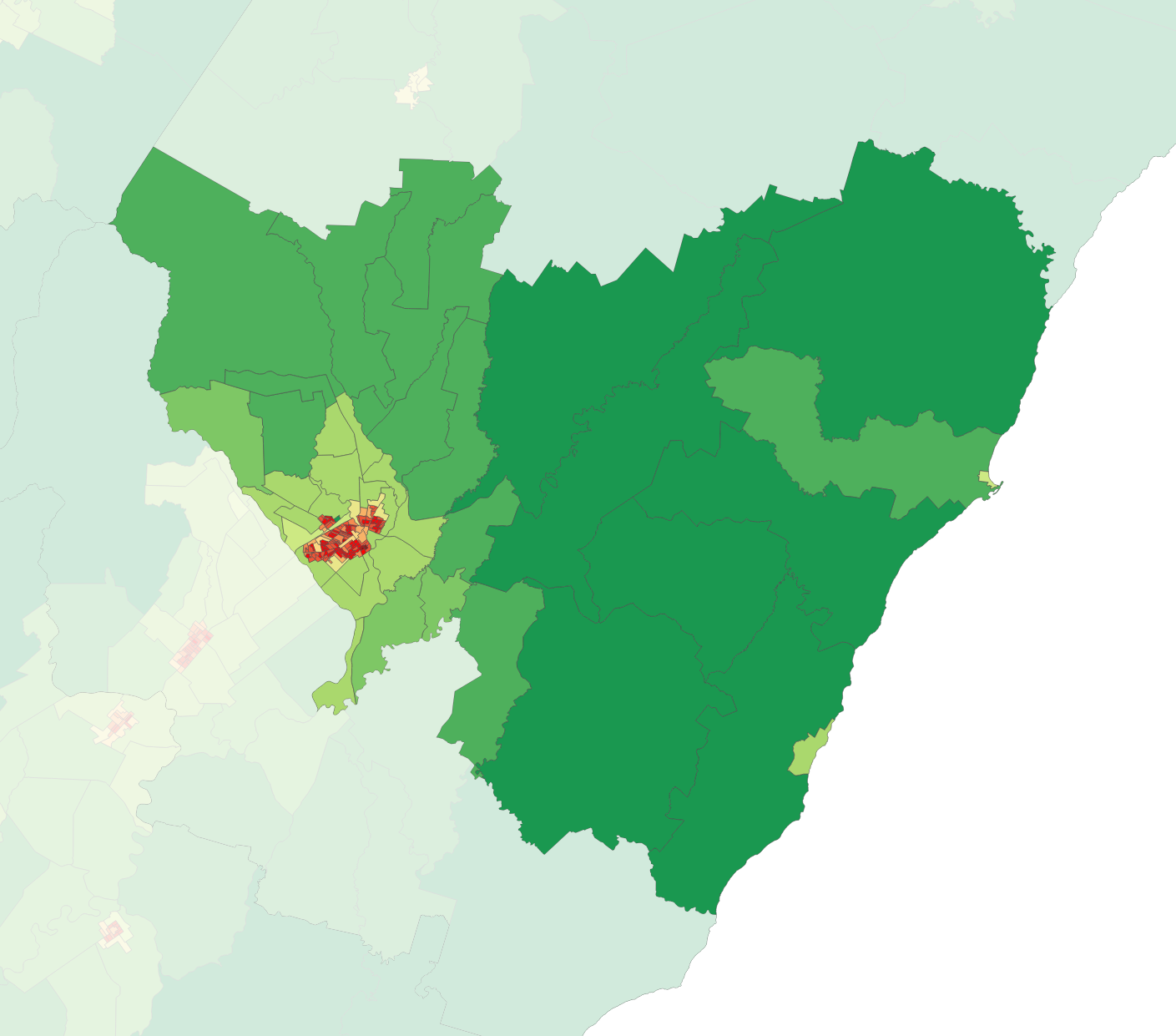
Population density in the 2023 census

Masterton District had a population of 27,678 in the 2023 New Zealand census, an increase of 2,121 people (8.3%) since the 2018 census, and an increase of 4,326 people (18.5%) since the 2013 census. There were 13,401 males, 14,175 females and 102 people of other genders in 10,911 dwellings. 2.7% of people identified as LGBTIQ+. The median age was 42.7 years (compared with 38.1 years nationally). There were 5,127 people (18.5%) aged under 15 years, 4,635 (16.7%) aged 15 to 29, 11,637 (42.0%) aged 30 to 64, and 6,276 (22.7%) aged 65 or older.

People could identify as more than one ethnicity. The results were 83.7% European (Pākehā); 22.6% Māori; 4.6% Pasifika; 5.1% Asian; 0.5% Middle Eastern, Latin American and African New Zealanders (MELAA); and 2.5% other, which includes people giving their ethnicity as "New Zealander". English was spoken by 97.4%, Māori language by 4.7%, Samoan by 1.2% and other languages by 6.3%. No language could be spoken by 1.9% (e.g. too young to talk). New Zealand Sign Language was known by 0.5%. The percentage of people born overseas was 14.7, compared with 28.8% nationally.

Religious affiliations were 32.5% Christian, 0.8% Hindu, 0.4% Islam, 1.2% Māori religious beliefs, 0.4% Buddhist, 0.5% New Age, 0.1% Jewish, and 1.2% other religions. People who answered that they had no religion were 55.5%, and 7.6% of people did not answer the census question.

Of those at least 15 years old, 2,976 (13.2%) people had a bachelor's or higher degree, 12,756 (56.6%) had a post-high school certificate or diploma, and 5,898 (26.2%) people exclusively held high school qualifications. The median income was $37,200, compared with $41,500 nationally. 1,794 people (8.0%) earned over $100,000 compared to 12.1% nationally. The employment status of those at least 15 was that 10,590 (47.0%) people were employed full-time, 3,300 (14.6%) were part-time, and 543 (2.4%) were unemployed.

=== Urban area ===
Masterton's urban area covers 22.45 km^{2} (8.67 sq mi) and had an estimated population of 22,600 as of June 2025, with a population density of 1,007 people per km^{2}.

Historical population for the Masterton urban area
Year	Pop.	±% p.a.
2013	18,246	—
2018	19,917	+1.77%
2023	21,606	+1.64%

The urban area had a population of 21,606 in the 2023 New Zealand census, an increase of 1,689 people (8.5%) since the 2018 census, and an increase of 3,360 people (18.4%) since the 2013 census. There were 10,323 males, 11,205 females and 78 people of other genders in 8,631 dwellings. 2.9% of people identified as LGBTIQ+. The median age was 41.3 years (compared with 38.1 years nationally). There were 4,023 people (18.6%) aged under 15 years, 3,810 (17.6%) aged 15 to 29, 8,832 (40.9%) aged 30 to 64, and 4,941 (22.9%) aged 65 or older.

People could identify as more than one ethnicity. The results were 81.0% European (Pākehā); 25.1% Māori; 5.3% Pasifika; 6.1% Asian; 0.5% Middle Eastern, Latin American and African New Zealanders (MELAA); and 2.4% other, which includes people giving their ethnicity as "New Zealander". English was spoken by 97.2%, Māori language by 5.3%, Samoan by 1.5% and other languages by 6.6%. No language could be spoken by 2.0% (e.g. too young to talk). New Zealand Sign Language was known by 0.5%. The percentage of people born overseas was 14.8, compared with 28.8% nationally.

Religious affiliations were 33.1% Christian, 1.0% Hindu, 0.5% Islam, 1.4% Māori religious beliefs, 0.4% Buddhist, 0.5% New Age, 0.1% Jewish, and 1.3% other religions. People who answered that they had no religion were 54.3%, and 7.6% of people did not answer the census question.

Of those at least 15 years old, 2,124 (12.1%) people had a bachelor's or higher degree, 9,903 (56.3%) had a post-high school certificate or diploma, and 4,926 (28.0%) people exclusively held high school qualifications. The median income was $35,800, compared with $41,500 nationally. 1,143 people (6.5%) earned over $100,000 compared to 12.1% nationally. The employment status of those at least 15 was that 8,061 (45.8%) people were employed full-time, 2,406 (13.7%) were part-time, and 459 (2.6%) were unemployed.

== Amenities and attractions ==
=== Queen Elizabeth Park ===
Queen Elizabeth Park covers more than 20 hectares (49 acres) near the heart of Masterton on land set aside for the purpose in 1854. Its most notable aspects are the Giant Sequoia (Sequoiadendron giganteum) trees planted in 1875, its other mature trees, and sheltered oval cricket ground. Queen Elizabeth came to Masterton Park in 1954 to be noisily welcomed by the mayor and the citizens and every schoolchild of the Wairarapa. After that, she rested at the Empire hotel, waved to the crowd from the balcony and gave her own name for the park. The park contains a miniature railway, built by the Jaycees and opened in 1972 by Norman Kirk.

=== Museum ===
Aratoi Wairarapa Museum of Art and History opened in Masterton in 1969. A sculpture by Barbara Hepworth was the first item in the museum's collection. It now contains almost 4,000 items.

=== Library ===
The Masterton District Library and Archive, situated on Queen Street, are part of the Lower North Island SMART Libraries group, which involves sharing books and information between 22 libraries.

== Sports ==
In rugby union, Heartland Championship team Wairarapa Bush is based in Masterton, playing their home games at Memorial Park.

In association football, Central Premier League side Wairarapa United play some of their home games at Masterton; also playing in Carterton.

In cricket, the Hawke Cup team Wairarapa have their headquarters in Masterton. Their home ground is Queen Elizabeth Park.

Masterton has an all-weather athletics track at the Colin Pugh Sports Bowl in Lansdowne.

A motorcycle speedway track known as Penlee Speedway existed on the Norfolk Road during the 1970s and 1980s. It opened in November 1971 and was a significant venue for important speedway events, including the final of the New Zealand Solo Championship in 1978 and 1984.

== Infrastructure ==
=== Water and drainage ===
==== Water supply ====
Masterton's water is piped from the Waingawa through a Masterton District Council treatment plant on the river, about 10 kilometres west of the town. The water is clarified and filtered, then chlorinated and fluoridated. Lime is added to neutralise the pH to protect the pipes. There is a fluoride-free drinking water tap in Manuka Reserve in Manuka Street.

Typhoid epidemics broke out each year in Masterton and in 1896 Parliament approved a Borough Council loan to build a drainage and water supply system. Work on the water supply did not begin until 1899 delayed by disagreements over the appropriate sources for water. It was finished at the end of 1900 when at the formal opening ceremony there was enough pressure to send a jet right over the Post Office tower to the accompaniment of the Masterton Municipal Brass Band. The mayor, Mr Pownall, said he was now ready to pour cold water on the scheme's opponents. A covered reservoir and treatment plant at Fernridge was supplied by an intake from springs beside the Waingawa four miles further up river. The main was duplicated in 1915. It was replaced by the current system, completed in 1983.

==== Wastewater ====
A sewage system was completed in 1901. It drained through settlement ponds and filter beds to the Ruamāhanga River south of the town. The sewage farm's system included a newfangled "septic tank" which was subject to failures.

In 2012, after a period of heavy rain, eels were found in a Masterton street. In 2013, when the existing treatment pond at the Homebush wastewater treatment plant was being replaced with a new pond, the council had to relocate an estimated 85,000 eels that were living in the old pond. Around half of the eels (about 20 tonnes), were rescued by the iwi Ngati Kahungunu for relocation into other Wairarapa lakes and streams.

In March 2022, following periods of heavy rain, high levels of groundwater infiltration into the sewage network led to the emergency discharge of treated sewage into the Ruamāhanga River from the Homebush wastewater treatment plant for a period of one week. In April 2023, the council was strongly criticised for continuing incidents of overflow of raw sewage into properties in Cockburn Street during periods of heavy rain, a recurring problem that dates from 2006.

=== Energy ===
The Wairarapa Electric Power Board was established in Carterton in 1920 (Note: With nine members, two from Masterton Borough and one each from Carterton Borough, Greytown Borough, Featherston Borough, Martinborough Town District and portion of Masterton County, a portion of Wairarapa South County, and a portion of Featherston County. Wairarapa Age, 10 April 1920, page 4) to supply the Wairarapa with electricity from the Kourarau hydropower station at Gladstone, southeast of both towns. Masterton was connected to Mangahao on 17 May 1925 when the transmission line from Bunnythorpe to Masterton (via Woodville and Mangamaire) and the Masterton substation were commissioned. The Wairarapa Electric Power Board moved to headquarters in Masterton in the 1950s. The power board, then named Wairarapa Electricity, dissolved following the 1998 electricity sector reforms. The retail business was sold to Genesis Energy and the distribution lines business sold to Powerco. Today Powerco continues to operate the local distribution network in the town and surrounding district with electricity fed from Transpower's national grid at its Masterton substation in Waingawa.

Masterton Gas Company was established by the Borough Council in 1886 by the corner of Bannister and Kirton Streets. About 20 years later it was moved to the end of Bentley Street, just south of the railway station. The large quantities of coal were brought in by rail. By 1945 it had become clear consumers preferred electricity and the gasworks closed in the 1950s.

There is no natural gas network in Masterton, making it the largest North Island urban area without one. There has been no more than a proposal to connect Masterton to the North Island natural gas network via a branch off the Palmerston North to Hastings high-pressure pipeline, commissioned in 1983.

=== Communications ===
The Masterton magneto telephone exchange opened on 31 January 1897, with 53 subscribers. On 31 May 1919, Masterton became the first town in New Zealand to have a fully automatic (Western Electric 7A Rotary) telephone exchange. Masterton and nearby Carterton were the first towns in New Zealand to introduce the emergency number 111, in September 1958. On 3 December 2015 the UFB rollout to the town was completed.

== Transport ==
Masterton is served by public transport, with rail and bus links. Despite Masterton and the Wairarapa valley being reasonably close to Wellington, they are separated by the Rimutaka Ranges with State Highway 2 cutting a winding hill road through the range, and the Rimutaka railway tunnel. The Wairarapa Line railway allows access to Wellington, Lower Hutt and Upper Hutt.

Unlike other parts of the country, the Wairarapa has seen passenger rail services remain, largely due to its proximity to Wellington and the Rimutaka Tunnel's advantage over the Rimutaka Hill road. There has been talk of constructing a road tunnel through the ranges for decades, but this has been ruled out due to the extremely high cost. According to the latest transportation plan from the Greater Wellington Regional Council, the only work planned is for upgrades to the Rimutaka Hill road and the addition of passing lanes between Featherston and Masterton.

=== Rail ===
Masterton is linked to Wellington and the Hutt Valley by the Wairarapa Connection, a Tranz Metro passenger service run for Greater Wellington Region's Metlink, primarily operating at peak times serving commuters from Masterton and the Wairarapa with five return services on Monday to Thursday, six on Friday and two at weekends and public holidays. There are three railway stations in the town; Masterton, Renall Street and Solway. Four stations north of Masterton used to operate at Opaki, Kopuranga, Mauriceville and Mangamahoe. Services to these stations ceased between 1969 and 1988. To cope with an increase in logging in the Wairarapa, an additional 2.5 hectare rail freight hub has been operational in Norfolk Road, Waingawa since March 2016.

=== Bus ===
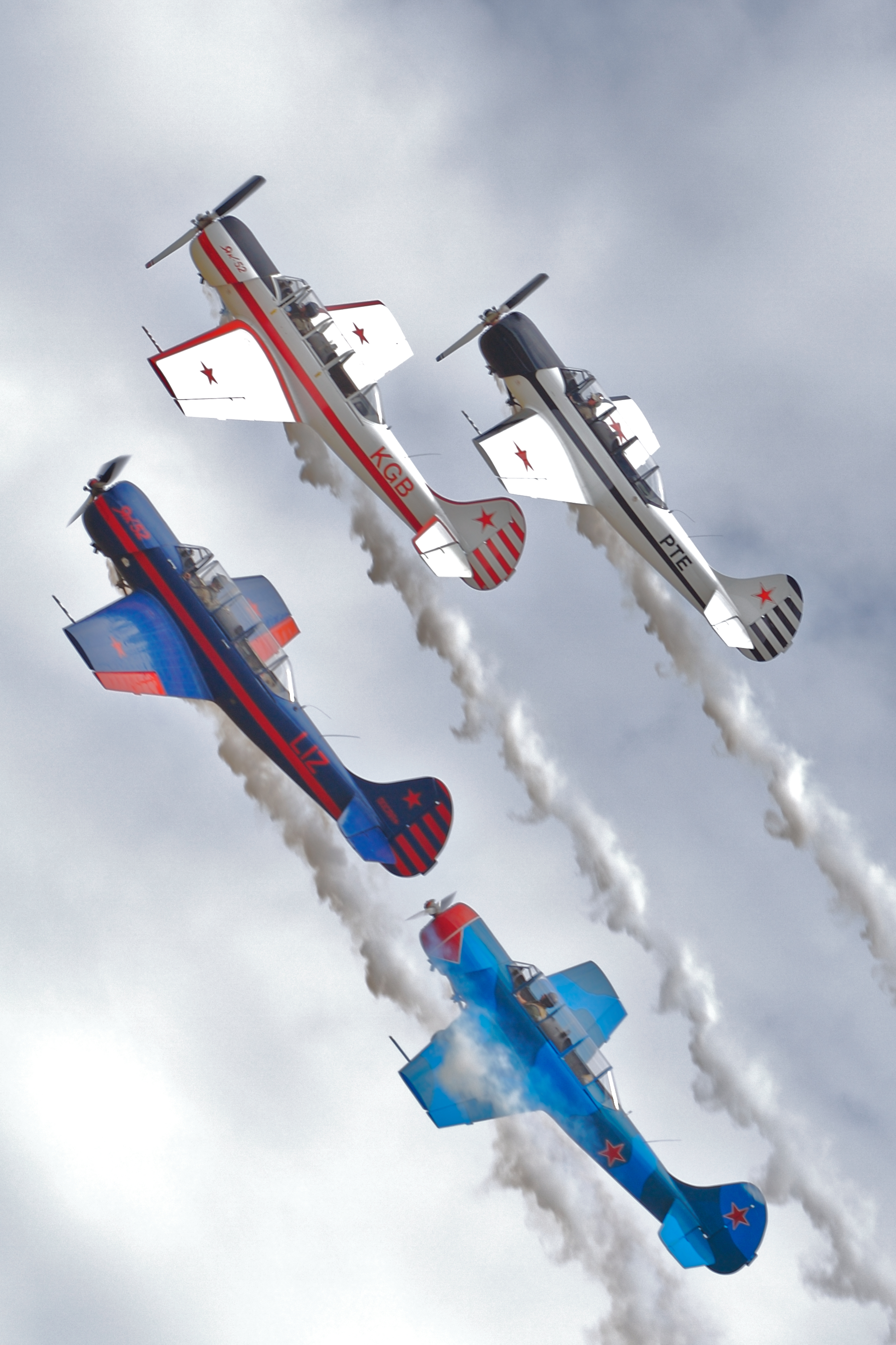
Four Yak-52s Wings over Wairarapa airshow 2007

There is a local Metlink bus service in Masterton operated by Tranzit. The buses operate on five routes: three suburban and two regional, including:

Metlink Bus Services	Termini
Route 200; Masterton/Featherston	Wairarapa Hospital; Featherston Station
Route 201; Masterton West	Masterton – Church Street; Worksop Road (Woolworths)
Route 202; Masterton South & East	Masterton – Church Street; Masterton – Church Street
Route 203; Masterton – Lansdowne Circuit	Masterton – Church Street; Worksop Road (Woolworths)
Route 205; Featherston/Martinborough	Featherston Station; Martinborough

There is also the MPN: Masterton to Palmerston North (via Woodville) service, not operated under the Metlink brand.

=== Air ===
Hood Aerodrome is 2 miles southwest of the town of Masterton. As of 2015, there are no commercial flights from Hood Aerodrome. From early 2009 until late 2013, Air New Zealand provided flights to Auckland, operated by subsidiary Eagle Airways six days a week, mainly to serve business customers in the Wairarapa. There have been a few other unsuccessful attempts at commercial air travel in Masterton, mostly failing due to its proximity to major airports in Wellington and Palmerston North. The most significant was by South Pacific Airlines of New Zealand (SPANZ), which operated daily flights using DC3s during the sixties to destinations nationwide until the airline's closure in 1966.

== Education ==
Masterton's schools were reviewed in 2003 to take into account a changing demographic of the population, with several primary schools closing and merging. Today, there are five state primary schools in the township – four state contributing primaries: Douglas Park, Fernridge, Masterton Primary and Solway; and one state full primary: Lakeview. In addition, there are five state full primary schools in the surrounding district: Mauriceville, Opaki, Tinui, Wainuiouru and Whareama, and two state-integrated primaries: St Patrick's, a Catholic contributing primary, and Hadlow, an Anglican full primary.

Masterton Intermediate School, with over 500 students, is the only intermediate school in Masterton (and the Wairarapa), bridging the gap between the state contributing primary schools and the secondary schools.

Two state secondary schools serve Masterton: Wairarapa College is the largest of the two with 1050 students, serving the western side of the town, while Makoura College with 320 students serves the eastern side of town. Four state-integrated schools also serve the town: Chanel College is a coeducational Catholic school with its own intermediate department; Rathkeale College and St Matthew's Collegiate are Anglican boys and girls schools respectively, with St Matthew's having an intermediate department; and Solway College is a Presbyterian girls school with intermediate. There is also a composite (primary/secondary combined) Māori immersion school in the town: Te Kura Kaupapa Māori o Wairarapa.

Masterton has its own polytechnic, run by UCOL (Universal College of Learning).

== Media ==
=== Newspapers ===
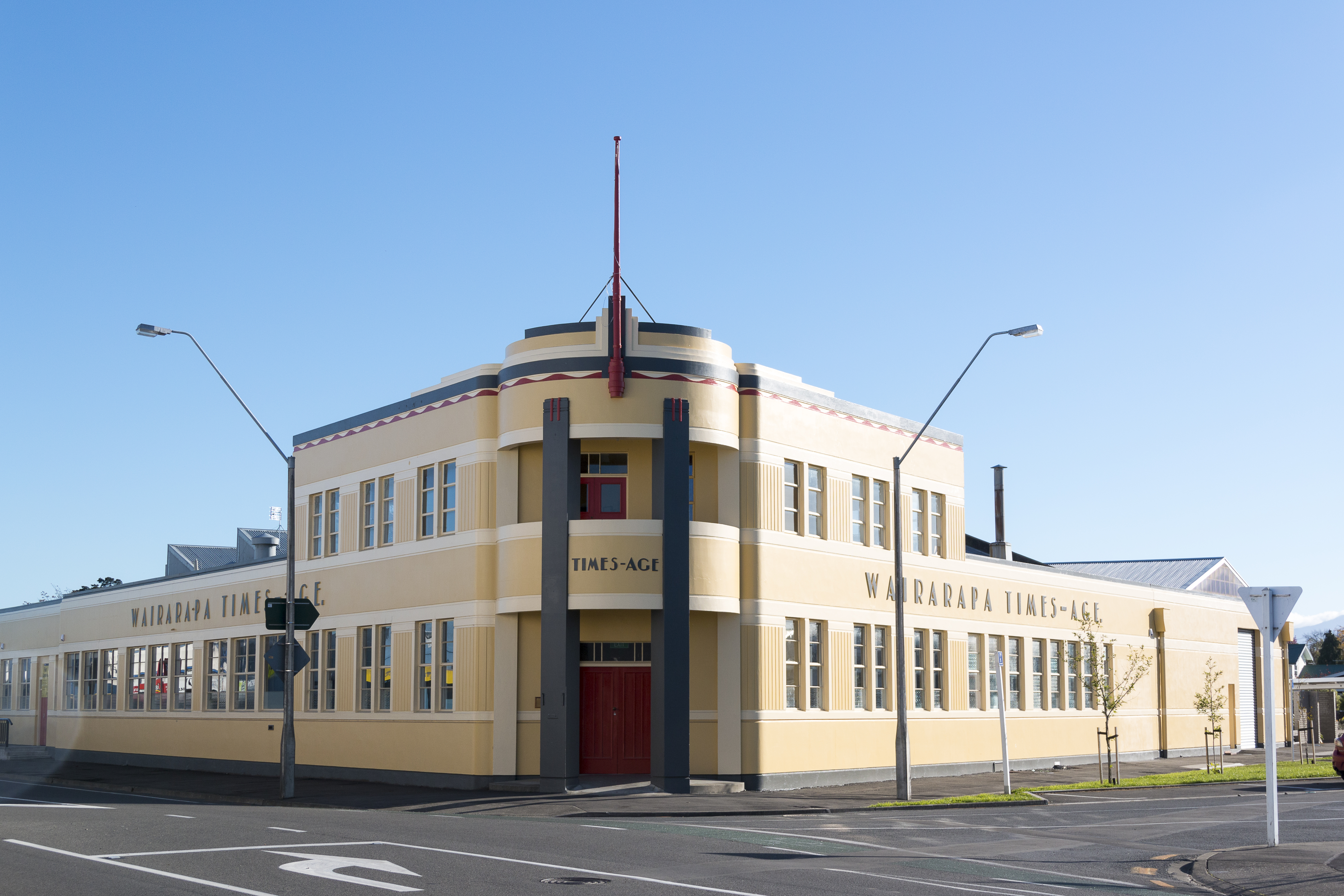
Times-Age offices and printing works

There are several newspapers circulated in Masterton, including two daily publications (Wairarapa Times-Age, The Post) and a free community title, Wairarapa Midweek. The Wairarapa Times-Age is the only daily newspaper based in Masterton. Formed by a merger between the Wairarapa Age and the Wairarapa Daily Times on 1 April 1938, The Wairarapa Times-Age has an audited paid circulation of 5,427. The Wairarapa Times-Age is owned by Stuff Group which bought the Wairarapa Times-Age from National Media Limited in May 2024.

The Wairarapa Midweek, a weekly community paper with an audited circulation of 21,186, is distributed every Wednesday along with the TA Property. The Wairarapa Times-Age building at 70 Chapel Street no longer holds the presses, and the space was used by the nascent Masterton Fab lab which has now relocated to UCOL.

Fairfax NZ owned The Post is widely circulated in the Masterton district. The Wellington-based metropolitan daily newspaper has an office, Media House, at 123 Chapel Street in Masterton. The Dominion-Post has an audited paid circulation of 55,496.

=== Radio ===
Masterton is serviced by one local radio station. Wairarapa's MORE FM 89.5 or 105.9 for the coastal frequency. MORE FM broadcasts locally from 6am to 10am daily from studios in Kuripuni. The station was founded by controversial Broadcaster Paul Henry, as TODAY FM 89.3 in Carterton, in 1991. Later the station was rebranded as Hitz 89FM, Wairarapa's Best Music.

=== Television ===
Television broadcasting began in Masterton in May 1963 with the commissioning of the Otahoua transmitter east of the town, relaying Wellington's WNTV1 channel (now part of TVNZ 1). The town was one of the first outside the main centres to receive television, as the transmitter also formed part of the relay link carrying Wellington's television service to the Wharite Peak transmitter near Palmerston North, commissioned later that year.

Freeview HD digital terrestrial television was introduced in July 2011, ahead of the region's digital switchover in September 2013. The service is transmitted from the Popoiti site south of the town.

== Notable people ==
- Sylvia Ashton-Warner, writer
- Mary Gertrude Banahan, Catholic sister
- Barry Barclay, writer and filmmaker
- Harold Barrowclough, Chief Justice of New Zealand
- Rocco Berry, rugby league player
- Amanda Billing, actor
- Roger Blackley, art historian
- Constance Bolton, artist
- Michael Bracewell, international cricketer
- Matahi Brightwell, master carver and founder of waka ama sport in New Zealand
- Russell Calvert, politician
- Ted Chamberlain, plant pathologist
- Jemaine Clement, actor, comedian and musician
- Wyatt Creech, politician
- Helen Cowie, Doctor
- Ian Cross, novelist
- Barry Dallas, medical practitioner and politician
- George Davis-Goff, naval officer
- Haddon Donald, soldier, businessman and politician
- Pat Evison, actor
- John Falloon, politician
- Bill Francis, broadcaster
- George Groombridge, politician
- Christopher Hodson, judge
- Alexander Hogg, newspaper editor and politician
- Thomas W. Horton, RAF officer
- Raybon Kan, writer and stand-up comedian
- Ladyhawke, singer-songwriter
- Jack Lewin, prominent public servant
- Sir Brian Lochore, All Black
- Alan MacDiarmid, Nobel Prize winning chemist
- Ron Mark, soldier and politician
- Harold Miller, librarian
- David Nicholson, Australian politician
- Susan Parkinson, nutritionist
- Edwin Perry, politician
- George Petersen, historian
- Arthur Prior, logician and philosopher
- Ian Prior, doctor and epidemiologist
- Frances Rutherford, artist
- Jesse Ryder, cricketer
- Brad Shields, rugby player
- Aaron Slight, World Superbike motorcycle racer
- Campbell Smith, playwright
- Harold Smith, politician
- J. Valentine Smith, landowner
- Olive Rose Sutherland, teacher
- Ivan Sutherland, ethnologist
- Selina Sutherland, nurse, founder of Masterton Hospital
- Bill Tolhurst, politician
- Elwyn Welch, farmer, ornithologist, conservationist and missionary

== Sister cities ==
Masterton has sister-city relationships with:

- Hatsukaichi, Hiroshima, Japan
- Changchun, China
- Armidale, New South Wales, Australia

== See also ==
- Masterton railway station
- Renall Street railway station
- Solway railway station
