= Wairarapa =

Region of New Zealand

- Unofficial region of New Zealand
- The Wairarapa within New Zealand
- Country: New Zealand
- Island: North Island

Area
  - Total: 8,423 km^{2} (3,252 sq mi)

The Wairarapa (/ˌwaɪrəˈræpə/; Māori pronunciation: [ˈwaiɾaɾapa]) is an unofficial region of New Zealand located in the south-eastern corner of the North Island, east of the cities of Wellington, Lower Hutt, Upper Hutt, and Palmerston North. The Wairarapa's northern boundary approximately matches the southern border of the former Hawke's Bay Province. Its eastern boundary is the coast from a location near Cape Turnagain, southward to Cape Palliser. The southern boundary is Palliser Bay, which sweeps from Cape Palliser to Turakirae Head. To the west, the region is bordered by the peaks of the Remutaka and Tararua Ranges. (Note: The northern boundary is not clearly defined. A map in Te Ara shows the Wairarapa's northern boundary, which matches the southern boundary of Hawke's Bay Province. The provincial boundary was defined as a line between the Manawatū Gorge and the mouth of the Waimata River (previously called the Waimata Stream). However, in the text, Te Ara says the coastal boundary point is Cape Turnagain, 11.5 km ENE of the Waimata River Mouth, and that according to Ngāti Kahungunu, the Wairarapa stretched from Pōrangahau to Turakirae. Waitangi Tribunal (2010) says that the Wairarapa's northern boundary is not clear. A map in Waitangi Tribunal (2010) shows the Wairarapa's northern boundary according to "popular usage", from just north of Woodville to the Akitio River Mouth on the coast, 20 km SW of Cape Turnagain. Depending on the choice of source, and how it is interpreted, the Wairarapa might (or might not) include Herbertville, Pōrangahau, Woodville, and many smaller settlements.)

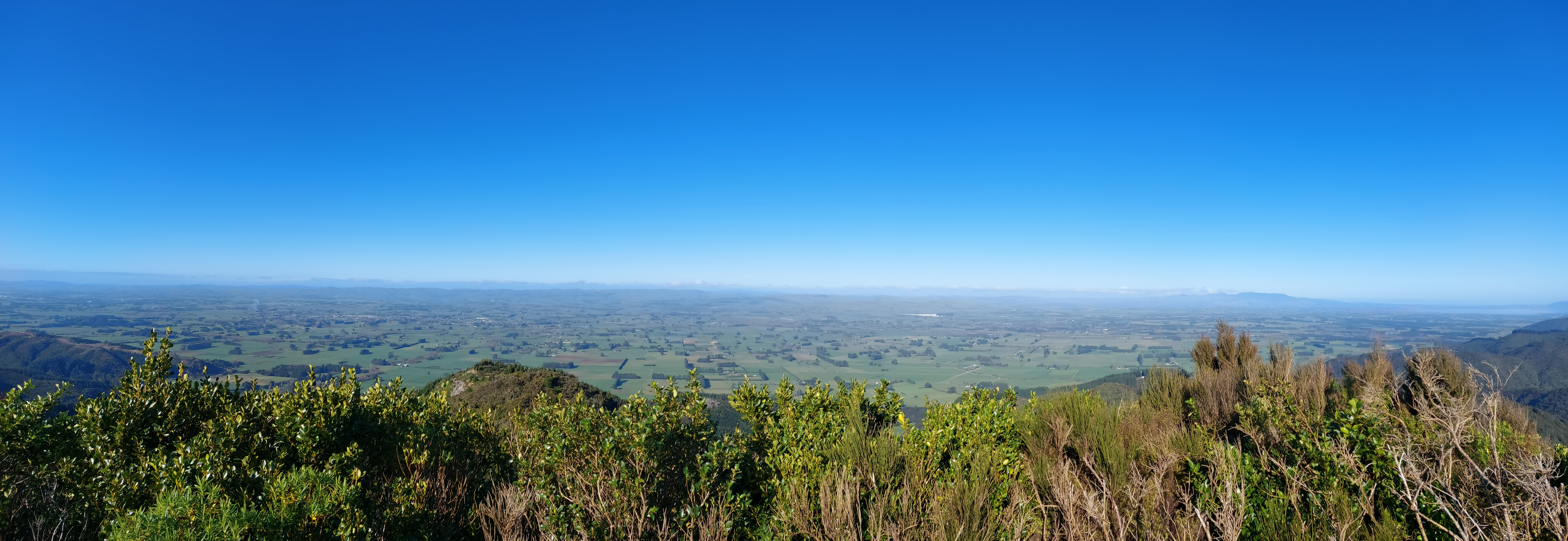
The view of the Wairarapa from Mt Dick, Carterton

The Wairarapa is one of New Zealand's more thinly populated areas. Its largest town, Masterton has an urban population (June 2025) of about 22,600 people. The region is named after its largest lake, Lake Wairarapa.

== Etymology ==
The name Wairarapa means "glistening waters" in the Māori language. According to some oral histories, the legendary Polynesian explorer Kupe named the wetlands after touching down in the area several times. According to other oral histories, explorer Haunui named the wetlands after the way the lake appeared to glisten from the Remutaka Ranges to the west.

In English, the name Wairarapa is sometimes used with a definite article: "the Wairarapa". (Note: Text search in the pdf versions of Bagnall (1976) and Waitangi Tribunal (2010) finds multiple examples of "the Wairarapa". Bagnall often omits "the".)

During British colonial times the region was sometimes called Wyderop, Wydrop, or Waidrop.

== History ==
Rangitāne and Ngāti Kahungunu were the resident Māori tribes (iwi) when European explorers arrived in the area in the 1770s.

In 1841 Robert Stokes and several companions travelled over the Remutaka Range, returning to Wellington via the coastal route around Turakirae Head. Stokes noted the agricultural potential of the Wairarapa plains and spread word of such in Wellington.

On 23 January 1855 the region was shaken by the strongest earthquake recorded in New Zealand, with an estimated magnitude of 8.2. In the Wairarapa, several people (variously reported as two, four, five or six) were killed when a building collapsed during the shaking.

In World War II United States Marine Corps soldiers were stationed in the Wairarapa with two battalions in Masterton.

== Geography ==
The Wairarapa region has several geographic zones. The Remutaka, Tararua, and Ruahine Ranges form the region's western boundary.

The Remutaka Range extends from Turakirae Head to the Remutaka Pass, reaching its highest point at Mount Matthews, a 940 m (3,080 ft) peak near the southern end of the range.

The Tararua Range extends from the Remutaka Pass to the Manawatū Gorge. There are 15 peaks of 1,500 m (4,900 ft) or higher along the Tararuas. The tallest is the 1,570 m (5,150 ft) Pukeamoamo / Mitre (not to be confused with Mitre Peak).

Most of the population is concentrated in three central zones (from south to north): the Wairarapa Basin, the Masterton Basin, and the Pahiatua Basin.

The eastern hill country extends eastward from the central basins to the coast. The Aorangi Range runs north for about 20 kilometres from Cape Palliser (the region's southernmost point). The Aorangis have several peaks higher than 600 metres, including the 979 m (3,212 ft) Te Maunga and the 983 m (3,225 ft) metre Hikapu / Mount Ross.

North of the Aorangis the eastern hill country is broken and undulating, with peaks seldom exceeding 500 m (1,600 ft). Between the Masterton and Pahiatua Basins, the eastern hill country extends inland to the flanks of the Tararua Range, dividing the region into northern and southern areas. East of the Pahiatua Basin, the Waewaepa and Puketoi Ranges rise significantly higher than the surrounding area, with the Puketoi reaching 800 m (2,600 ft).

=== Rivers ===
The Ruamāhanga River flows through the Masterton and Wairarapa Basins, fed by numerous tributaries along the way, before draining into Lake Ōnoke which discharges into Palliser Bay.

The Tauwharenīkau River rises in the Tararua Range and flows through the western Wairarapa Basin to Lake Wairarapa, which drains into the lower Ruamāhanga River.

West of Pahiatua, the Mangahao River flows northeast through the Pahiatua Basin from its source in the Tararau Range to the Manawatū River, which flows westward through the Manawatū Gorge to the west coast. Also flowing northeast through the Pahiatua Basin, the Mākākahi and Mangatainoka join the lower Tiraumea River before flowing into the Manawatū River.

The eastern hill country is drained by numerous rivers and streams flowing into rivers traversing the central basins, or to the Manawatū River, or eastward to the coast.

=== Towns, Settlements, and Localities ===
Larger settlements in the Wairarapa include Carterton, Eketāhuna, Featherston, Martinborough, Masterton, Pahiatua and Woodville.

Other Wairarapa settlements include Akitio, Alfredton, Ballance, Bideford, Castlepoint, Dalefield, Gladstone, Kahutara, Kokotau, Lake Ferry, Makuri, Mangatainoka, Mauriceville, Mount Holdsworth, Ngawi, Ōpaki, Pirinoa, Pongaroa, Riversdale Beach, South Featherston, Tauweru, Tīnui, Wainuioru, and Whareama.

== Parks and reserves ==
The Wairarapa region includes a wide range of protected areas, including several conservation parks that provide opportunities for outdoor and backcountry recreation and hunting. The Tararua and Remutaka Ranges are major geographic features in the west of the Wairarapa region, and occupy around 14% of the land area. Most of the area of these two ranges is protected within the Tararua and Remutaka Forest Parks. The Tararua Forest Park was gazetted in 1954 as New Zealand's first forest park, and with an area of 1,150 km^{2} (440 sq mi) is the largest forest park in the North Island. Between 120,000 and 150,000 people visit Tararua Forest Park each year, with the majority of those coming from Wellington. Aorangi Forest Park is a 194 km^{2} (75 sq mi) area at the southern end of the Wairarapa region, extending north from Cape Palliser.

Fensham Reserve is a small area of remnant native forest located north of Carterton, owned by Forest & Bird.

Pūkaha National Wildlife Centre is a captive breeding facility and visitor centre located in a protected forest area of 891 ha (2,200 acres), adjacent to State Highway 2 around 30 km (19 mi) north of Masterton. Pūkaha has been described by the Mayor of Masterton as "one of the region’s most important conservation and tourism attractions”.

Wairarapa Moana Wetlands is the largest wetland in the lower North Island, one of the largest in New Zealand, and was recognised as a wetland of international significance under the Ramsar Convention in August 2020. It covers an area of 9,000 ha (22,000 acres), with the largest part being Lake Wairarapa at 7,800 ha (19,000 acres).

One of the notable urban parks in the region is Queen Elizabeth Park in Masterton.

The Wairarapa Dark Sky Reserve is an area of 3,665 square kilometres (1,415 sq mi), certified by the International Dark-Sky Association in January 2023. It was the second dark sky reserve to be certified in New Zealand (after the Aoraki Mackenzie International Dark Sky Reserve in 2012). The area covered by the reserve includes the Aorangi Forest Park, and the entire South Wairarapa and Carterton Districts.

== Politics ==
The Wairarapa is represented in the New Zealand Parliament by two overlapping electorates. Voters on the General Roll vote in the Wairarapa Electorate, which also includes southern Hawke's Bay. Voters on the Māori Roll vote in the Ikaroa-Rāwhiti Electorate, which also includes Hawke's Bay and the East Coast.

The Wairarapa includes the local government districts of South Wairarapa, Carterton, Masterton, and part of Tararua District.

The southern and central parts of the Wairarapa (including South Wairarapa, Carterton, and Masterton Districts, together with a small triangle in the south-east of Tararua district) are in Wellington Region. The remainder is in the Manawatū-Whanganui Region.

== Economy ==
The agricultural industries, including forestry, cropping, sheep, beef and dairy farming, are major land users. The area around Martinborough, in the south, is notable for its vineyards and wine, as are the outskirts of Masterton and Carterton. Beer has been brewed at Mangatainoka, near Pahiatua, since 1889. There are over 60 wineries in the region since the weather is very similar to Burgundy. Deer farming is growing in importance.

=== Transport ===
==== Roads ====
Westbound highway connections are constrained by the Remutaka and Tararua Ranges. To the southwest, State Highway 2 (SH 2 ) connects the region with the Hutt Valley and Wellington via the Remutaka Pass.

Road connections to the Manawatū are provided by SH 2 (via State Highway 3 and by a local road called the Pahiatua Track, from Pahiatua over the Tararuas to Palmerston North. SH 2 also provides road connection with the Hawke's Bay.

SH 2 is the region's main highway between Featherston and Pahiatua. State Highway 53 runs from SH 2 at Featherston to the town of Martinborough.

Route 52 runs from SH 2 at Masterton, via the eastern uplands and Pongaroa to SH 2 at Waipukurau (Hawke's Bay).

A network of local roads connect the Wairarapa's many rural localities. Some of these local roads are not sealed.

==== Railway ====
The Wairarapa railway line connects the region via the Remutaka Tunnel to Wellington. A commuter rail passenger service, the Wairarapa Connection from Masterton to Wellington is operated by Metlink Wellington for Metlink. Before 2016, it was operated by Tranz Metro.

==== Commuting ====
Many residents, especially in the southern towns such as Featherston and Greytown, commute to work in Wellington, either by train or over the Remutaka Range by car or motorcycle.

== Notable people ==
- Max Abbott, psychologist, Pro-Vice Chancellor of Auckland University of Technology, and former president of the World Federation for Mental Health, born Featherston
- Pip Brown – singer/songwriter Ladyhawke, born Masterton
- James Cameron, film director
- Bob Charles, champion golfer and winner of the 1963 British Open, at Carterton.
- Jemaine Clement, one half of the comedy band/TV series "Flight of the Conchords"
- Marcus Daniell Masterton-born professional tennis player
- Geoffrey Fisken, highest scoring NZ fighter ace at Pacific in the WW2
- Katie Gold, potter
- Murray Halberg, middle-distance runner and Olympic gold medalist, at Eketāhuna
- Keith Holyoake, former Prime Minister of New Zealand, at Pahiatua.
- Raybon Kan, Comedian, at Masterton
- Moana Leota, singer-songwriter
- Brian Lochore, All Black captain and World Cup-winning coach, at Masterton
- Alan Graham MacDiarmid, Nobel Prize-winning chemist, born in Masterton
- Cathy Penney, helicopter pilot and founder (with Laurie Bargh) of Heli-Flight Wairarapa
- Arthur Prior, Masterton-born logician and philosopher. Professor of Philosophy at the University of Manchester, fellow and tutor at Balliol College, Oxford, and founder of Temporal logic.
- Jesse Ryder, International cricketer, at Masterton
- Ross Taylor, International cricketer
- Te Hiko Pīata Tama-i-hikoia, 19th-century Māori tribal leader
- Vincent Ward, Film director, at Greytown (What Dreams May Come, The Navigator, Vigil, River Queen)
- Maurice Wilkins, Nobel Prize-winning scientist, whose work led to the discovery of the structure of DNA, at Pongaroa.

== See also ==
- Georgina Beyer, Ex MP for Wairarapa, ex Mayor of Carterton.
- Grant Batty, Greytown, Ex *All Black*
- Geoffrey Fisken, Grazier, Fighter Pilot
- Zac Guildford, Masterton, All Black
- List of regions in New Zealand
- List of rivers of Wellington Region
- List of rivers of the Manawatū-Whanganui_Region
- Seventy Mile Bush
- New Zealand wine

== Bibliography ==
- Bagnall, Austin Graham (1976). Wairarapa: An Historical Excursion. Masterton, NZ: Hedley’s Bookshop Ltd., for The Masterton Trust Lands Trust.
- Boffa Miskell (August 2010). "Wairarapa Landscape Study 2010 - Landscape Character Description Report" (PDF). Greater Wellington Regional Council.
- Grapes, Rodney (2000). Magnitude Eight Plus. Wellington, NZ: Victoria University Press.
- Leach, B. Foss; Leach, Helen M, eds. (2020). Prehistoric Man in Palliser Bay. Wellington, NZ: Museum of New Zealand Te Papa Tongarewa.
- Waitangi Tribunal (2010). The Wairarapa ki Tararua Report. Wellington, NZ: Waitangi Tribunal.
