= Carterton, New Zealand =

Town and District in Wellington Region, New Zealand

Carterton Taratahi (Māori)
- Minor urban area
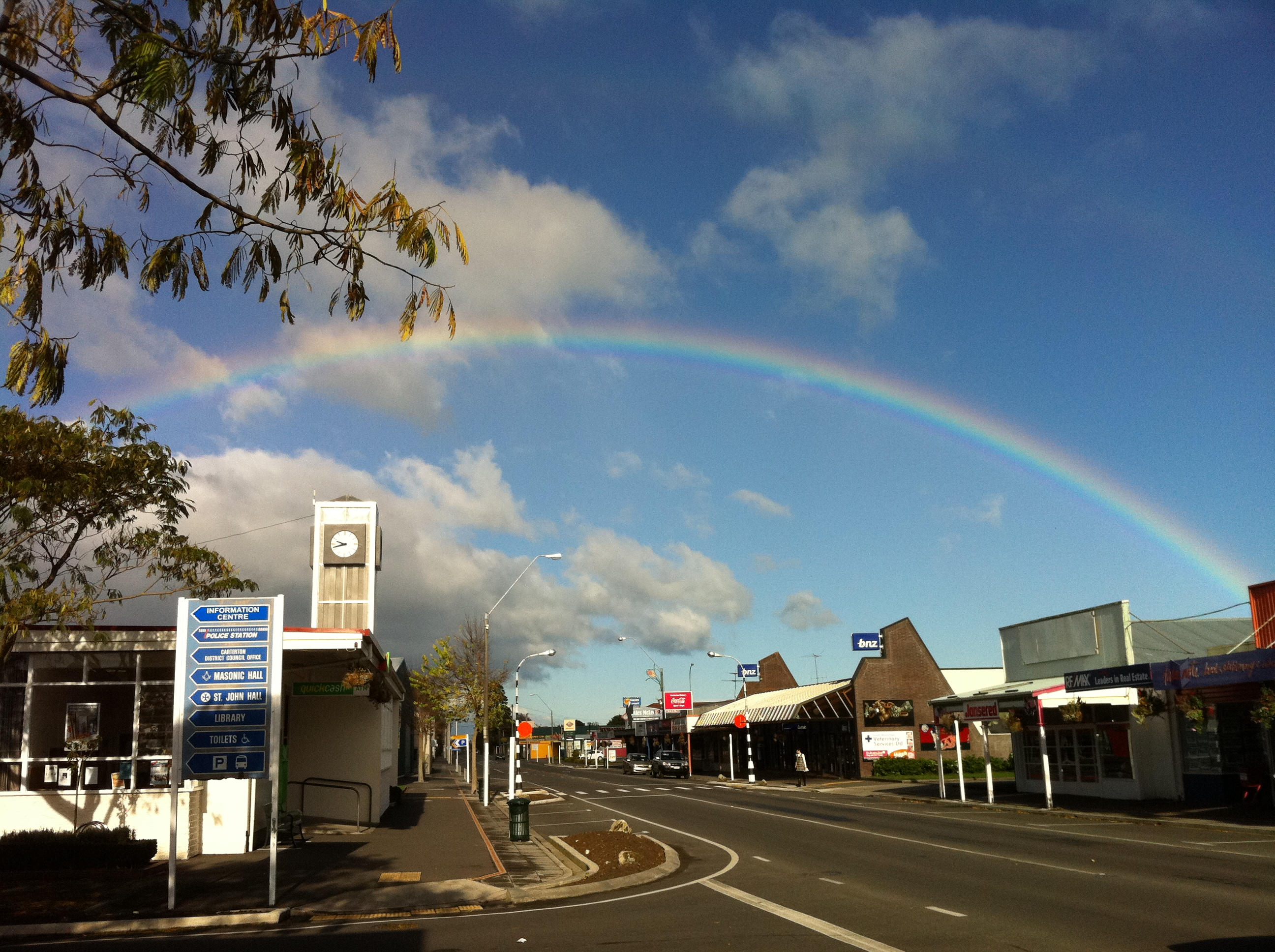
- Central Carterton

- Seal
- Motto: Daffodil capital
- Carterton district within the North Island
- Coordinates: 41°01′30″S 175°31′39″E
- Country: New Zealand
- Region: Wellington Region
- Territorial authority: Carterton District
- Town founded: 1857
- Named for: Charles Carter
- Electorates: Wairarapa; Ikaroa-Rāwhiti (Māori)

Government
  - Territorial Authority: Carterton District Council
  - Regional council: Greater Wellington Regional Council
  - Mayor of Carterton: Steve Cretney
  - Wairarapa MP: TBD
  - Ikaroa-Rāwhiti MP: Cushla Tangaere-Manuel

Area
  - Territorial: 1,179.91 km^{2} (455.57 sq mi)
  - Urban: 5.30 km^{2} (2.05 sq mi)
- Elevation: 77 m (253 ft)

Population (June 2025)
  - Territorial: 10,300
  - Density: 8.73/km^{2} (22.6/sq mi)
  - Urban: 5,930
  - Urban density: 1,120/km^{2} (2,900/sq mi)
- Time zone: UTC+12 (NZST)
  - Summer (DST): UTC+13 (NZDT)
- Postcode(s): 5713
- Area code: 06
- Website: www.cdc.govt.nz District Council

Carterton (Māori: Taratahi) is a small town in the Wellington Region of New Zealand and the seat of the Carterton District (a territorial authority or local government district). It lies in a farming area of the Wairarapa in New Zealand's North Island. It is located 14 km (8.7 mi) southwest of Masterton and 80 km (50 mi) northeast of Wellington. The town has a population of 5,930 (June 2025), out of a total district population of 10,300.

Carterton was founded in 1857. Originally known as Three Mile Bush, it served as housing for workers building the road between Wellington and Masterton. It was later renamed after Charles Carter, who was in charge of the building of the Black Bridge over the Waiohine River south of the town. The town describes itself as New Zealand's daffodil capital, holding a Daffodil Festival each year on the second Sunday in September, with the main event taking place at Middle Run along Gladstone Road.

== History ==
Carterton was the first place in the world to elect a transgender mayor, Georgina Beyer. Beyer went on to set another world's first record, becoming the MP for the Wairarapa electorate in 1999.

On 7 January 2012, a hot air balloon crashed just north of the town, killing eleven people and making headlines around the world. The balloon came into contact with a high-voltage power line supplying the town, resulting in the balloon catching fire and the town losing power briefly. In 1956, along with Masterton, Carterton became the joint first town in New Zealand to use the 111 Emergency Number.

== Demographics ==
=== Carterton ===
Carterton covers 5.30 km^{2} (2.05 sq mi) and had an estimated population of 5,930 as of June 2025, with a population density of 1,119 people per km^{2}.

Historical population
Year	Pop.	±% p.a.
2006	4,137	—
2013	4,740	+1.96%
2018	5,343	+2.42%
2023	5,859	+1.86%

Carterton had a population of 5,859 in the 2023 New Zealand census, an increase of 516 people (9.7%) since the 2018 census, and an increase of 1,119 people (23.6%) since the 2013 census. There were 2,787 males, 3,036 females, and 33 people of other genders in 2,505 dwellings. 3.4% of people identified as LGBTIQ+. The median age was 50.5 years (compared with 38.1 years nationally). There were 951 people (16.2%) aged under 15 years, 744 (12.7%) aged 15 to 29, 2,448 (41.8%) aged 30 to 64, and 1,713 (29.2%) aged 65 or older.

People could identify as more than one ethnicity. The results were 89.6% European (Pākehā); 16.0% Māori; 2.9% Pasifika; 3.8% Asian; 0.5% Middle Eastern, Latin American and African New Zealanders (MELAA); and 2.8% other, which includes people giving their ethnicity as "New Zealander". English was spoken by 97.7%, Māori by 2.7%, Samoan by 0.3%, and other languages by 6.8%. No language could be spoken by 1.8% (e.g. too young to talk). New Zealand Sign Language was known by 0.3%. The percentage of people born overseas was 17.6, compared with 28.8% nationally.

Religious affiliations were 30.6% Christian, 0.7% Hindu, 0.4% Islam, 1.0% Māori religious beliefs, 0.5% Buddhist, 0.4% New Age, 0.2% Jewish, and 1.4% other religions. People who answered that they had no religion were 57.9%, and 7.3% of people did not answer the census question.

Of those at least 15 years old, 960 (19.6%) people had a bachelor's or higher degree, 2,637 (53.7%) had a post-high school certificate or diploma, and 1,308 (26.7%) people exclusively held high school qualifications. The median income was $33,700, compared with $41,500 nationally. 432 people (8.8%) earned over $100,000 compared to 12.1% nationally. The employment status of those at least 15 was 2,103 (42.8%) full-time, 669 (13.6%) part-time, and 90 (1.8%) unemployed.

=== Carterton District ===
Carterton District covers 1,179.91 km^{2} (455.57 sq mi) and had an estimated population of 10,300 as of June 2025, with a population density of 8.7 people per km^{2}.

Historical population for Carterton District
Year	Pop.	±% p.a.
2006	7,101	—
2013	8,235	+2.14%
2018	9,198	+2.24%
2023	10,107	+1.90%

Carterton District had a population of 10,107 in the 2023 New Zealand census, an increase of 909 people (9.9%) since the 2018 census, and an increase of 1,872 people (22.7%) since the 2013 census. There were 4,947 males, 5,118 females, and 45 people of other genders in 4,116 dwellings. 3.1% of people identified as LGBTIQ+. The median age was 48.4 years (compared with 38.1 years nationally). There were 1,788 people (17.7%) aged under 15 years, 1,290 (12.8%) aged 15 to 29, 4,548 (45.0%) aged 30 to 64, and 2,484 (24.6%) aged 65 or older.

People could identify as more than one ethnicity. The results were 91.2% European (Pākehā); 14.1% Māori; 2.3% Pasifika; 3.1% Asian; 0.4% Middle Eastern, Latin American and African New Zealanders (MELAA); and 3.3% other, which includes people giving their ethnicity as "New Zealander". English was spoken by 97.9%, Māori by 2.4%, Samoan by 0.3%, and other languages by 7.1%. No language could be spoken by 1.8% (e.g. too young to talk). New Zealand Sign Language was known by 0.4%. The percentage of people born overseas was 17.3, compared with 28.8% nationally.

Religious affiliations were 30.5% Christian, 0.4% Hindu, 0.3% Islam, 0.7% Māori religious beliefs, 0.4% Buddhist, 0.4% New Age, 0.1% Jewish, and 1.2% other religions. People who answered that they had no religion were 58.4%, and 7.7% of people did not answer the census question.

Of those at least 15 years old, 1,827 (22.0%) people had a bachelor's or higher degree, 4,566 (54.9%) had a post-high school certificate or diploma, and 1,929 (23.2%) people exclusively held high school qualifications. The median income was $37,800, compared with $41,500 nationally. 930 people (11.2%) earned over $100,000 compared to 12.1% nationally. The employment status of those at least 15 was 3,942 (47.4%) full-time, 1,305 (15.7%) part-time, and 156 (1.9%) unemployed.

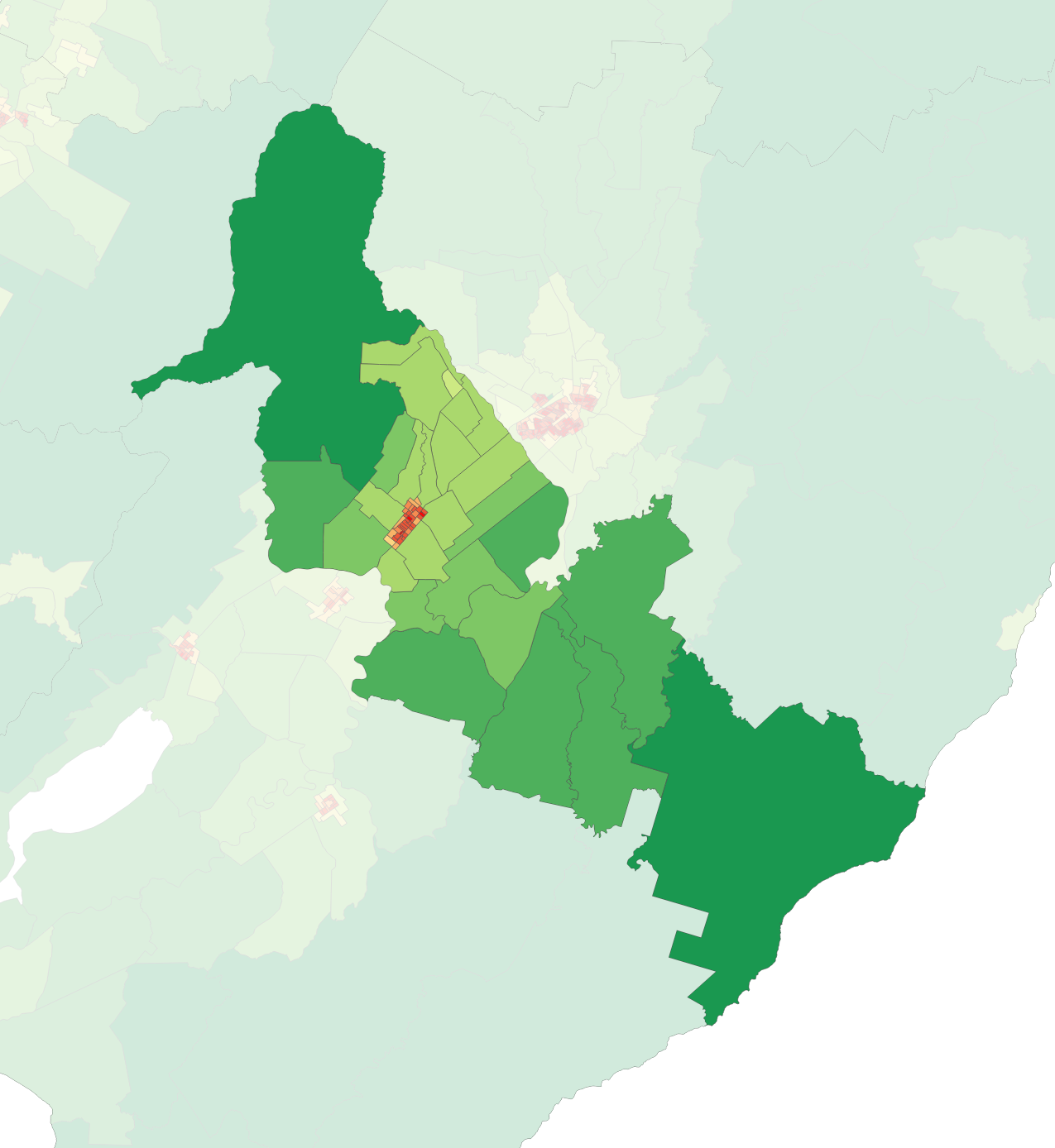
Population density in the 2023 census

Individual statistical areas in Carterton District
Name	Area (km^{2})	Population	Density (per km^{2})	Dwellings	Median age	Median income
Mount Holdsworth	432.87	2,037	4.7	765	47.5 years	$42,300
Carterton North (Note: Part of Carterton town)	2.36	2,688	1,139.0	1,194	52.4 years	$32,800
Kokotau	120.58	1,275	10.6	486	46.2 years	$44,300
Carterton South	2.94	3,168	1,077.6	1,308	48.2 years	$34,400
Gladstone	621.16	939	1.5	360	44.4 years	$48,300
New Zealand					38.1 years	$41,500

== Landmarks ==
Carterton's town clock is located on High Street next to the post office. The existing tower was put into operation in September 1962, replacing the original clock tower atop the post office that was damaged in the 24 June 1942 Wairarapa earthquake.

The Bank of New South Wales, showing confidence in Carterton, built a beautifully ornate bank building on the corner of Park Road and High Street North in 1912. This building is listed in the historic buildings list found in the Wairarapa Combined District Plan. In 1982, the Bank of New South Wales became Westpac and continued to occupy the building until a devastating earthquake in Christchurch (6.3 on the Richter scale) severely damaged many unreinforced masonry buildings in February 2011. After an unfavourable engineers' assessment the bank shifted out of the building approximately 150 metres south in High Street North. The building underwent substantial seismic strengthening and re-opened as the Carterton Free Presbyterian Church in July 2017.

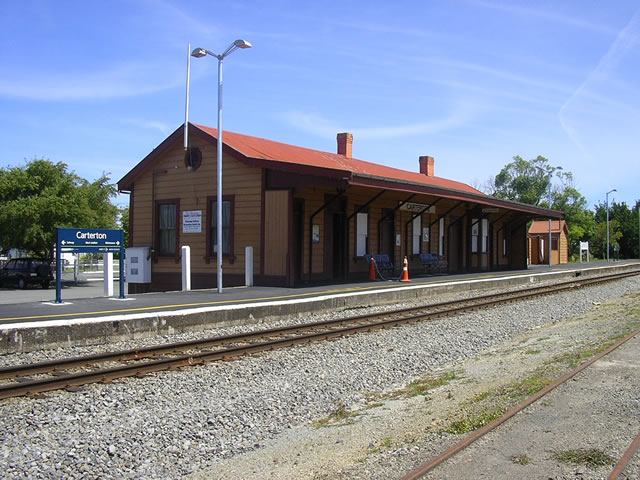
Historic Carterton Railway Station

Historic Carterton railway station is located west of the town centre off Belvedere Road. The station building at the station is original, having been built when the railway opened in 1880, and has accepted passenger services ever since. It is currently leased from KiwiRail Network by the Wairarapa Railway Restoration Society.

The Carterton District library was established in 1874 and is one of New Zealand's oldest public libraries. The library building, built in 1881, on Holloway Street is the oldest purpose built library in the country.

The Carterton Events Centre is also on Holloway Street. Opened in October 2011, this state-of-the-art, multi-purpose community facility is available for community and commercial use. Centrally located in the Wairarapa region, the Centre provides modern, flexible, spaces for all manner of events, shows, exhibitions, meetings and community gatherings. Interconnection of spaces throughout the Centre allows for separation and opening up of spaces to cater for different needs. The Events Centre belongs to the Carterton community, through the Carterton District Council.

Carrington Park in High St was established in the late 19th century and contains several recreational facilities such as children's play areas, a skate park and BBQ area. The band rotunda is a Heritage New Zealand Category 2 historic place and an example of Edwardian architecture. It dates to 1911–1912 and was built to mark King George V's coronation.

Carterton's Memorial Square is on the corner of High Street and Park Road and holds Carterton's World War One memorial, positioned centrally. The red granite pillar, apparently broken off at the top, symbolising the lives cut short by the war. The memorial was unveiled on 13 February 1921 by Minister of Internal Affairs George Anderson. Since the 1930s, Memorial Square has been administered under an act of parliament – the Carterton and District Memorial Square Act (1932).

On Sundays, from 22 February 2015, the Square began to host Carterton Farmers' Market. This weekly produce and craft event was born of the 2014 Place Making Carterton project, initiated by the Carterton District Business (Inc) group and Carterton District Council.

Located 10 minutes from the Square is Stonehenge Aotearoa, built by members of The Phoenix Astronomy Society, it is a modern adaptation (opened in 2005) of the Stonehenge ruins on the Salisbury Plain of England.

== Economy ==
The Carterton District has a modelled gross domestic product (GDP) of $444 million in the year to March 2024, 0.1% of New Zealand's national GDP. The GDP per capita is $42,406, ranking 58th out of 66 territorial authorities.

== Education ==
Carterton has three primary schools:

- Carterton School, a state full primary (Year 1–8) school with a roll of 178 students as of July 2026. The school opened in 1861. From 1906, the school was Carterton District High School but it returned to being a primary school when Kuranui College opened in 1960.
- South End School, a state full primary (Year 1–8) school with a roll of 191 students as of July 2026. The school opened in 1962.
- St Mary's School, a state-integrated Catholic full primary (Year 1–8) school with a roll of 134 students as of July 2026. The school opened in 1917 and integrated into the state education system in the early 1980s.

Ponatahi Christian School, a state-integrated composite (Year 1–13) Christian school, is also located in Carterton. It has a roll of 136 students as of July 2026. It was founded as a private school in 1978 and was originally sited at Ponatahi, southwest of Carterton. The school moved to its current site over the 1996–97 summer holidays, and integrated into the state education system in 1997.

There are no state secondary schools in Carterton. The nearest secondary schools are Kuranui College, 10 km away in Greytown, and Wairarapa College and Makoura College 14 km and 15 km away respectively in Masterton.

== Transport ==
=== Roads ===
The main street through Carterton is High Street – split on either side of Holloway Street into High Street North and High Street South. Other main streets include Park Road, Belvedere Road, Brooklyn Road, Pembroke Street and Holloway Street (which all run approximately east–west) and Lincoln Road (which runs approximately north–south). Other notable streets include Costley Street, Kenwyn Drive and Frederick Street.

Carterton District is a rapidly expanding area which, according to inter-census dates (i.e. between 2006 and 2013) is the fastest growing local government area in the North Island with respect to population. A number of new subdivisions have assisted in this expansion such as Hartley Avenue, Routhan Way, Daffodil Grove, Armstrong Avenue, Tararua Crescent, Carrington Drive and Mill Grove.

Carterton is served by State Highway 2, the main highway between Wellington and Masterton. The highway runs the length of High Street.

Carterton is served by Metlink bus route 200, which connects Carterton with Masterton, Greytown, Featherston and Martinborough.

=== Rail ===
Carterton lies on the Wairarapa Line, and is served by the Wairarapa Connection operated by KiwiRail and Transdev on behalf of Metlink, connecting Carterton to Wellington. The train serves both Carterton railway station and Matarawa railway station southwest of the township.

== Notable people ==
- Georgina Beyer, world's first transgender mayor
- Sir Bob Charles, golfer, first left-handed golfer to win a golf major (The Open Championship, 1963)
- Herbert Ernest Hart, World War I commander, born Taratahi
- Madeleine Marie Slavick, writer and photographer
- Ron Mark, politician and former mayor of Carterton
- Celia Manson, writer and journalist
- Marion Tylee, artist
- Hamuera Tamahau Mahupuku (c.1842 – 14 January 1904), a New Zealand tribal leader, runholder, assessor and newspaper proprietor from Longbush

== Image gallery ==
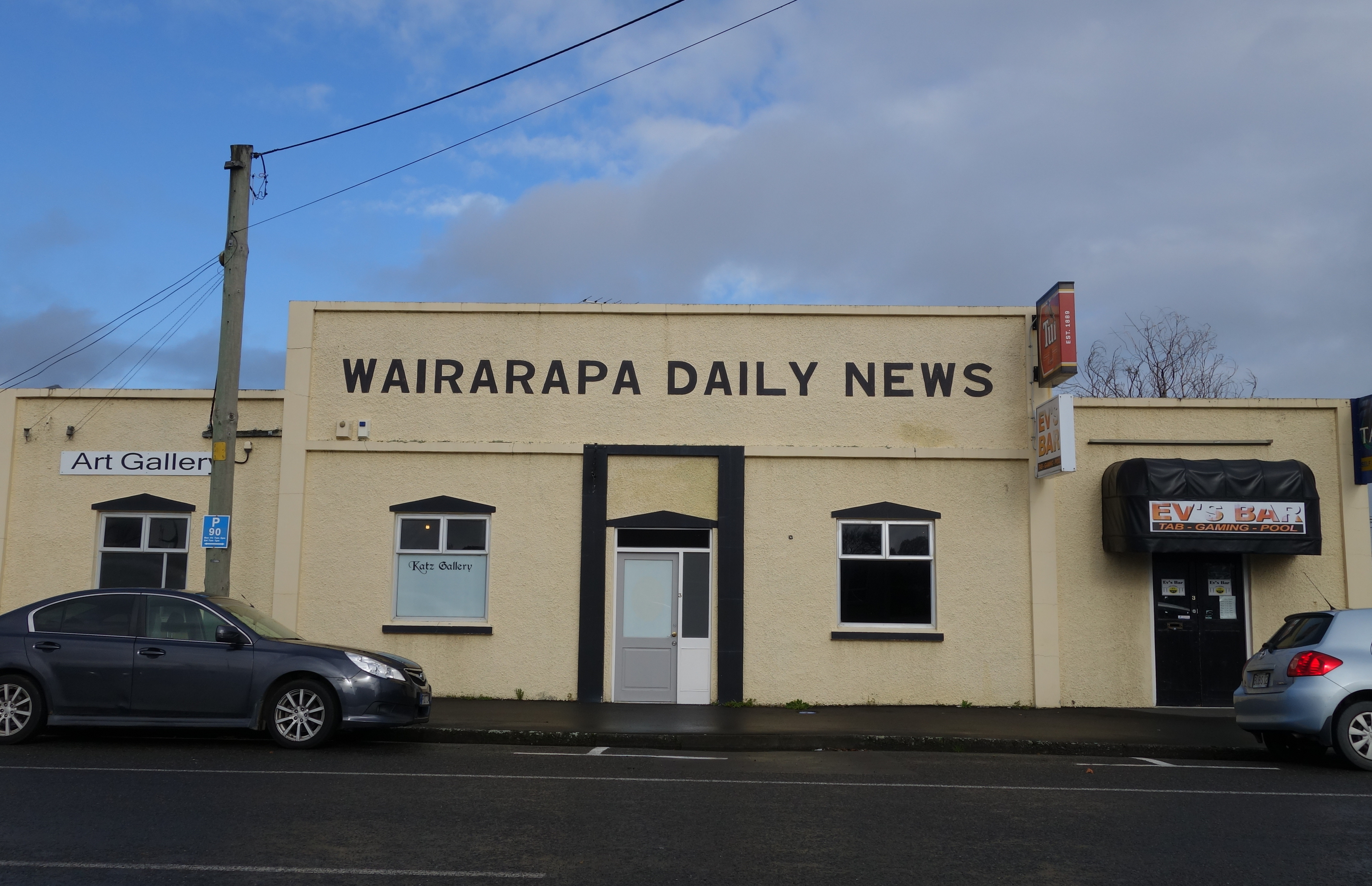
Newspaper offices

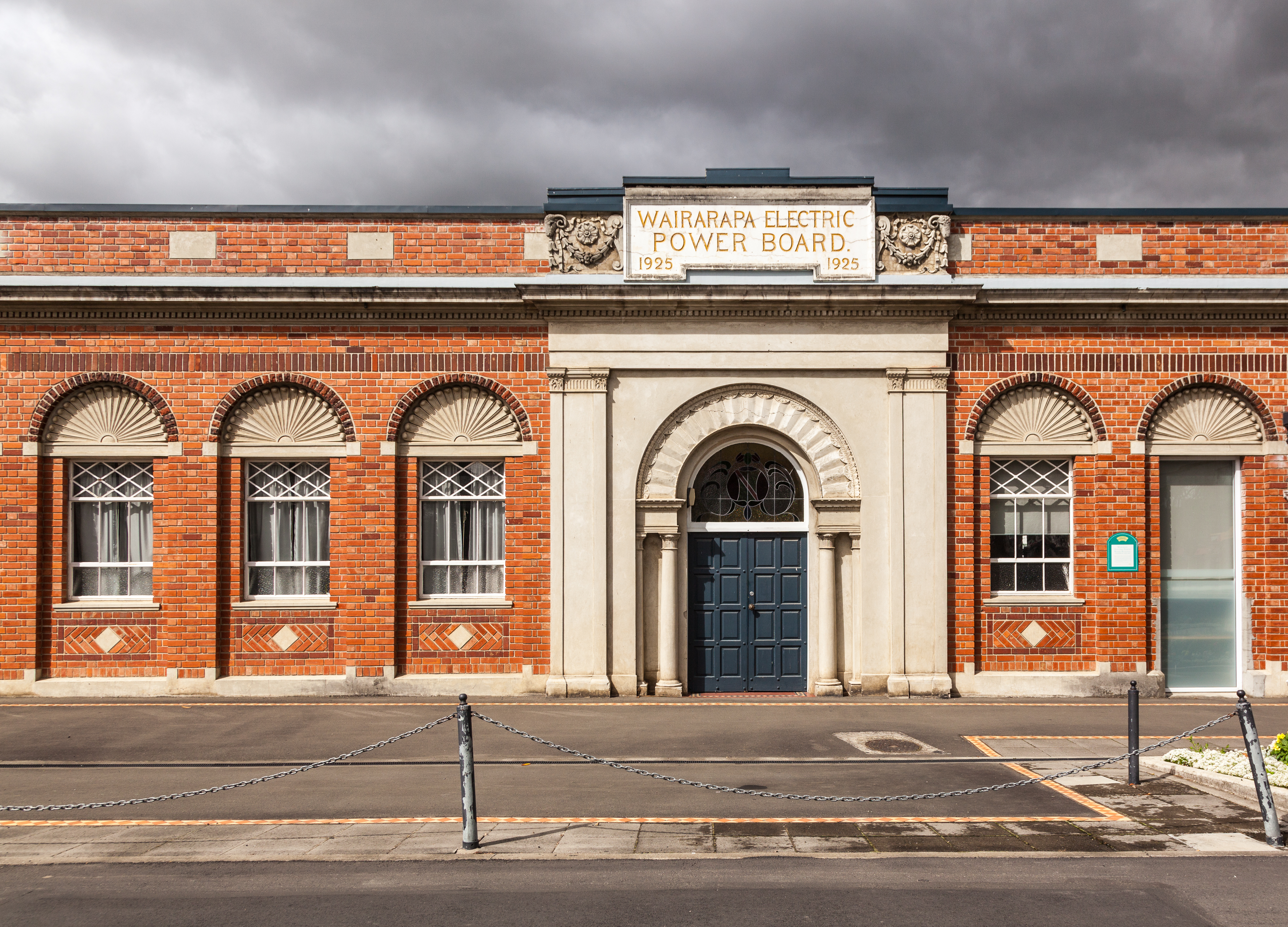
Wairarapa Electric Power Board building 1925

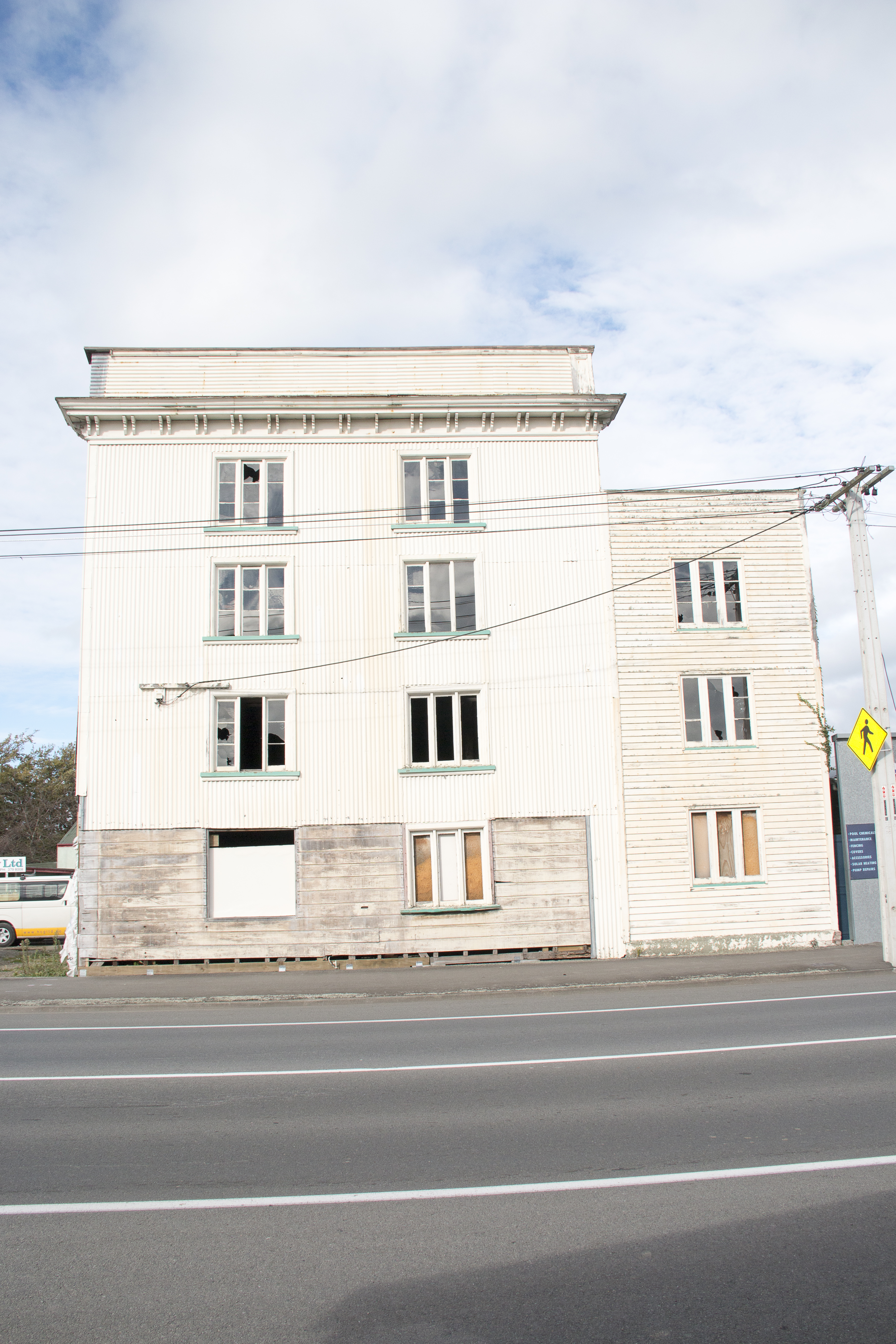
Wakelin's flour mill
NZHPT category 1

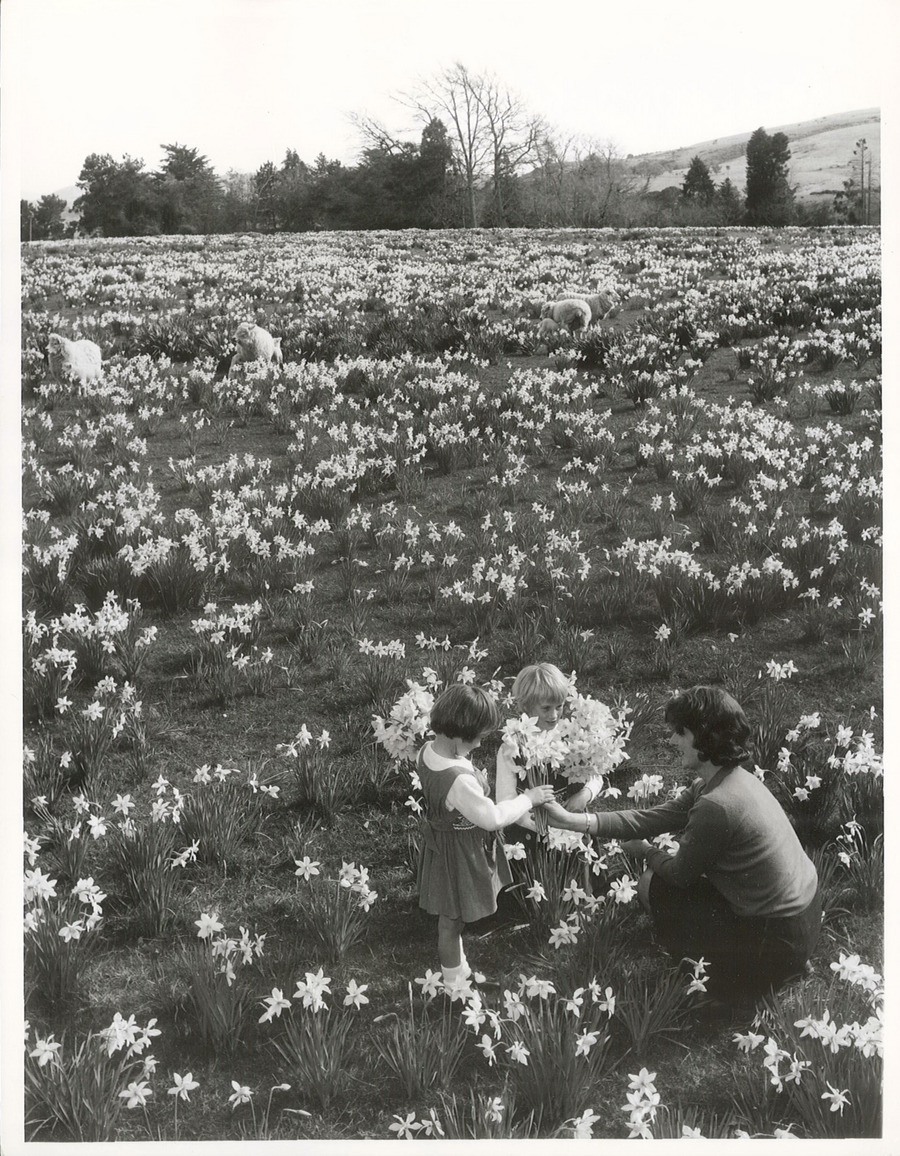
Daffodils at Middle Run

== See also ==
- Carterton railway station
- Fensham Reserve
- Matarawa Railway Station
- Wairarapa
- Category:Mayors of Carterton, New Zealand
