= Piripi Te Maari-o-te-rangi =

Ngāti Kahungunu leader, farmer, protester, orator

Piripi Te Maari-o-te-rangi (1837?–1895) was a Māori tribal leader, farmer, protester and orator of the Wairarapa in New Zealand. He identified with the Ngāti Kahungunu and Rākaiwhakairi iwi. In the 1830s his people were attacked by other tribes and Piripi Te Maari's parents took refuge at Waimārama in Hawke's Bay, which is where he was born, in about 1837. Some of his family returned to the Wairarapa in the 1840s. Piripi Te Maari, though, did not return until the 1850s, after being educated at a mission school near Gisborne. He became a successful farmer in the Wairarapa, and sought to prevent European settlers taking control of Lake Wairarapa and Lake Ōnoke, which were important food sources for Māori. However, in 1876, Te Hiko Pīata Tama-i-hikoia and other tribespeople made a deal to sell the fishing rights for the lower lake, to which Piripi Te Maari objected.
