= Piripi =

Piripi is a both a given name and a surname. It is a Māori transliteration of the name Philip or Phillips. Notable people with the name include:

== Given name ==
- Piripi Patiki (1813–1881), 19th-century Māori chief, teacher, and blind missionary from New Zealand
- Piripi Taumata-a-Kura (fl. 1823–1868), New Zealand evangelist
- Piripi Te Maari-o-te-rangi (1837?–1895), Ngāti Kahungunu leader, farmer, protester, orator

== Surname ==
- Ngahuia Piripi, New Zealand television actress

== See also ==
- Piripiri
