= Mount Holdsworth, New Zealand =

Rural locality in Wellington Region, New Zealand

Mount Holdsworth
- Locality
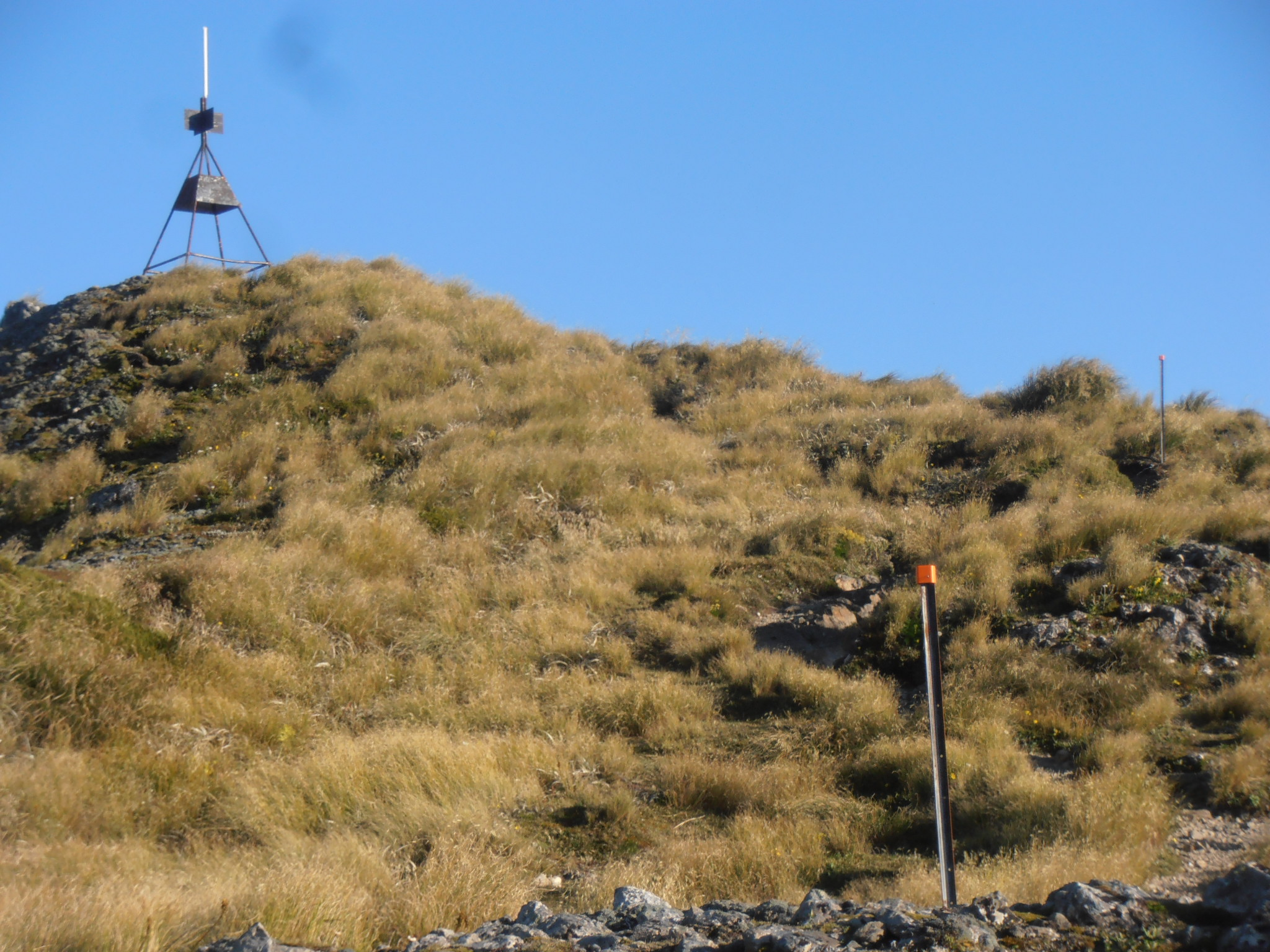
- Mt Holdsworth
- Interactive map of Mount Holdsworth
- Coordinates: 40.893°S 175.527°E
- Region: Wellington Region
- Territorial authority: Carterton District
- Electorates: Wairarapa; Ikaroa-Rāwhiti (Māori)

Government
  - Territorial Authority: Carterton District Council
  - Regional council: Greater Wellington Regional Council
  - Mayor of Carterton: Steve Cretney
  - Wairarapa MP: Mike Butterick
  - Ikaroa-Rāwhiti MP: Cushla Tangaere-Manuel

Area
  - Total: 279.24 km^{2} (107.82 sq mi)

Population (2023 census)
  - Total: 159
  - Density: 0.569/km^{2} (1.47/sq mi)

Mount Holdsworth is a rural locality and a statistical area in the Carterton District and Wellington Region of New Zealand's North Island. The locality is about 17 km north of Carterton by road, and the statistical area covers the entire district north and west of Carterton. The main eastern entrance to the Tararua Forest Park is from Mount Holdsworth.

== Demographics ==
Mount Holdsworth locality covers 279.24 km^{2} (107.82 sq mi). It is part of the larger Mount Holdsworth statistical area.

Historical population for the locality
Year	Pop.	±% p.a.
2006	213	—
2013	141	−5.72%
2018	135	−0.87%
2023	159	+3.33%
The 2006 population is for a larger area of 290.30 km^{2}. Source:

The locality had a population of 159 in the 2023 New Zealand census, an increase of 24 people (17.8%) since the 2018 census, and an increase of 18 people (12.8%) since the 2013 census. There were 81 males and 78 females in 66 dwellings. 5.7% of people identified as LGBTIQ+. The median age was 48.6 years (compared with 38.1 years nationally). There were 30 people (18.9%) aged under 15 years, 15 (9.4%) aged 15 to 29, 81 (50.9%) aged 30 to 64, and 33 (20.8%) aged 65 or older.

People could identify as more than one ethnicity. The results were 96.2% European (Pākehā), 9.4% Māori, 3.8% Asian, and 3.8% other, which includes people giving their ethnicity as "New Zealander". English was spoken by 98.1%, Māori by 3.8%, and other languages by 13.2%. No language could be spoken by 1.9% (e.g. too young to talk). The percentage of people born overseas was 17.0, compared with 28.8% nationally.

Religious affiliations were 20.8% Christian, 1.9% Hindu, 1.9% New Age, and 1.9% other religions. People who answered that they had no religion were 67.9%, and 9.4% of people did not answer the census question.

Of those at least 15 years old, 54 (41.9%) people had a bachelor's or higher degree, 60 (46.5%) had a post-high school certificate or diploma, and 9 (7.0%) people exclusively held high school qualifications. The median income was $38,700, compared with $41,500 nationally. 21 people (16.3%) earned over $100,000 compared to 12.1% nationally. The employment status of those at least 15 was 69 (53.5%) full-time, 21 (16.3%) part-time, and 3 (2.3%) unemployed.

=== Mount Holdsworth statistical area ===
Mount Holdsworth statistical area covers 432.87 km^{2} (167.13 sq mi) and also includes Dalefield. It had an estimated population of 2,060 as of June 2025, with a population density of 4.8 people per km^{2}.

Historical populations for the statistical area
Year	Pop.	±% p.a.
2006	1,341	—
2013	1,527	+1.87%
2018	1,767	+2.96%
2023	2,037	+2.88%

Mount Holdsworth statistical area had a population of 2,037 in the 2023 New Zealand census, an increase of 270 people (15.3%) since the 2018 census, and an increase of 510 people (33.4%) since the 2013 census. There were 1,017 males, 1,014 females, and 6 people of other genders in 765 dwellings. 2.5% of people identified as LGBTIQ+. The median age was 47.5 years (compared with 38.1 years nationally). There were 399 people (19.6%) aged under 15 years, 237 (11.6%) aged 15 to 29, 1,011 (49.6%) aged 30 to 64, and 393 (19.3%) aged 65 or older.

People could identify as more than one ethnicity. The results were 93.8% European (Pākehā); 10.8% Māori; 1.3% Pasifika; 2.4% Asian; 0.3% Middle Eastern, Latin American and African New Zealanders (MELAA); and 3.5% other, which includes people giving their ethnicity as "New Zealander". English was spoken by 97.9%, Māori by 2.4%, Samoan by 0.1%, and other languages by 8.7%. No language could be spoken by 1.8% (e.g. too young to talk). New Zealand Sign Language was known by 0.9%. The percentage of people born overseas was 18.9, compared with 28.8% nationally.

Religious affiliations were 29.9% Christian, 0.1% Hindu, 0.3% Islam, 0.4% Māori religious beliefs, 0.1% Buddhist, 0.7% New Age, and 1.0% other religions. People who answered that they had no religion were 57.9%, and 9.3% of people did not answer the census question.

Of those at least 15 years old, 384 (23.4%) people had a bachelor's or higher degree, 951 (58.1%) had a post-high school certificate or diploma, and 300 (18.3%) people exclusively held high school qualifications. The median income was $42,300, compared with $41,500 nationally. 249 people (15.2%) earned over $100,000 compared to 12.1% nationally. The employment status of those at least 15 was 867 (52.9%) full-time, 297 (18.1%) part-time, and 27 (1.6%) unemployed.
