= Georgina Beyer =

New Zealand politician (1957–2023)

Georgina Beyer MNZM JP
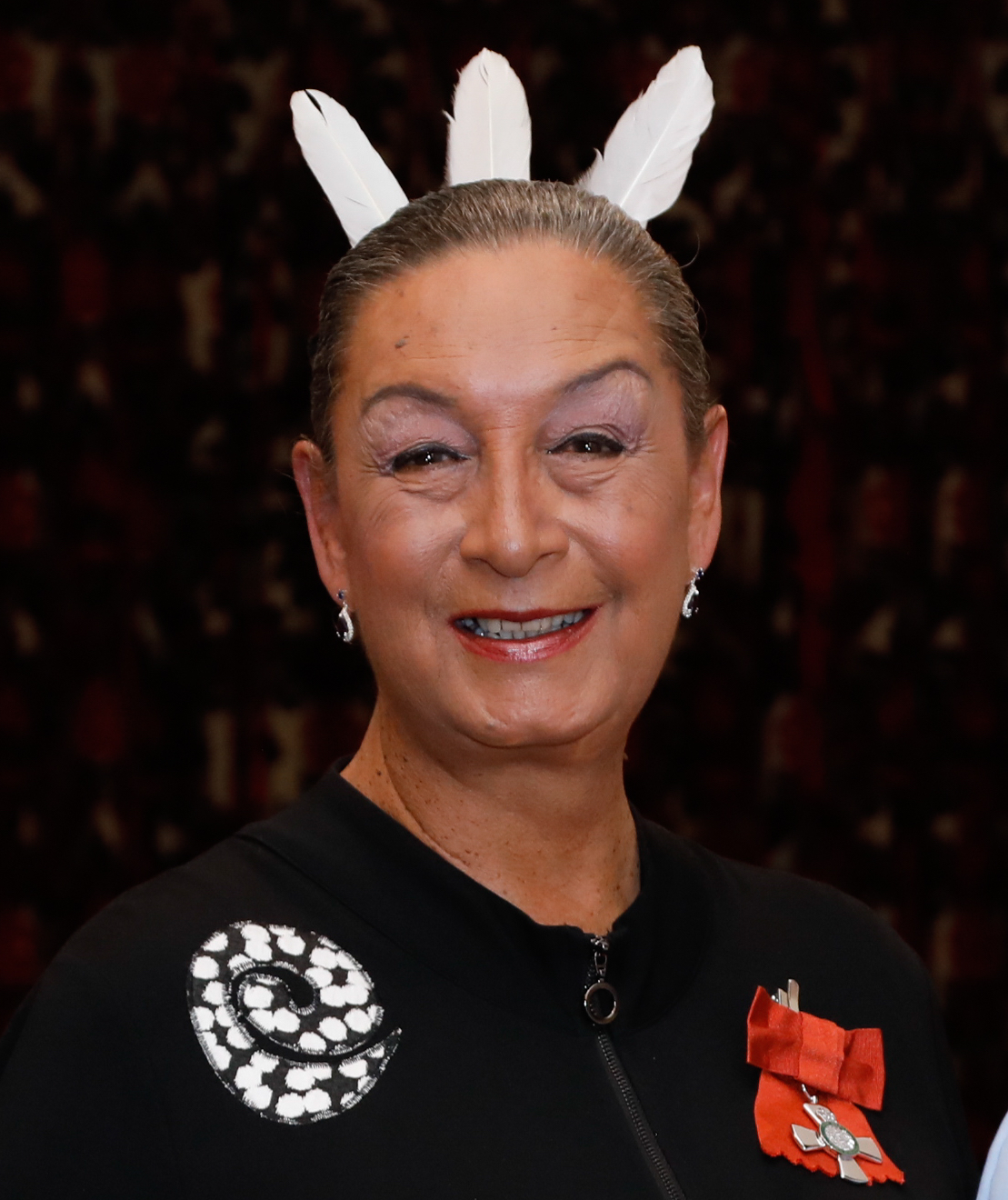
- Beyer in 2020

Member of New Zealand Parliament for Labour Party List
- In office 17 September 2005 – 14 February 2007
- Succeeded by: Lesley Soper (Note: Normally, list MPs do not have individual predecessors or successors, but Beyer resigned during a sitting parliament and therefore was succeeded by Soper.)

Member of the New Zealand Parliament for Wairarapa
- In office 27 November 1999 – 17 September 2005
- Preceded by: Wyatt Creech
- Succeeded by: John Hayes

20th Mayor of Carterton
- In office 1 November 1995 – 8 March 2000
- Deputy: Brian Cameron
- Preceded by: Barry Keys
- Succeeded by: Martin Tankersley

Personal details
- Born: November 1957 Wellington, New Zealand
- Died: 6 March 2023 (aged 65) Wellington, New Zealand
- Party: Mana Movement (2014)
- Other political affiliations: Labour (1999–2007)
- Relations: George Bertrand (grandfather)
- Parent: Colin Beyer (stepfather)

Georgina Beyer MNZM JP (November 1957 – 6 March 2023) was a New Zealand Labour Party politician who represented Wairarapa in the Parliament of New Zealand from 1999 to 2005, after serving as mayor of Carterton from 1995 to 1999. Beyer was the world's first openly transgender mayor, and the world's first openly transgender member of parliament. As a member of the Labour Party Beyer supported progressive policies including prostitution law reform, civil unions, anti-discrimination laws, and the promotion of Māori rights. She resigned in 2007, and, in 2014, unsuccessfully stood for election on behalf of the Mana Party.

== Early life ==
Born in 1957 at Wellington Hospital to Noeline (née Tamati) and Jack Bertrand and assigned male at birth, she was named after her grandfather, Lieutenant Colonel George Bertrand, who was second in command in the Māori Battalion. Her parents were living in Hataitai at the time of her birth. She was of European and Māori (Te Āti Awa, Ngāti Mutunga, Ngāti Raukawa, and Ngāti Porou) descent. Her mother had a second child with her first husband in December 1958, who was placed for adoption. Beyer was sent to live with her grandparents on their farm in Taranaki during this second pregnancy. Her parents divorced by 1962.

Her mother married again in 1962. Her mother's second husband was Colin Beyer, a recent law school graduate. The couple moved to Upper Hutt. Beyer, now aged four and a half years, returned to live with her mother and stepfather. Her brother was born in December 1963. Beyer attended Upper Hutt Primary School and from age seven, after the family moved to the Wellington suburb of Crofton Downs, Ngaio School. With marital problems developing between her mother and her stepfather, Beyer was sent to Wellesley College boarding school, where she attempted suicide amid feelings of rejection by her parents. From Form 2, she attended the school as a day pupil, as the hostel had closed. After her parents' marriage ended in 1971, financial constraints meant that a private school was no longer affordable, and Beyer attended Onslow College in Form 3. Beyer then moved with her mother and brother to Papatoetoe to be near family and friends, with Beyer attending Papatoetoe High School. Before enrolment, a legal surname change by deed poll from "Bertrand" to "Beyer" meant that the difference in family name did not have to be explained at school. It was also seen as socially advantageous for Beyer to be linked to her successful stepfather. Beyer began acting while at that school and decided to make a career out of it, leaving school at 16 (against her mother's will).

Beyer lived in Australia for some time, and in 1979 experienced a traumatic sexual assault in Sydney; she felt unable to seek help from the police, which led her to start thinking about a political career. On her return to New Zealand she began seeking work as an actor with increasing success, culminating in a GOFTA award nomination for best female performance for the television drama Jewel's Darl in 1987. In 1984, Beyer underwent gender-affirming surgery.

Beyer became a part of the Wellington gay nightclub scene, initially as a singer and drag queen performer, and later as a sex worker. After moving to Carterton, in the Wairarapa, she worked as a radio host. Beyer was the local news presenter and part of the inaugural breakfast crew on radio station Today FM, then owned by Paul Henry (whom she later defeated in the 1999 general election).

== Political career ==
=== Carterton ===
After her return to New Zealand and move to Carterton, Beyer began to take an interest in local politics, first winning election to a local school board. She was elected mayor of Carterton in 1995, which made her the world's first openly transgender mayor, as well as the first female mayor of Carterton and first Māori mayor in the Wairarapa district. In 1996, Wellington mayor Mark Blumsky said he thought she was "very good at her job". In 1998 she was re-elected with 90% of the vote. In 2000, she resigned, following her election to Parliament; in 2004 she said resigning was one of her biggest regrets.

=== Parliament ===
New Zealand Parliament
Years	Term	Electorate	List	Party
1999–2002	46th	Wairarapa	40	Labour
2002–2005	47th	Wairarapa	23	Labour
2005–2007	48th	List	35	Labour

At the 1999 general election, Beyer was selected as the Labour Party's candidate for the Wairarapa electorate. She surprised political commentators by winning the typically right-leaning electorate, with a 3,033-vote majority over former colleague and National candidate Paul Henry, and becoming the world's first transgender Member of Parliament. In her maiden speech, Beyer said:

Mr. Speaker, I can't help but mention the number of firsts that are in this Parliament. Our first Rastafarian [Nándor Tánczos]… our first Polynesian woman [Luamanuvao Winnie Laban]… and yes, I have to say it, I guess, I am the first transsexual in New Zealand to be standing in this House of Parliament. This is a first not only in New Zealand, ladies and gentlemen, but also in the world. This is an historic moment. We need to acknowledge that this country of ours leads the way in so many aspects. We have led the way for women getting the vote. We have led the way in the past, and I hope we will do so again in the future in social policy and certainly in human rights.

At the 2002 election, Beyer re-contested Wairarapa for Labour. She was easily re-elected with an increased majority of 6,372 votes.

In 2001, Annie Goldson and Peter Wells co-directed a documentary film about Beyer called Georgie Girl. It received a number of awards including the Excellence in Documentary Award at the 2002 San Francisco International Lesbian and Gay Film Festival and the Audience Award for Best Documentary at the 2002 Sydney Film Festival. Interviewed in the film, Beyer said: "I get asked questions no other politician would ever have to answer. Regarding the surgery, you know. 'Did it hurt?', or, 'When you have sex now as a woman, is it different to how you had sex as a man?' Well, honey, obviously."

=== Views ===
As an MP, Beyer supported progressive policies such as LGBTQ rights and Māori rights. In her speech to Parliament on the Prostitution Reform Act 2003, which decriminalised prostitution in New Zealand, she identified herself as a former sex worker. She influenced three MPs to vote for the Bill, which passed with 60 votes for, 59 against with one abstention. She then supported the Civil Union Act 2004, which legalised civil unions for same-sex and opposite-sex couples at a time when gay marriage was still not an option in New Zealand. She confronted followers of Destiny Church on the steps of the Parliament building during their protest against the bill.

In 2001 Beyer supported the addition of sexual orientation as a ground of prohibited discrimination under the Human Rights Act 1993. In 2004 she put forward a member's bill that would add gender identity a prohibited ground. She withdrew the bill after the Solicitor-General provided a legal opinion confirming that gender identity was already covered by existing law.

Beyer supported use of the Māori language by government and public institutions, and was instrumental to the passage of the Māori Language Act 2003. She personally opposed the government's seabed and foreshore legislation of May 2004, but voted in favour of it due to her electorate's preferences. She asked the Labour Party if she could abstain from the vote but was refused; she later said that vowed that "from that time on that I would never be torn between who and what I am as far as my heritage is concerned, and political expediency".

=== Retirement ===
In early 2004, Beyer announced that she would not stand in the 2005 elections. Tension with her electorate committee, which opposed Beyer's views on the seabed and foreshore, may also have contributed to the decision. In September, Beyer changed her mind. She announced that she would seek a position on the Labour list, without recontesting the Wairarapa seat. She stated that a rally by the conservative Destiny Church the previous month had influenced her decision, as she believed that the message of such rallies must be opposed. A year later, she decided again she would resign.

Beyer resigned from parliament effective from 15 February 2007, and gave her valedictory speech to Parliament on the previous day.

In 2010, Beyer stated that she was struggling financially since leaving politics and was applying for welfare.

=== 2014 Mana candidacy for Te Tai Tonga ===
On 27 July 2014, the Mana Party announced that Beyer would stand for Mana in the Te Tai Tonga constituency in the 2014 New Zealand general election.

Beyer was critical of the Internet–Mana alliance. She expressed her wariness towards Kim Dotcom, saying that "he [was] using his power and position to seek retribution on people who have done him wrong", and wished that he would have taken a backseat in campaigning. She further criticised Dotcom for "pulling the strings" behind Internet-Mana. Beyer believed the relationship between the two parties was not mutually beneficial, considering that Mana candidates did not receive equal treatment within the partnership. She said that her campaign ran on "thin air", and later refused to participate on the national tour.

Beyer regarded her 2014 candidacy as "a way of making amends to Māori for voting for the foreshore and seabed bill". After it was unsuccessful, she said her candidacy was a personal favour to her acquaintance Hone Harawira and that she had not expected to win.

== Public speaking ==
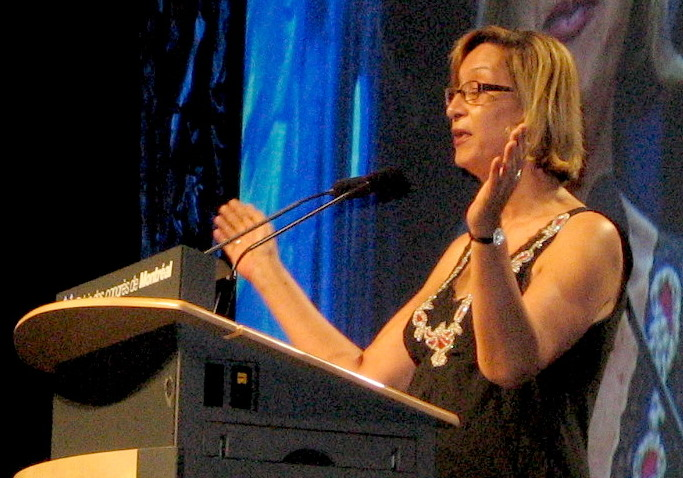
Beyer speaking at a conference in 2006

Beyer was a keynote speaker at the first International Conference on LGBT Human Rights in Montreal in 2006 and the second International Conference in Copenhagen in 2009, as well as for the Egale Canada Human Rights Trust's annual Gala, held in Toronto on 24 September 2010.

Beyer was invited as a speaker to a public event at Oxford University's debating society Oxford Union on 23 October 2018, and at the University of Cambridge's Cambridge Union on 31 October 2018. She was the first person of Māori descent to address the Oxford Union.

== Honours and awards ==
In 2000, Beyer was voted Supreme Queer of the Year at the Queer of the Year Awards.

In the 2020 Queen's Birthday Honours, Beyer was appointed a Member of the New Zealand Order of Merit, for services to LGBTIQA+ rights. Beyer said of the honour:

I'm proud that [the Queen's Birthday honour] is another feather in the cap for the rainbow community and the transgender community, but it wouldn't have happened without the people of Wairarapa. Rural, conservative people who overlooked my colourful past, looked at the substance of me and gave me a shot.

== Kidney transplant and death ==
Beyer was diagnosed with kidney failure in 2013. During the 2014 election, and until she received a transplant in 2017, she received kidney dialysis four times a day, seven days a week. After receiving her transplant she resumed public appearances.

Beyer died on 6 March 2023 at the Mary Potter Hospice in Wellington, at age 65. Wairarapa MP Kieran McAnulty, whom she babysat, described her as "a beloved family member, loyal friend, passionate advocate for the LGBTQIA+ community and a powerhouse of a local politician", and prime minister Chris Hipkins said she "has blazed a trail that makes it much easier for others to follow". Finance minister Grant Robertson said he will always remember her courage. Former prime minister Helen Clark said her popularity grew from her honesty. A street in a new housing development in Carterton will be named Georgina Beyer Way in her honour.

== See also ==
- LGBT rights in New Zealand
- Prostitution in New Zealand
- Transgender rights in New Zealand

== Notes ==
New Zealand Parliament
Preceded by Wyatt Creech	Member of Parliament for Wairarapa; 1999–2005	Succeeded by John Hayes
