= Mal Matheson =

New Zealand cricketer

- Mal Matheson in 1931

Personal information
- Born: 27 February 1906
- Died: 31 December 1985 (aged 79); Auckland, New Zealand
- Batting: Right-handed
- Bowling: Right-arm medium
- Relatives: Cathy Penney (daughter)

International information
- National side: New Zealand (1930–1931)
- Test debut (cap 17): 21 February 1930 v England
- Last Test: 15 August 1931 v England

Career statistics
| Competition | Test | First-class |
|---|---|---|
| Matches | 2 | 69 |
| Runs scored | 7 | 1,844 |
| Batting average | 7.00 | 23.64 |
| 100s/50s | 0/0 | 1/11 |
| Top score | 7 | 112 |
| Balls bowled | 282 | 5,536 |
| Wickets | 2 | 194 |
| Bowling average | 68.00 | 28.53 |
| 5 wickets in innings | 0 | 2 |
| 10 wickets in match | 0 | 0 |
| Best bowling | 2/7 | 5/50 |
| Catches/stumpings | 2/– | 44/– |
- Source: Cricinfo, 1 April 2017

Alexander Malcolm Matheson (27 February 1906 – 31 December 1985) was a New Zealand cricketer who played in two Test matches, the Fourth Test of New Zealand's initial Test series, against England in 1929–30, and, when he toured England with the New Zealanders in 1931, the rain-ruined Third Test.

== Domestic career ==
An opening bowler and useful lower-order batsman, he played for Auckland from 1926–27 to 1939–40, and for Wellington from 1944–45 to 1946–47. His one century came for Auckland in the match against Canterbury in 1937–38, when he was the fourth of Auckland's century-makers in a score of 590. His best bowling figures were 5 for 50 (after 3 for 19 in the first innings) for North Island against South Island in 1944–45. Earlier in the season he had figures of 11.5–9–4–3 for Wellington against Otago.

== Rugby career ==
He also played Rugby union, and refereed the match between New Zealand and Australia in Auckland in 1946.
