= Fensham Reserve =

Forest reserve in North Island, New Zealand

- John Fensham Memorial Sanctuary
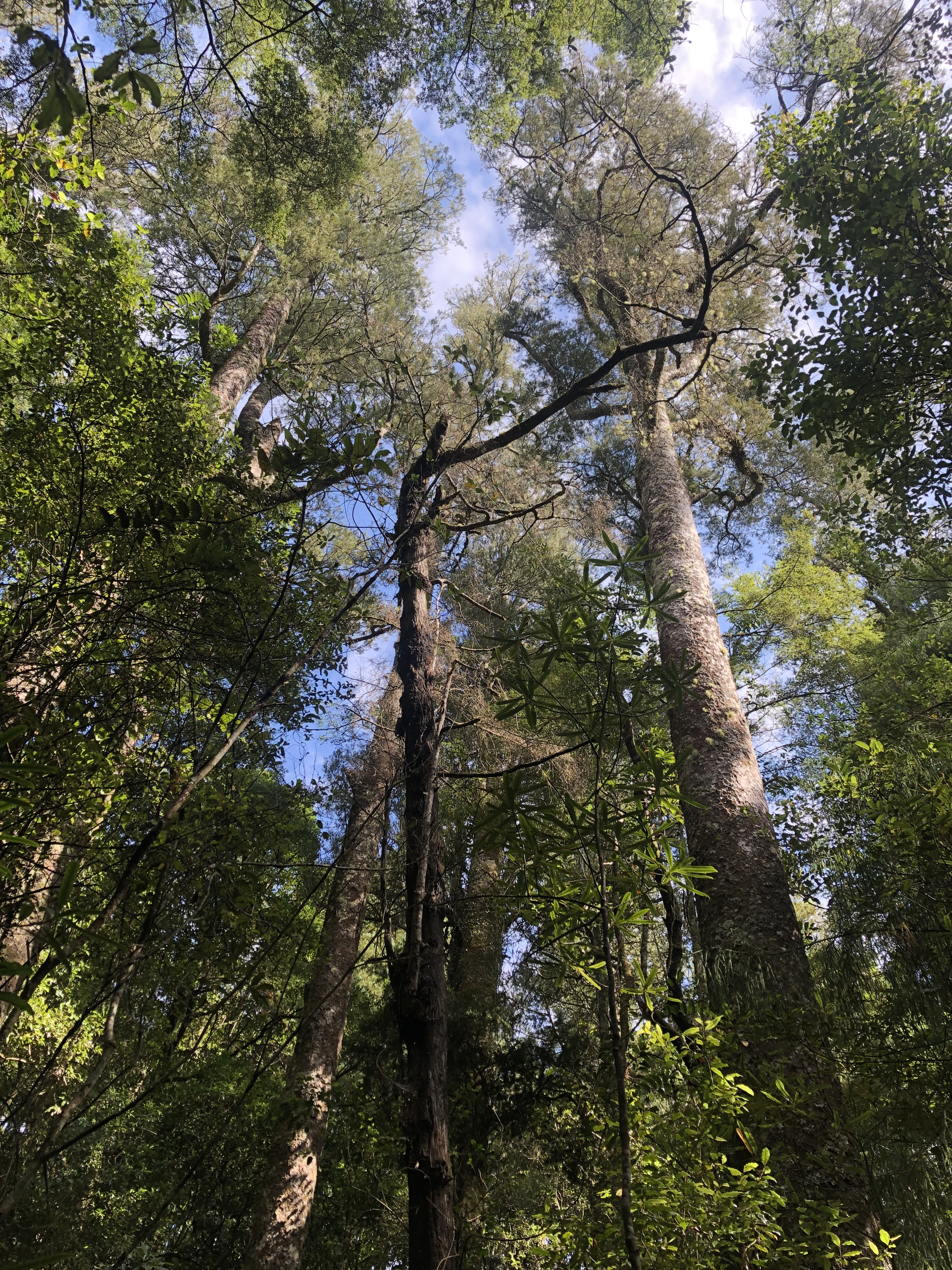
- Kahikatea in Fensham Reserve
- Interactive map of Fensham Reserve
- Location: Wairarapa region, New Zealand
- Nearest town: Carterton
- Coordinates: 40°59′45″S 175°30′26″E
- Area: 48 hectares (120 acres)
- Operator: Forest & Bird
- Website: www.forestandbird.org.nz/projects/fensham-reserve-carterton

Fensham Reserve is a protected native forest remnant in the Wairarapa region of the North Island of New Zealand, located north-west of Carterton. The area of the reserve is 48 ha (120 acres), mostly of primary forest, with 19 ha (47 acres) of regenerating forest and 3 ha (7.4 acres) of wetlands.

== History ==
The land that is now the reserve was purchased by John Fensham in 1883, with the specific intention of preserving the forest. His daughter Ruby Fensham gifted the land to the Royal Forest and Bird Protection Society in 1957, and the title was finally settled on her death in 1978.

In 2001, the area of the Fensham Reserve was declared by Government as protected private land, under the scenic reserves section of the Reserves Act 1977.

In 2024, the Forest & Bird group of volunteers that looks after the Fensham Reserve made a proposal to Carterton District Council to allocate land associated with the defunct Belvedere Hall as the beginnings of a wildlife corridor between Fensham Reserve and the nearby Tararua Forest Park. The proposal cited concerns over the decline in biodiversity in the reserve because of its isolation in the middle of farmland.

== Biodiversity ==
The forest in the reserve is mainly black beech, with small areas of forest types that are regionally threatened in the Wellington Region, including kahikatea – pukatea forest, and tōtara – tītoki forest. Swamp forest in the reserve includes kahikatea and other podocarps that may be 700 years old. The area of regenerating forest includes black beech, tōtara and mānuka.

The area of the Fensham Reserve makes up the majority of the Fensham Key Native Ecosystem (KNE) – a region defined by the Wellington Regional Council in the catchment of the Mangātarere Stream east of the Tararua Ranges. Land within the KNE is classified in the two highest categories of threatened ecosystems, meaning that there is less than 10-20% of original indigenous vegetation remaining on these types of land in New Zealand.

Native birds seen in the reserve include kererū, bellbird, tūī, kākā, grey warbler, fantail and kingfisher. An endangered freshwater fish, the brown mudfish (Neochanna apoda) is found in the wetland. Protected wetlands such as Fensham have high conservation value for the mudfish because it is highly threatened in other locations.

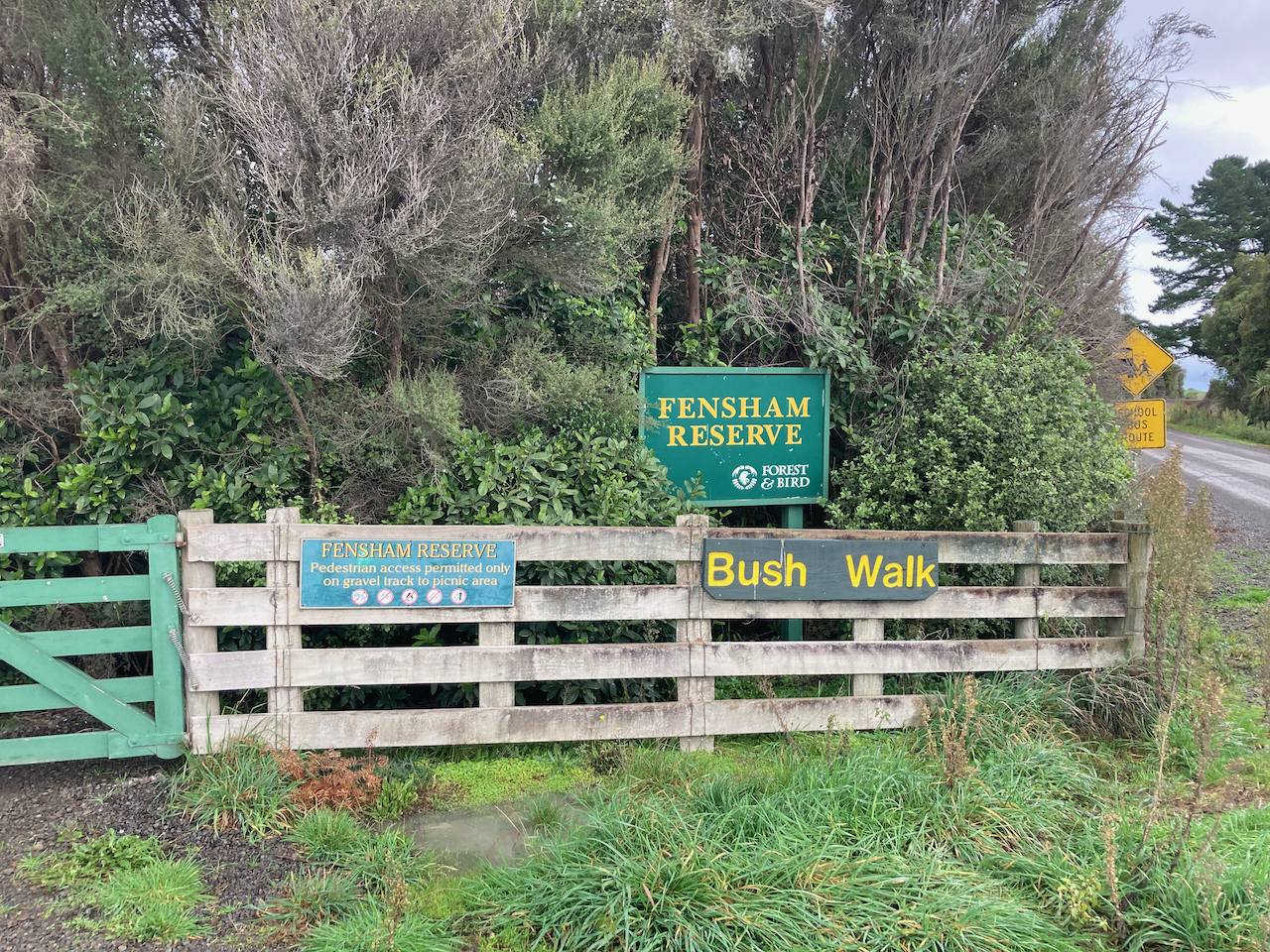
Fensham Reserve entrance

== Water race ==
A water supply race known as the Carrington Water Race passes through the reserve. It was established over a hundred years ago, sourcing water from the Mangātarere Stream to provide freshwater for irrigation, livestock, and domestic use.

== Access ==
The reserve is located around 4.7 km (2.9 mi) from Carterton, and is open to the public. There is a loop track through the reserve plus two cross-tracks, with boardwalks over wet areas.

== Awards ==
In 2002, the Forest & Bird Fensham group that looks after the reserve was recognised with an award for outstanding contributions to conservation.

== Gallery ==
Fensham Reserve

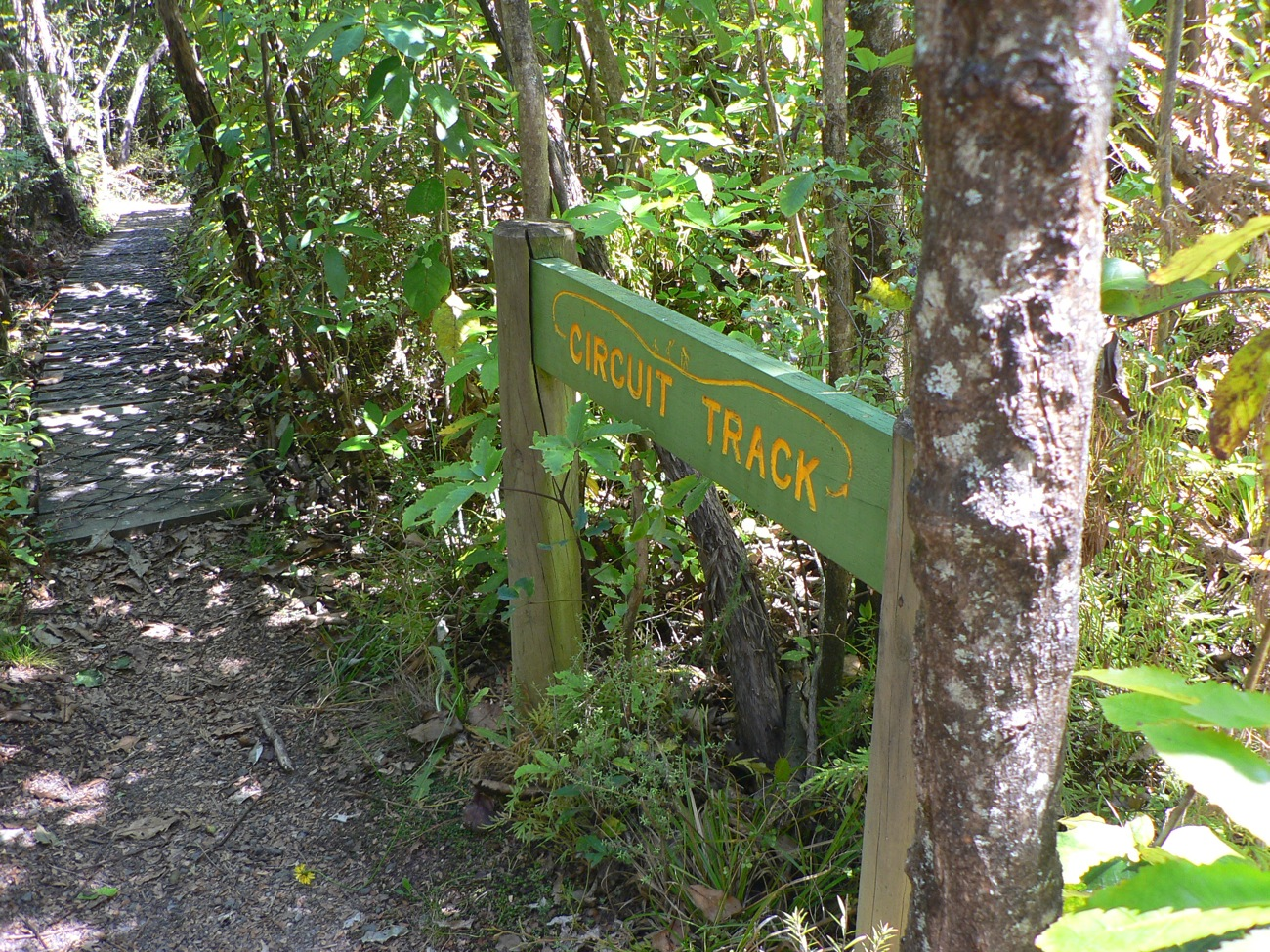
Circuit track

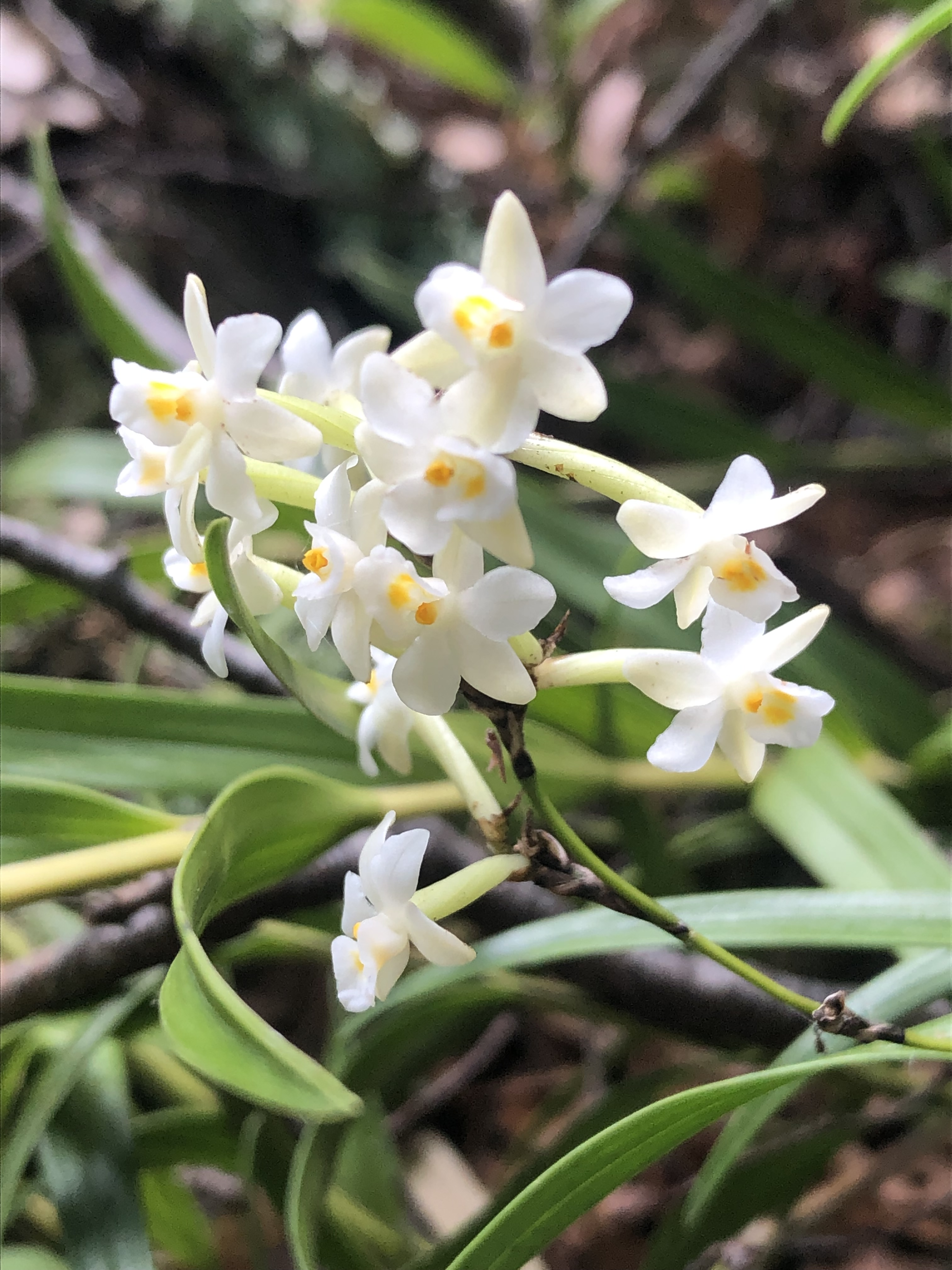
Earina autumnalis inflorescence on forest floor

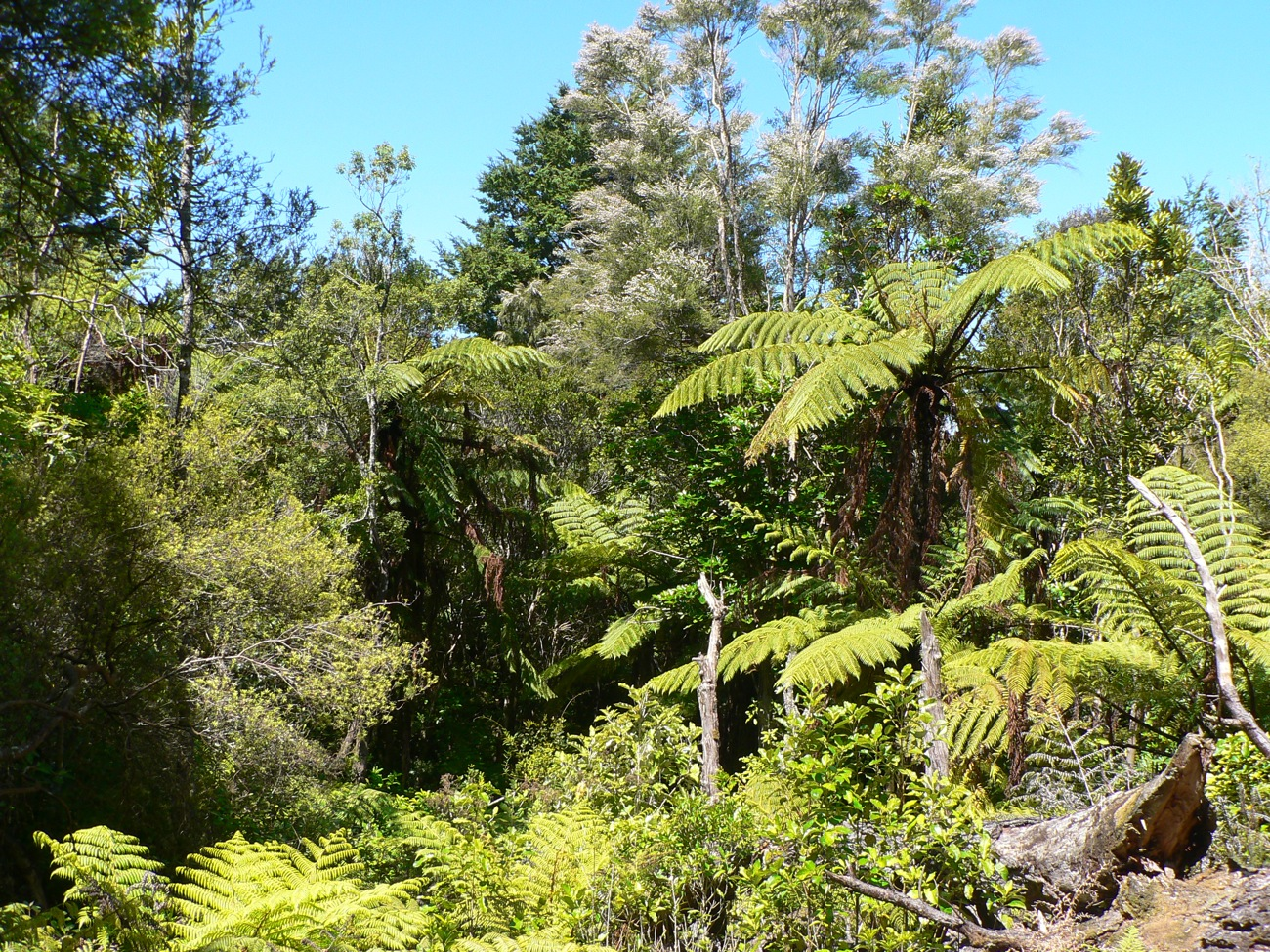
Forest scene

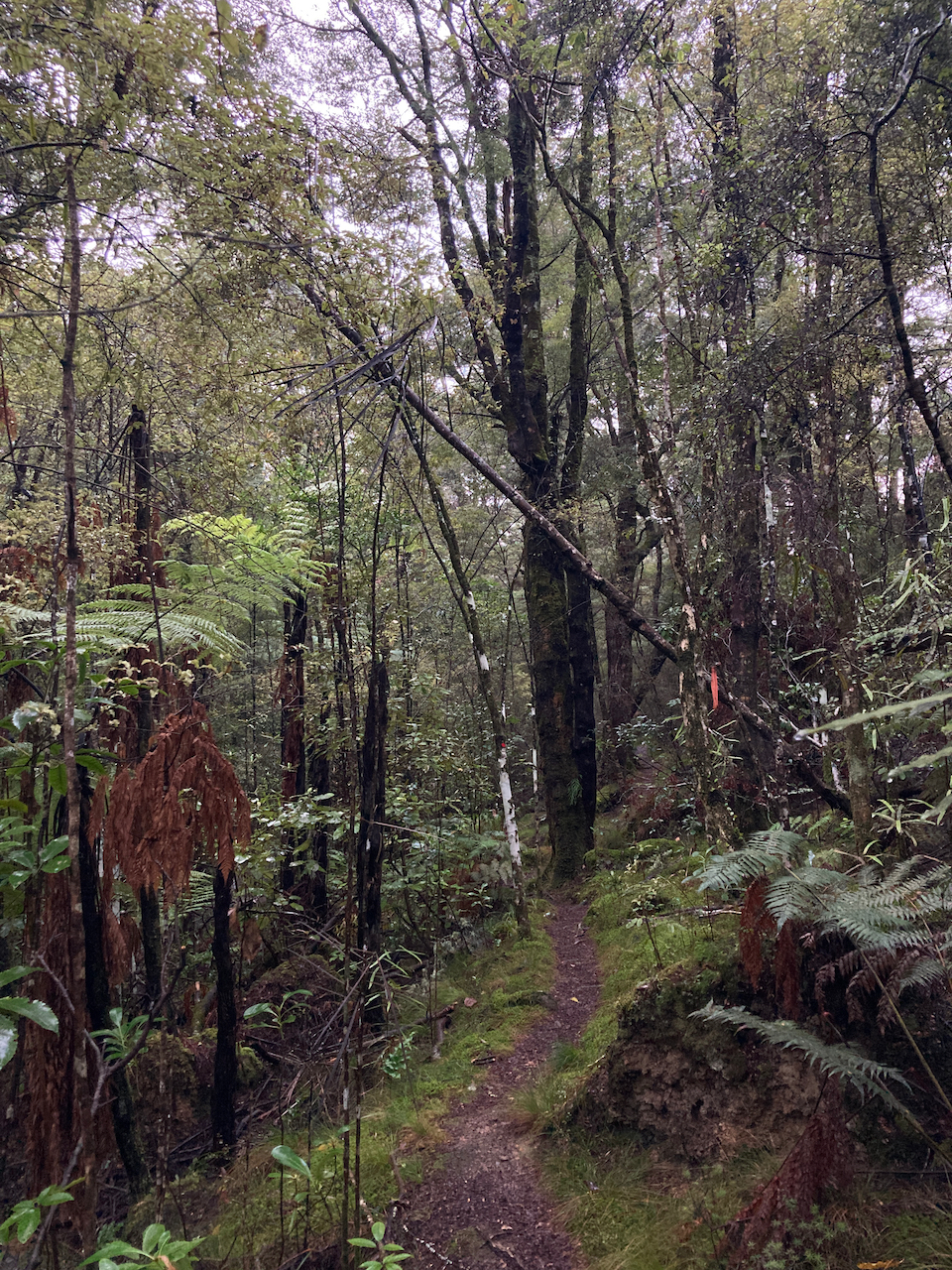
Forest track

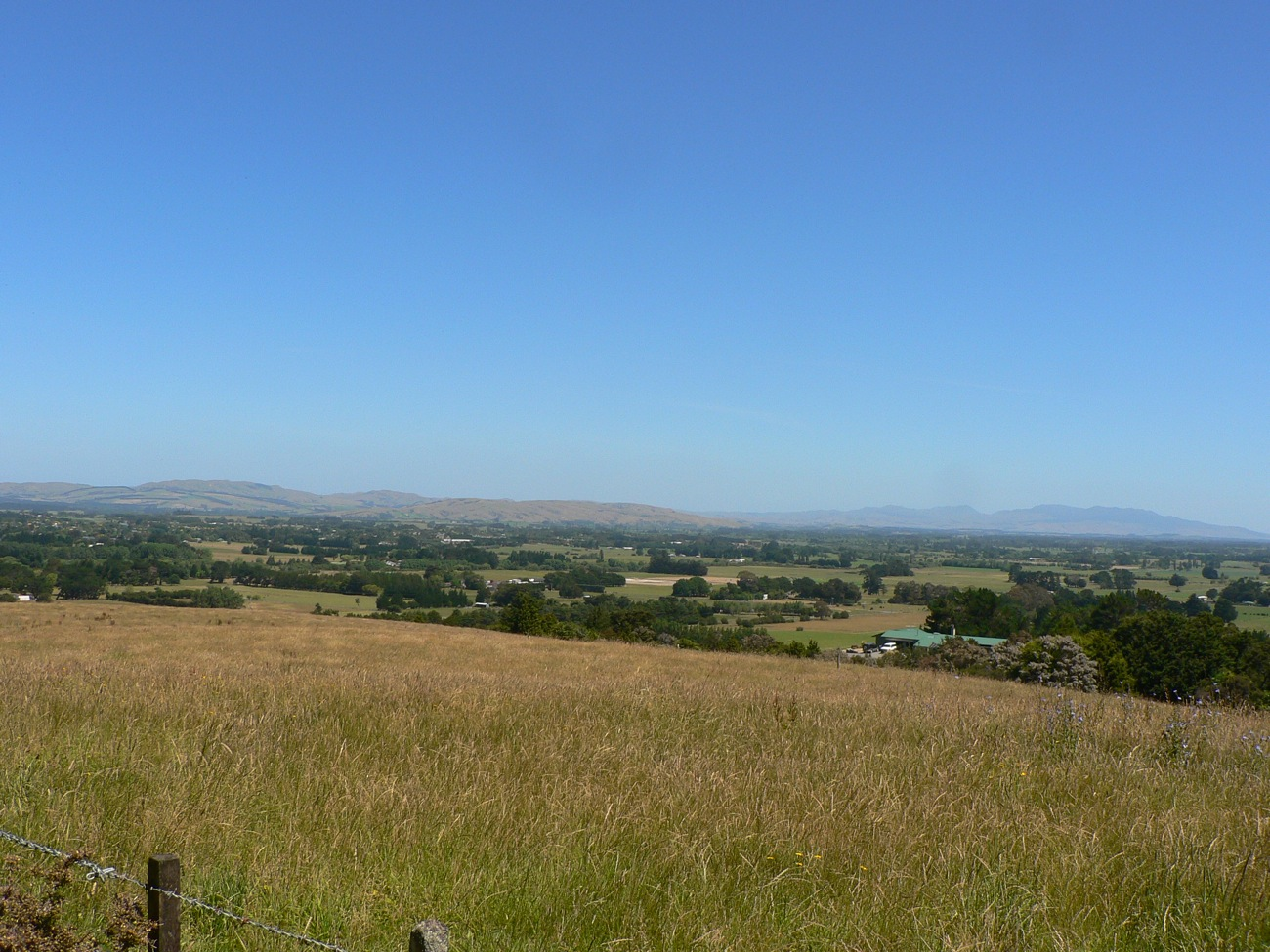
View from the lookout
