= Kokotau =

Rural locality in Wellington Region, New Zealand

- Locality
- Interactive map of Kokotau
- Coordinates: 41.079°S 175.563°E
- Region: Wellington Region
- Territorial authority: Carterton District
- Electorates: Wairarapa; Ikaroa-Rāwhiti (Māori)

Government
  - Territorial Authority: Carterton District Council
  - Regional council: Greater Wellington Regional Council
  - Mayor of Carterton: Steve Cretney
  - Wairarapa MP: Mike Butterick
  - Ikaroa-Rāwhiti MP: Cushla Tangaere-Manuel

Area
  - Total: 21.49 km^{2} (8.30 sq mi)

Population (2023 census)
  - Total: 201
  - Density: 9.35/km^{2} (24.2/sq mi)

Kokotau is a rural locality and a statistical area in the Carterton District and Wellington Region of New Zealand's North Island. The locality is about 8 km southeast of Carterton by road, and the statistical area covers the district east of Carterton to the Ruamāhanga and Waingawa rivers.

There was a bridge over the Ruamāhanga at Kokotau in 1885. A new bridge was opened in 1892, but was damaged by floods the following year, and again in 1897. The timber truss bridge was replaced by the current concrete pier and girder bridge in 1930.

Kokotau School flourished in 1898.

== Demographics ==
Kokotau locality covers 21.49 km^{2} (8.30 sq mi). It is part of the larger Kokotau statistical area.

Historical population for Kokotau locality
Year	Pop.	±% p.a.
2006	129	—
2013	153	+2.47%
2018	189	+4.32%
2023	201	+1.24%

The locality had a population of 201 in the 2023 New Zealand census, an increase of 12 people (6.3%) since the 2018 census, and an increase of 48 people (31.4%) since the 2013 census. There were 105 males, 96 females, and 3 people of other genders in 72 dwellings. 3.0% of people identified as LGBTIQ+. The median age was 46.8 years (compared with 38.1 years nationally). There were 36 people (17.9%) aged under 15 years, 27 (13.4%) aged 15 to 29, 102 (50.7%) aged 30 to 64, and 36 (17.9%) aged 65 or older.

People could identify as more than one ethnicity. The results were 95.5% European (Pākehā), 10.4% Māori, 1.5% Pasifika, and 3.0% Asian. English was spoken by 98.5%, and other languages by 9.0%. No language could be spoken by 1.5% (e.g. too young to talk). The percentage of people born overseas was 14.9, compared with 28.8% nationally.

Religious affiliations were 31.3% Christian. People who answered that they had no religion were 62.7%, and 6.0% of people did not answer the census question.

Of those at least 15 years old, 54 (32.7%) people had a bachelor's or higher degree, 81 (49.1%) had a post-high school certificate or diploma, and 33 (20.0%) people exclusively held high school qualifications. The median income was $54,200, compared with $41,500 nationally. 30 people (18.2%) earned over $100,000 compared to 12.1% nationally. The employment status of those at least 15 was 84 (50.9%) full-time, 33 (20.0%) part-time, and 6 (3.6%) unemployed.

=== Kokotau statistical area ===
Kokotau statistical area covers 120.58 km^{2} (46.56 sq mi). It had an estimated population of 1,320 as of June 2025, with a population density of 10.9 people per km^{2}.

Historical population for the statistical area
Year	Pop.	±% p.a.
2006	909	—
2013	1,149	+3.40%
2018	1,221	+1.22%
2023	1,275	+0.87%

Kokotau had a population of 1,275 in the 2023 New Zealand census, an increase of 54 people (4.4%) since the 2018 census, and an increase of 126 people (11.0%) since the 2013 census. There were 663 males, 609 females, and 3 people of other genders in 486 dwellings. 3.3% of people identified as LGBTIQ+. The median age was 46.2 years (compared with 38.1 years nationally). There were 237 people (18.6%) aged under 15 years, 186 (14.6%) aged 15 to 29, 621 (48.7%) aged 30 to 64, and 231 (18.1%) aged 65 or older.

People could identify as more than one ethnicity. The results were 93.9% European (Pākehā); 12.0% Māori; 2.4% Pasifika; 2.6% Asian; 0.2% Middle Eastern, Latin American and African New Zealanders (MELAA); and 3.3% other, which includes people giving their ethnicity as "New Zealander". English was spoken by 98.1%, Māori by 1.4%, Samoan by 0.2%, and other languages by 7.3%. No language could be spoken by 1.6% (e.g. too young to talk). The percentage of people born overseas was 16.2, compared with 28.8% nationally.

Religious affiliations were 32.7% Christian, 0.5% New Age, 0.2% Jewish, and 0.7% other religions. People who answered that they had no religion were 59.8%, and 6.4% of people did not answer the census question.

Of those at least 15 years old, 252 (24.3%) people had a bachelor's or higher degree, 561 (54.0%) had a post-high school certificate or diploma, and 216 (20.8%) people exclusively held high school qualifications. The median income was $44,300, compared with $41,500 nationally. 144 people (13.9%) earned over $100,000 compared to 12.1% nationally. The employment status of those at least 15 was 540 (52.0%) full-time, 198 (19.1%) part-time, and 27 (2.6%) unemployed.
