= Madeleine Marie Slavick =

Author and photographer

Madeleine Slavick / 思樂維
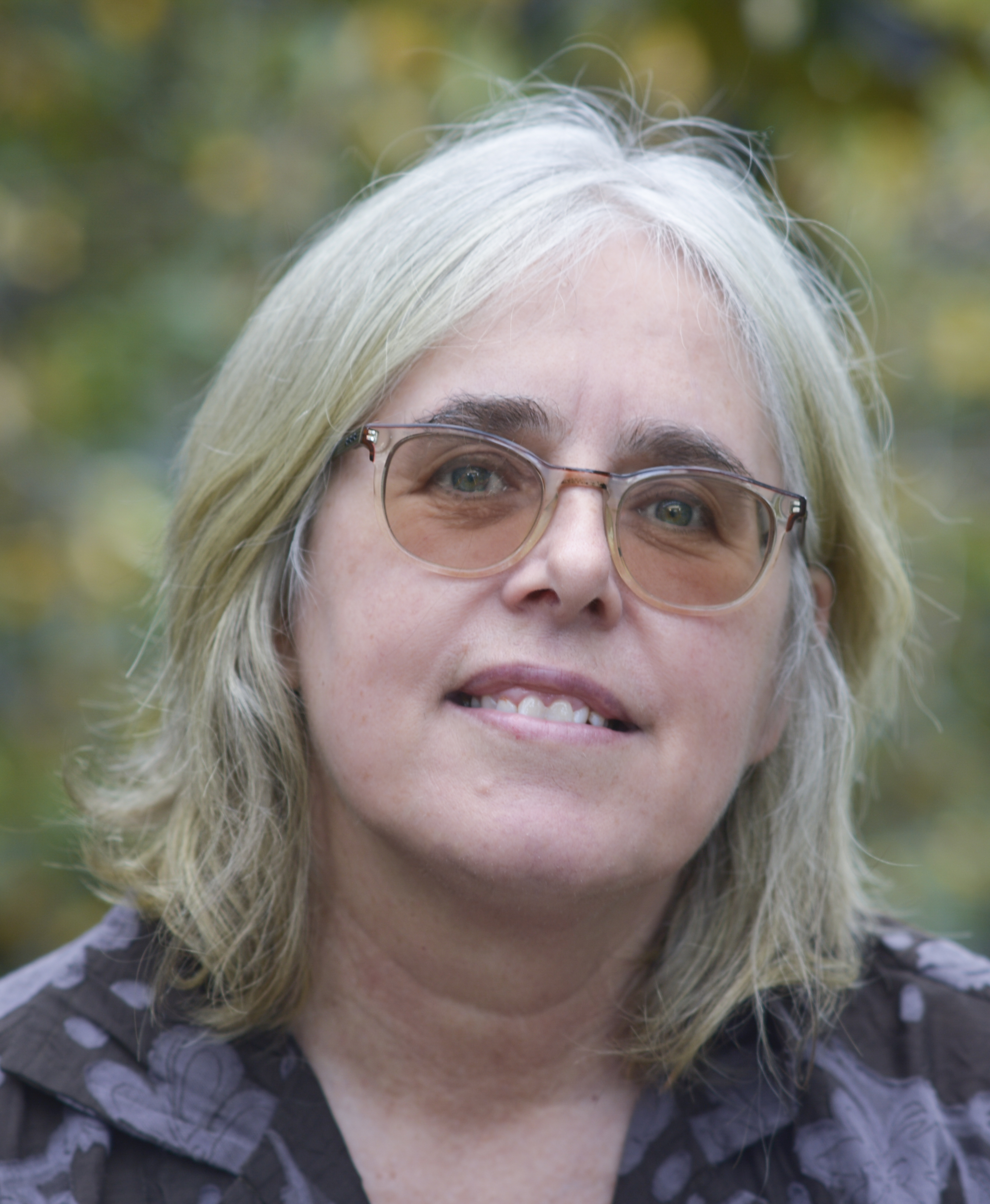
- Known for: writer, photographer
- Notable work: HONG香KONG港SONG嗓, Delicate Access 微妙之途, My Favourite Thing 我最寶貴的 and Fifty Stories, Fifty Images
- Awards: 2022 Parkin Prize Finalist / 2015 R.A.K Mason Fellow / 2013 International Flash Fiction Day Competition Finalist / 2012 Charles Rooking Carter Awards Finalist / 1998 Bumbershoot Book Award

Madeleine Slavick is an author and photographer. Her writing and photography have been published and exhibited internationally.

== Biography ==
Madeleine Slavick was born in the United States, moved to Hong Kong where she lived from 1988 to 2012, and then to New Zealand, where she is now based.

She also exhibits with her three artist-sisters, Susanne Slavick, Sarah Slavick, and Elin O’Hara Slavick.
