= Cathy Penney =

New Zealand aviator

Catherine Penney is a New Zealand pilot and aviation instructor. She was the first woman in New Zealand to gain her helicopter pilot's licence.

Penney (née Matheson) learned to fly in 1960 at Wellington Aero Club in Piper Cubs, and in 1964 gained instructor ratings at Auckland Flying School at Ardmore. In 1975 she was the first woman in New Zealand to gain a helicopter pilot's licence, and in 1978 became New Zealand's first female helicopter instructor. In 1981 Penney started Heli-Flight Wairarapa with Laurie Bargh. Penney later worked for the Civil Aviation Authority as an auditor and as a member of the Personnel Licensing team, inspecting flight training organisations and testing flight examiners. She retired in 2017.

Penney's father, Mal Matheson, played Test cricket for New Zealand.
