= Lake Ferry =

Village in the North Island of New Zealand

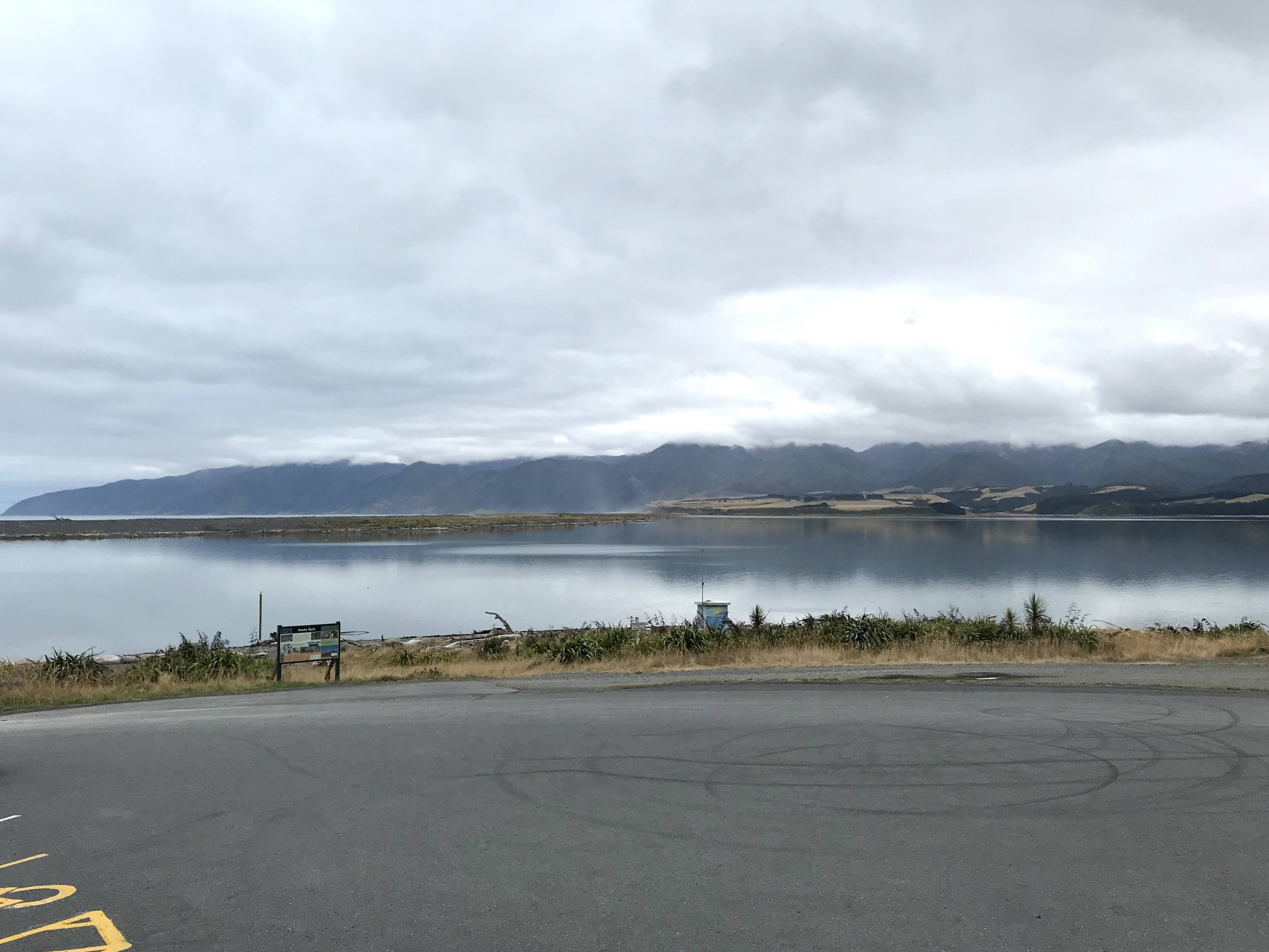
- View towards Remutaka Range from Lake Ferry hotel
- Interactive map of Lake Ferry
- Coordinates: 41.39421°S 175.14374°E
- Country: New Zealand
- Region: Wellington
- Territorial authority: South Wairarapa
- Time zone: UTC+12 (NZST)
  - Summer (DST): UTC+13 (NZDT)
- Area code: 04

Lake Ferry is a small coastal settlement in Palliser Bay, on the southern coast of the North Island of New Zealand. It is in the South Wairarapa District, located 35 kilometres (22 mi) south-west of Martinborough, on the eastern shore of Lake Ōnoke. The coast is a popular fishing location and the settlement is a mixture of permanent and holiday homes, and a camping ground. There is a historic hotel close to the sea coast at the point where Lake Ōnoke flows into Palliser Bay. The name of the settlement and the hotel arises from a ferry service that previously operated across the lake outlet.

The ferry service was established following a drowning in 1850. The ferry operator established the Lake Ferry hotel in 1851 to supplement his income.

The ocean outlet of Lake Ōnoke is frequently closed by natural wave action on the beach, and this can lead to rising water levels in the lake. Natural forces can lead to the opening of the lake outlet, but historically, the lake levels have been controlled by excavating a channel through the beach to the sea, to limit flooding of properties around the lake.

The outlet of Lake Ōnoke is known as a dangerous location for fishing, and there have been several drownings.

In 1997, local ratepayers requested that the South Wairarapa District Council investigate the provision of a community sewerage system, to avoid problems being experienced with contamination caused by septic tanks. A commitment was finally made in 2003, after central government agreed to contribute $200,000 towards the costs. In July 2020, the wastewater system that was built to serve the settlement was damaged during forestry operations, and residents were required to restrict wastewater for two days. The system uses discharge to a field. No discharge to waterways was reported. The estimated cost of repairs was $327,000.

In June 2023, the South Wairarapa District Council purchased the Lake Ferry campground from the previous lease-holder who had managed the holiday park since 2002. The council had declined to renew a campground licence because of claimed non-compliances with regulations, and then declined to renew the lease. A new operator, Kiwicamp, was engaged to take over for a 12 month term. The council budgeted $209,000 to upgrade the holiday park and address existing non-compliances.

== Gallery ==
Lake Ferry

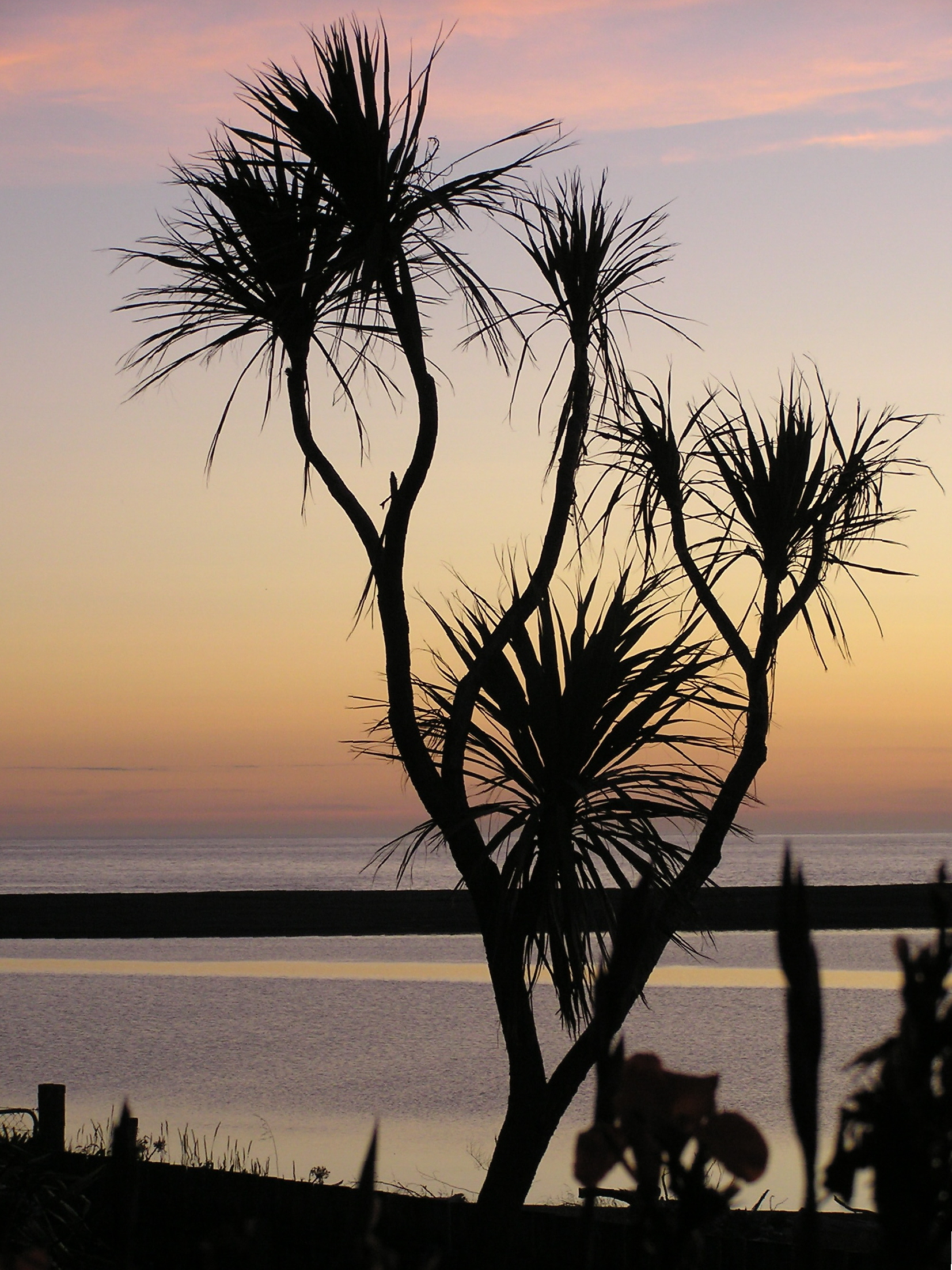
Ti kouka at Lake Ferry

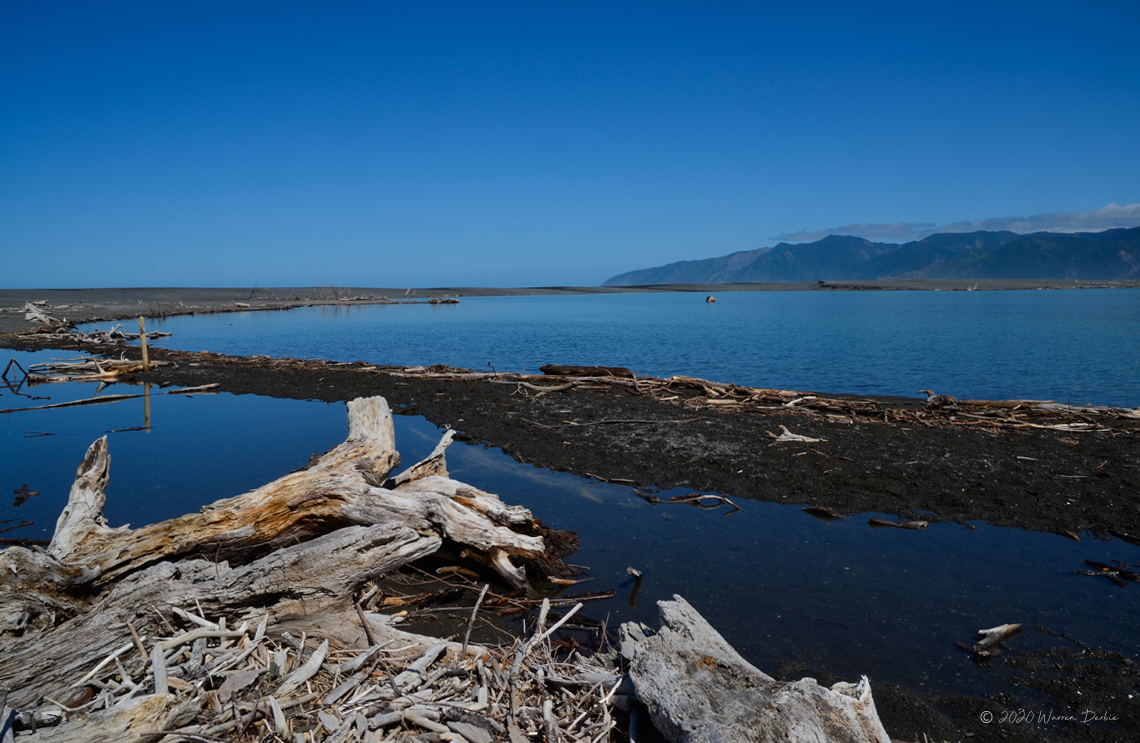
View across Lake Onoke to Remutaka range

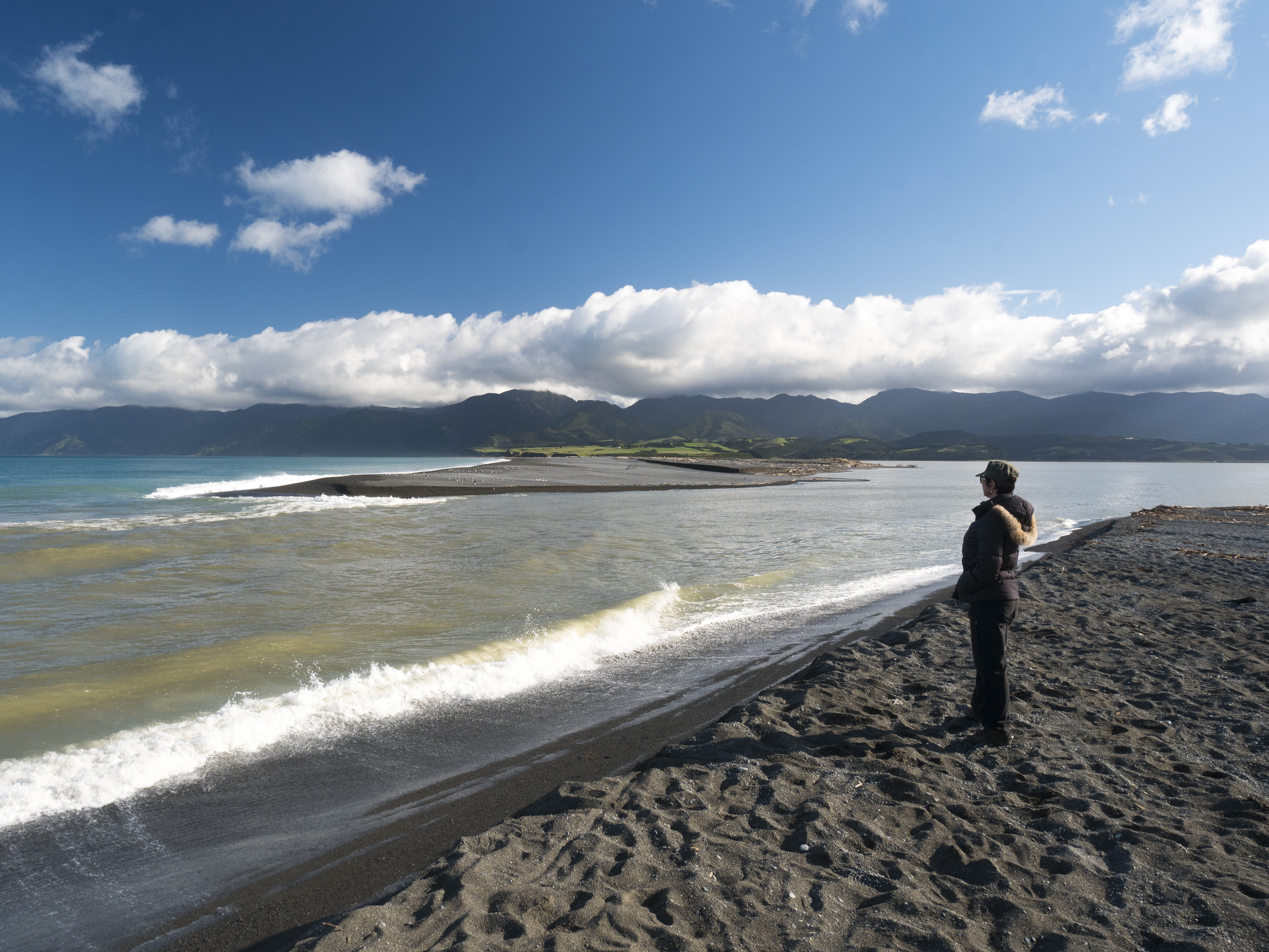
Open outlet of Lake Onoke

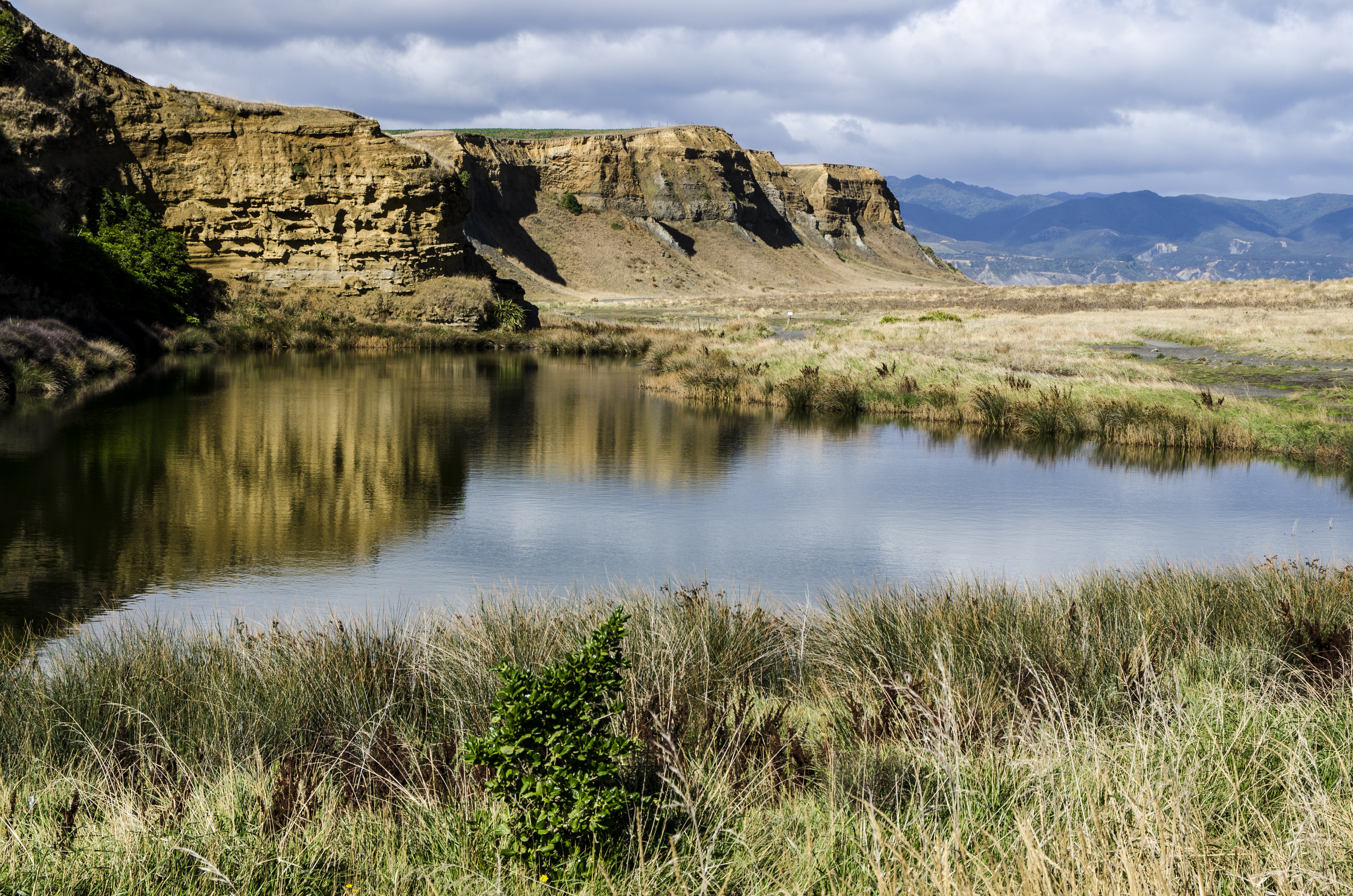
Cliffs and lagoon at Lake Ferry

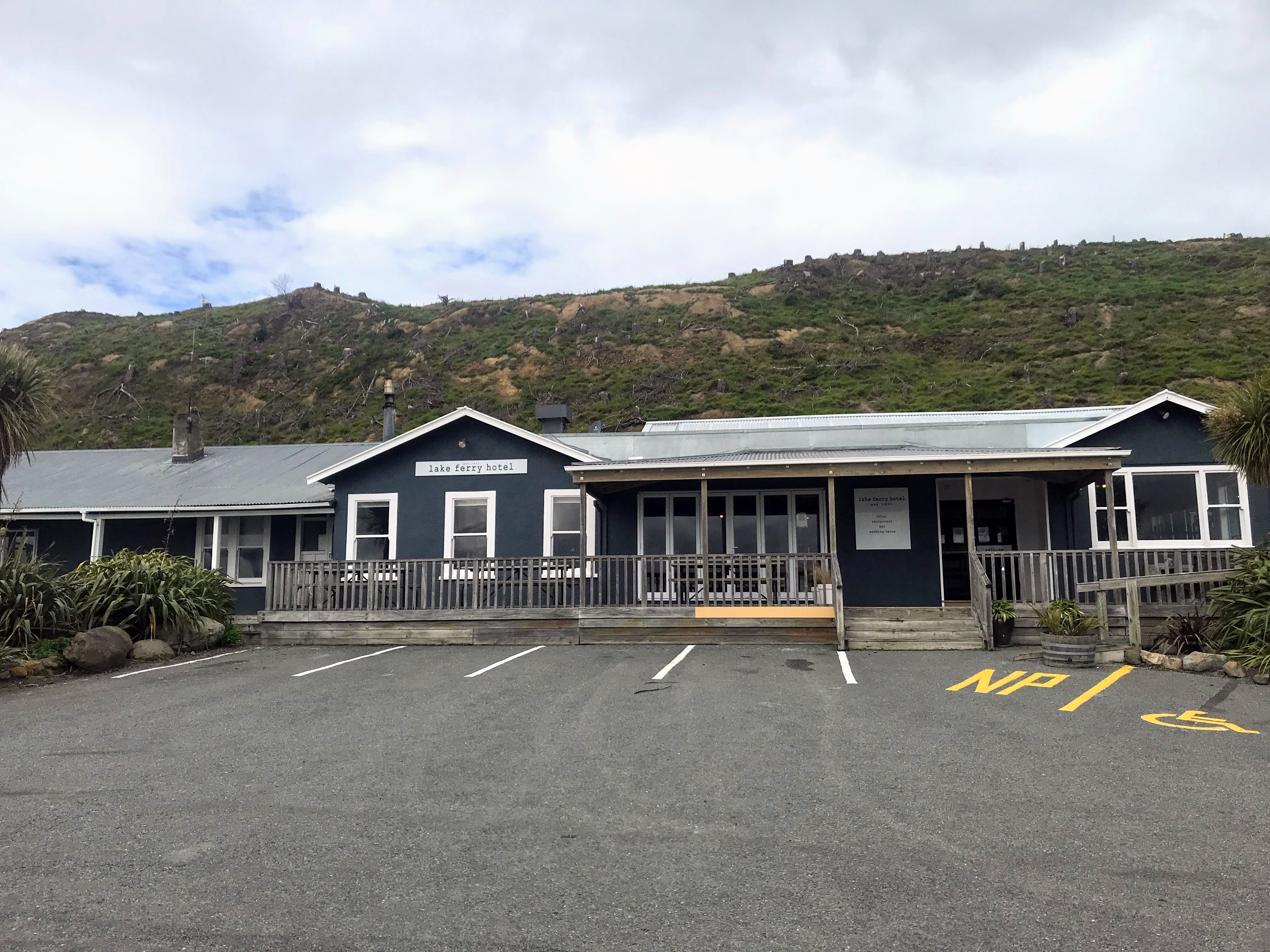
Lake Ferry hotel

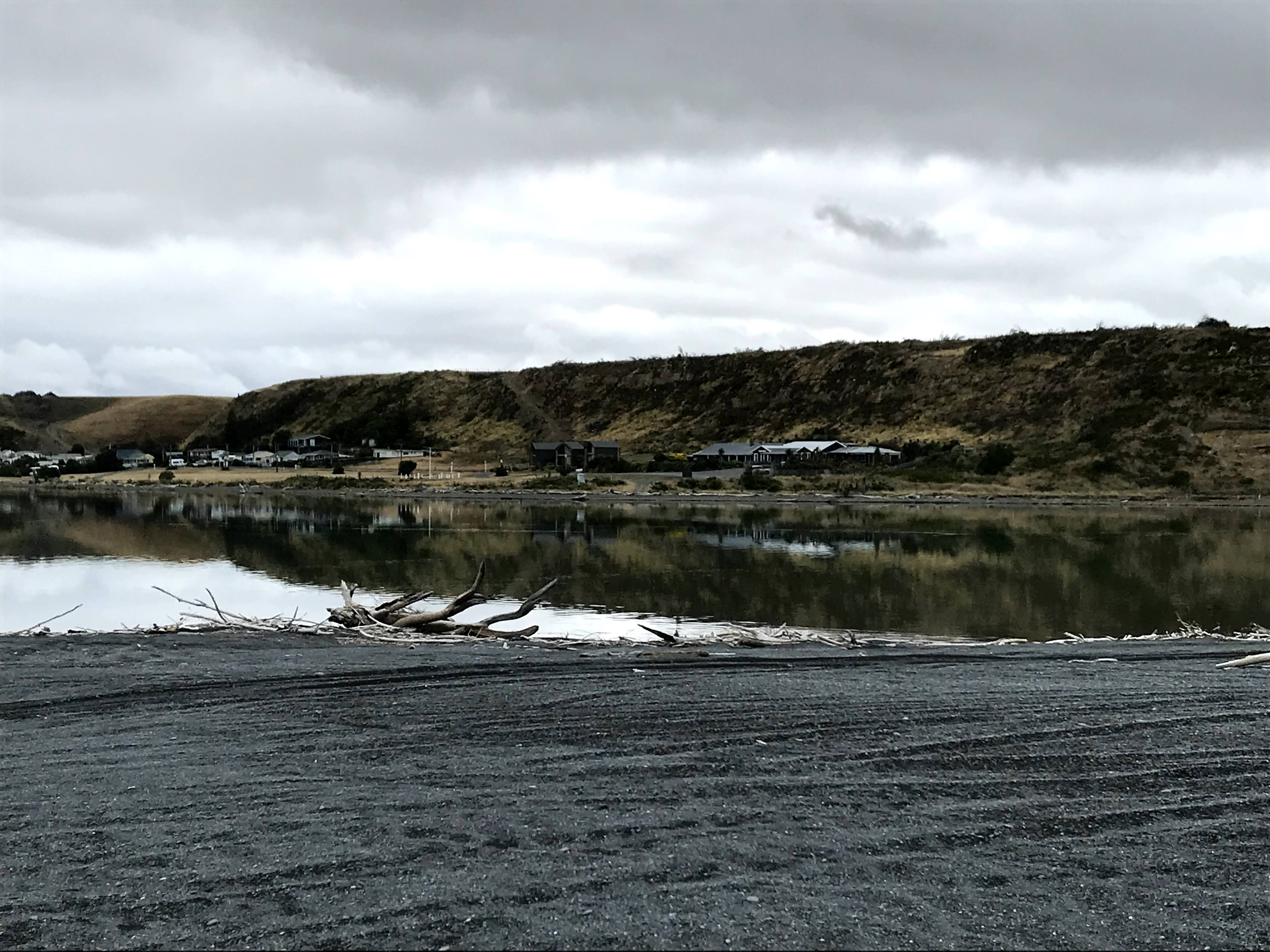
Lake Ferry hotel and village from beach
