= Te Hiko Pīata Tama-i-hikoia =

Te Hiko Pīata Tama-i-hikoia (?–1881) was a Māori tribal leader from the Wairarapa region in New Zealand. He identified with the Ngāti Kahungunu, Rangitāne and Ngāti Ira iwi. From the 1820s his people in the Wairarapa were attacked by tribes that had migrated from Taranaki and in the 1830s they took refuge at Nukutaurua on Māhia Peninsula. By about 1842 they had returned to the Wairarapa.
