= Mayor of Carterton =

- Common seal of the Carterton District Council

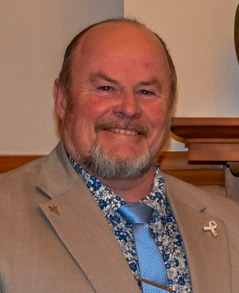
- Incumbent; Steve Cretney since 2025
- Style: His/Her Worship
- Term length: Three years
- Inaugural holder: Richard Fairbrother
- Formation: 1887; 139 years ago
- Deputy: Grace Ayling
- Salary: $100,365
- Website: Official website

The mayor of Carterton is the mayor of the Carterton District, which is administered by Carterton District Council, and earlier the office oversaw the Carterton Borough from 1887 until 1989, when Carterton Borough and Wairarapa South County were amalgamated to form Carterton District.

The current mayor of Carterton is Steve Cretney who was elected in 2025.

Georgina Beyer, New Zealand's first transgender mayor, held the office from 1995 to 1999.

== List of mayors ==
	Name	Portrait	Term
Mayor of Carterton Borough
1	Richard Fairbrother		1887–1891
2	Alfred Booth		1891–1892
3	George Deller		1892–1901
4	James Baillie		1901–1904
5	George Augustus Fairbrother		1904–1905
6	James Brown		1905–1907
7	Willie Moore		1907–1909
8	Adam Armstrong		1909–1910
9	J. A. Dudson		1910–1911
10	Frank Feist		1911–1914
11	M. D. Hornsby		1914–1915
12	J. T. Marryat Hornsby		1916–1917
13	Gordon Hughan		1917–1919
14	William Howard Booth		1919–1923
15	William Fisher		1923–1936
16	D. L. Taverner		1936–1947
17	Ron Wakelin		1947–1971
18	W. P. Chisholm		1971–1984
19	Barry Keys		1984–1989
Mayor of Carterton District
19	Barry Keys		1989–1995
20	Georgina Beyer		1995–2000
–	Brian Cameron (acting) (Note: Georgina Beyer stepped down as mayor upon her election as a member of the New Zealand Parliament for Wairarapa, resulting in deputy mayor Brian Cameron's appointment as acting mayor and the vacancy of the deputy mayor position.)		2000
21	Martin Tankersley		2000–2004
22	Gary McPhee		2004–2010
23	Ron Mark		2010–2014
–	John Booth (acting) (Note: Ron Mark stepped down as mayor of Carterton upon his election as a member of the New Zealand Parliament in the 2014 general election. This resulted in deputy mayor John Booth's appointment as acting mayor, with the deputy mayor position becoming vacant during this time.)		2014
24	John Booth		2014–2019
25	Greg Lang		2019–2022
(23)	Ron Mark		2022–2025
26	Steve Cretney		2025–present

== List of deputy mayors ==
Name	Term	Mayor
Deputy mayor of Carterton Borough
Adam Armstrong	c. July 1906–c. August 1906	Brown
William Fisher	1921–1923	Booth
Gordon Hughan	1923–c. 1930	Fisher
Unknown	c. 1930–c. 1934	Fisher
D. L. Taverner	fl.1934–1936	Fisher
W. CM. Sorensen (Note: There are conflicting reports about the spelling of Sorensen's surname, whether it be Sorensen or Sorenson. However, his obituary notes his surname as Sorensen, therefore, this is what he is referred to as in this article.)	1936–1938	Taverner
Edward McKenzie	1938–1944	Taverner
Herbert Mortenson	1944–1950	Taverner
Herbert Mortenson	1944–1950	Taverner Wakelin
C. J. Churchouse	1950–?	Wakelin
Unknown	c. 1950–1988	–
Eion Clarke	fl.1988	Keys
Deputy mayor of Carterton District
Neil Wilson Monk	1989–?	Keys
Unknown	c. 1989–c. 2000	–
Brian Cameron	?–2000	Beyer
Position vacant (April 2000)		Cameron (acting)
Richard Booth	?–2004	Tankersley
Bill Knowles	2004–2007	McPhee
Ruth Carter	2007–2010	McPhee
Elaine Brazendale	2010–2013	Mark
John Booth	2013–2014	Mark
Position vacant (September–October 2014)		Booth (acting)
Elaine Brazendale	2014–2016	Booth
Russell Keys	2016–2019	Booth
Rebecca Vergunst	2019–2022	Lang
Dale Williams	2022–2024	Mark
Steve Cretney	2024–2025	Mark
Grace Ayling	2025–present	Cretney
