= List of historic places in Carterton District =

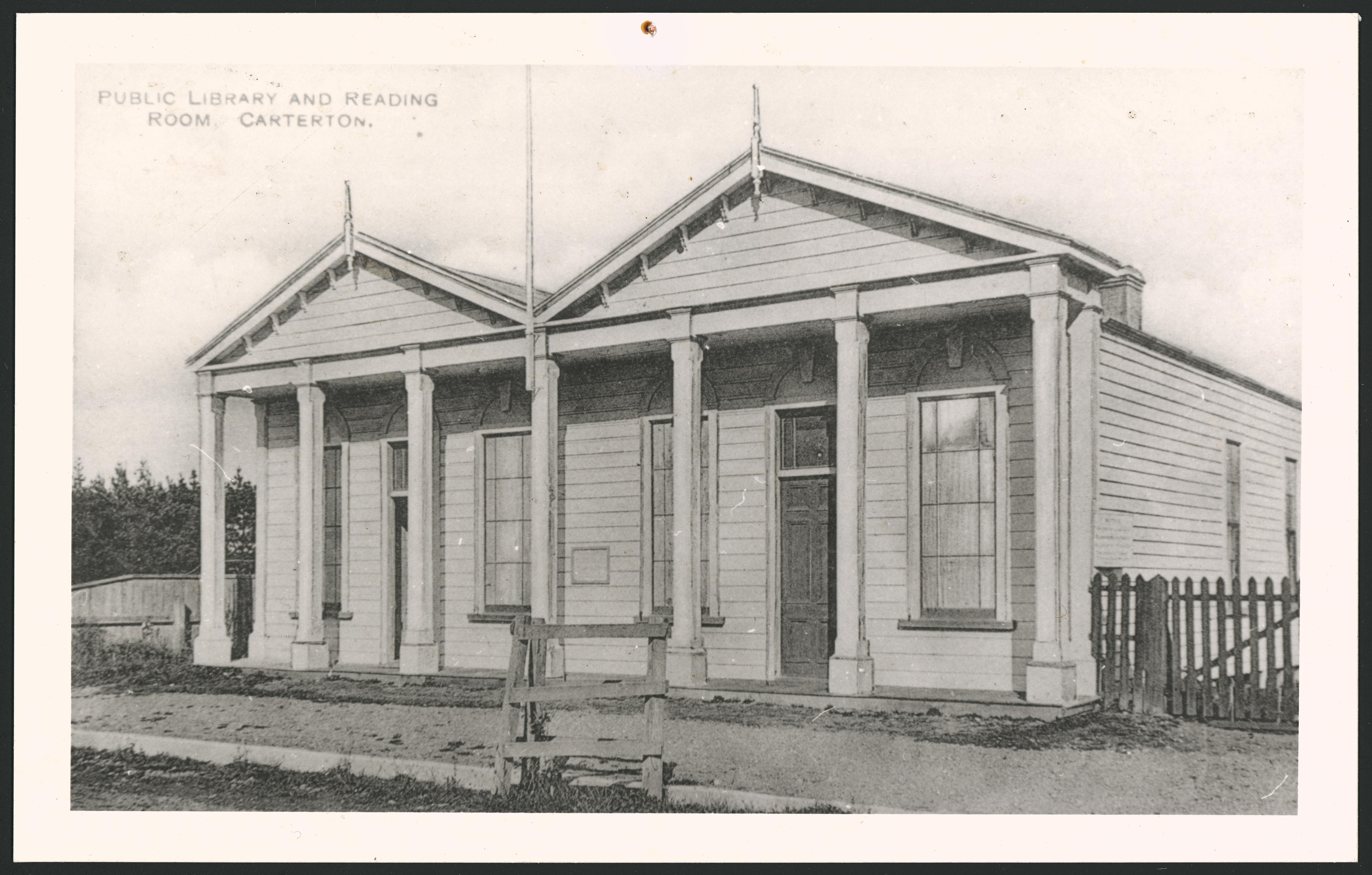
The Carterton Public Library, a Category 2 historic place in Carterton

The Carterton District is a territorial authority of the Wellington Region on the North Island of New Zealand. Part of the Wairarapa, the town of Carterton was established in 1857 by European settlers building a road in the region. Its principal early industries were farming, dairying, and timber milling. Sheep farming is extensive throughout the district, especially on the outlying hills. The town has emerged as a tourism centre, attracting visitors to the surrounding wineries and daffodil fields.

Heritage New Zealand classification of sites on the New Zealand Heritage List / Rārangi Kōrero, in accordance with the Heritage New Zealand Pouhere Taonga Act 2014, distinguishes between Category 1 ("places of special or outstanding historical or cultural significance") and Category 2 ("places of historic or cultural significance") sites, as well as historic areas (including multiple related places). Some sites important to Māori communities are given special classifications, although none of these sites are located within Carterton District itself. A total of sixteen listed sites are located in Carterton District, including three Category 1 sites and twelve Category 2 sites.

== List ==
List of historic places in Carterton district
Name	Classification	Location	Constructed	Registered	List number	Notes	Image	Ref(s)
Kourarau Hydroelectric Power Scheme	Category 2	Te Wharau Road, Gladstone	1923–1925	2011	7814	The first publicly owned hydroelectric power facility in the Wairarapa, it was engineered by Henry Keenan and Harry Climie. It continues to be used, with upgrades done in 2010.		
Waikēkeno Historic Area	Historic Area	Glenburn Road, Waimoana Station	-	2006	7669	A coastal Māori archaeological and cultural site with ties to the Ngāti Māhu hapū of the Ngāti Kahungunu iwi. It contains the remains of a papakainga which was occupied until the 1940s, as well as gardens, an urupā (burial site), and the Pukehuiake pā.		
Wakelin's Flourmill	Category 1	147 High Street South, Carterton	1875	2005	7664	A four-storey timber and corrugated steel flourmill constructed for miller Edward Louth Wakelin in 1875. Closed in 1964, community opposition to a proposed demolition in 1996 saved the mill building.	A rectangular four storey building on a street	
Carter Home (former)	Category 1	84 Moreton Road, Parkvale	1900–1901	2006	7663	A men's retirement home designed by William Crichton and Joseph Roe through the bequest of Charles Carter. The home was closed in 1964, and was for a decade the home of designer William Mason.		
Sayer's Slab Whare	Category 1	Arcus Road, Carterton	1859–1860	1998	7492	A simple wooden house built by fourteen-year-old hunter Richard Sayer, who remained in the area due to his friendship with Ngātuere Tāwhirimātea Tāwhao.		
Mayfield Station Shed	Category 2	Bristol Road, near East Taratahi	-	1983	7164	Shares the site with Mayfield Station Stables (#7163) and Mayfield Station Woolshed (#1291)		
Mayfield Station Stables	Category 2	Bristol Road, near East Taratahi	-	1983	7163	Shares the site with Mayfield Station Shed (#7164) and Mayfield Station Woolshed (#1291)		
Memorial Square and War Memorial	Category 2	High Street North, Memorial Square and Park Road, Carterton	1920	2020	3964	A First World War memorial designed by landscape architect Alfred William Buxton and erected in 1920. It features a broken pillar and memorial plinth, both in red granite, bearing the names of 114 local soldiers who died in the war. In 1949, a black granite base was added featuring the names of soldiers who died in the Second World War.		
Band Rotunda	Category 2	Carrington Park, High Street, Carterton	1911–1912	2020	3962	An octagonal rotunda in late Edwardian style built to commemorate the coronation of George V.		
Glendower Station Woolshed	Category 2	1169C Ponatahi Road, Ponatahi	c. 19th century	1983	2863	A traditional woolshed built at an unknown point, likely in the 19th century. The interior features the names and signatures of hundreds of workers, dating back to at least 1902, stencilled or written on the walls.		
Carrington House	Category 2	High Street North and Andersons Line, Carterton	1874	1983	2862	A large Victorian house built for settler William Booth in 1874. In 1894, it was moved back from the road using traction engines.		
St Mark's Church (Anglican)	Category 2	High Street South, Carterton	1875	1983	1293	A wooden Gothic Revival church built in 1875. It features stained glass windows donated by town namesake Charles Carter in memory of his daughter.	A photograph of a church with a tall spire in a grassy environment	
Public Library	Category 2	50 Holloway Street, Carterton	1881	1983	1292	A library built in 1881 for the town's library system, which was established in 1874. It is the oldest purpose-built library building still in use in New Zealand.	A photo of a brown one-storey public library building	
Mayfield Station Woolshed	Category 2	Bristol Road, near East Taratahi	-	1983	1291	Shares the site with Mayfield Station Shed (#7164) and Mayfield Station Stables (#7163)		
Glendower Station Homestead	Category 2	1169A Ponatahi Road, Ponatahi	c. 1864	1983	1290	A homestead originally built by John Milsome Jury c. 1864. Major restorations and expansions were made in 1935, which attempted to maintain its traditional appearance. The homestead was sold by the Jury family in 2016.		
Fairburn Station Stables	Category 2	271 Perrys Road and 250 East Taratahi Road, East Taratahi	before 1860s	1983	1289	The stables of a sheep run established sometime before the 1860s		
