= Hamuera Tamahau Mahupuku =

New Zealand Māori tribal leader (c.1842–1904)

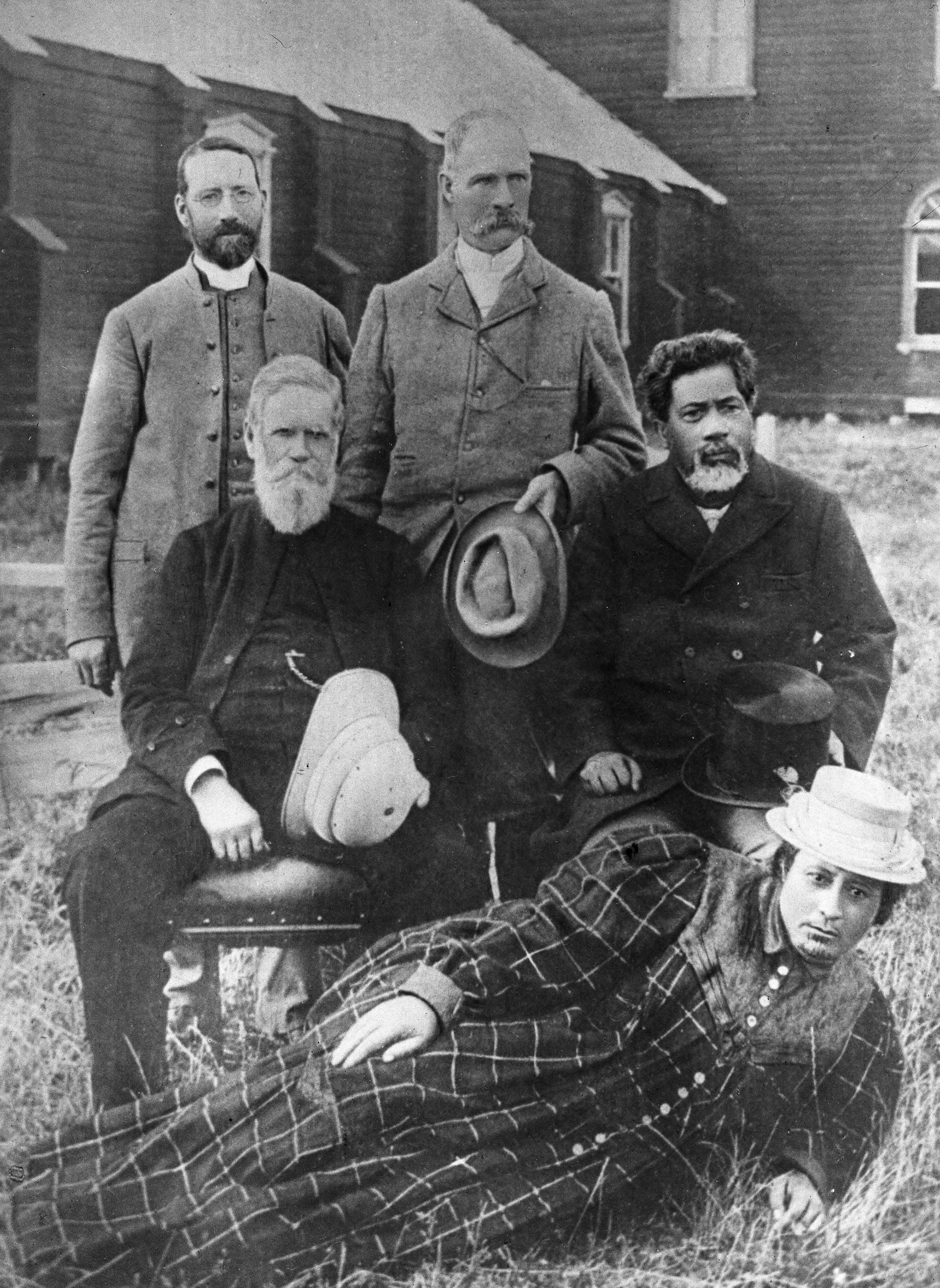
Mahupuku (seated, right) with Canon Samuel Williams (seated, left) and group at Papawai

Hamuera Tamahau Mahupuku (c.1842 – 14 January 1904) was a New Zealand tribal leader, runholder, assessor and newspaper proprietor. Of Māori descent, he identified with the Ngāti Kahungunu iwi. He was born in the Wairarapa, New Zealand (either at Rangataua, near Longbush, or at Pahaoamy) in c.1842.

== Early life ==
The exact location and date of Tamahau's birth is uncertain. A monument to him at Pāpāwai states that he was born on 25 September 1840, but the Dictionary of New Zealand Biography (DNZB) notes that some sources record his birth as being in either 1837 or 1842. The DNZB goes on to state that his birth location could have been either Rangataua or Pāhaoa. His father was Mahupuku, a descendant of Kahungunu, and his mother was Haumai-te-rangi. He had an older brother. At some point in his childhood he was baptised by a missionary of the Church Missionary Society, possibly William Colenso, and was comfortable living and working alongside Europeans. Despite his comfort alongside Europeans, he, along with his brother, was a supporter of the Māori King movement.

== Time at Pāpāwai ==
Tamahau worked as an assessor in the Native Land Court, dealing with claims related to Lake Wairarapa. His second wife, Raukura, provided him a link to Pāpāwai, as Raukura's first husband held significant influence there. He was eventually afforded a position there by Te Mānihera Te Rangi-taka-i-waho and, upon Te Mānihera's death in 1885, began leading meetings. In 1891, Tamahau's brother died and Tamahau inherited his wealth, establishing Pāpāwai as a significant centre for the Māori community.

Beginning in 1893, Tamahau took part in Te Kotahitanga meetings but was not entirely supportive, stating a suspicion in attempts to give the Kotahitanga government control of traditional lands. He led meetings of the government at Pāpāwai in 1897 and oversaw the construction of a new building capable of hosting 1,000 people for those meetings, the opening of which was attending by Lord Ranfurly, then-governor of New Zealand. Shortly thereafter, in 1898, Tamahau hosted a meeting to discuss Prime Minister Richard Seddon's attempts to establish further control over Māori lands. Unlike many participants in the meeting, Tamahau wished to engage with the government and proposed several amendments to the plan that would grant Māori a voice in the process.

Tamahau was involved in both political and community organizing, first proposing a newspaper targeted at the Māori community in 1894. The newspaper, Te Puke ki Hikurangi, was launched on 21 December 1897 with Pūrākau Maika as editor. Between this project and other business ventures, Tamahau was estimated to have spent close to £50,000 to promote the Māori people. He was also chosen to represent Māori people at the inauguration of the Australian Commonwealth.

== Personal life ==
Tamahau had three wives: Wairata, Raukura, and Clara. He did not have any biological children but did have an adopted daughter, Aketū Piripi, who died at 17. Tamahau died on 14 January 1904, with his estate being left to his great-niece Maata Mahupuku. After his death, a monument was constructed at Pāpāwai, which was rebuilt in the 1980s.
