= Mangakahia (surname) =

Mangakahia is a surname. Notable people with this surname include:

- Hāmiora Mangakāhia (1838–1918), Maori chief
- Mabel Mangakāhia (1899–1940), New Zealand district nurse
- Meri Mangakāhia (1868–1920), New Zealand activist
- Tiana Mangakahia (1995–2025), Australian basketball player
