= Hoani Te Whatahoro Jury =

Ngati Kahungunu scholar, recorder, interpreter (1841–1923)

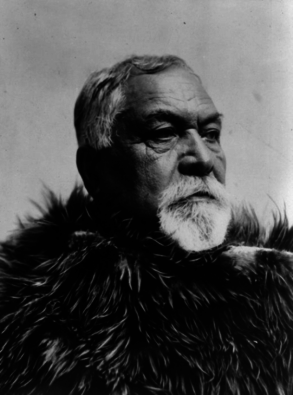
- Jury in c. 1900–1920

Member of Te Kotahitanga (Māori Parliament)
- In office June 1892 – 1902

1st chairman of Te Kotahitanga (Māori Parliament)
- In office June 1892 – July 1892
- Preceded by: Position established
- Succeeded by: Hōne Taare Tīkao

2nd premier of Te Kotahitanga (Māori Parliament)
- In office 1893–1894
- Preceded by: Hāmiora Mangakāhia
- Succeeded by: Hāmiora Mangakāhia

Personal details
- Born: 4 February 1841 Wairarapa, New Zealand
- Died: 26 September 1923 (aged 82) Greytown, New Zealand
- Resting place: Greytown (Papawai) Māori Cemetery
- Spouse(s): Pane Ihaka Te Moe Whatarau; Hera Ihaka Te Moe Whatarau; Huhana Apiata; Keriana Te Potae-aute; Mata Pohoua; Hera Erena Rongo; Hera Ferris
- Children: 15
- Parent(s): Te Aitu-o-te-rangi Jury; John Milsome Jury
- Occupation: Academic, politician

Hoani Turi Te Whatahoro Jury (4 February 1841 – 26 September 1923) was a New Zealand Ngāti Kahungunu scholar, recorder and interpreter. He was born in Wairarapa, New Zealand, on 4 February 1841. His mother was Te Aitu-o-te-rangi Jury and his father John Milsome Jury, an Englishman.

In 1892 he was elected chairman of Te Kotahitanga, the movement for an autonomous Māori parliament, at its first meeting at Waipatu. At the second sitting of Te Kotahitanga in 1893 he was elected premier. His premiership was mired by accusations of financial mismanagement made by his predecessor and successor, Hāmiora Mangakāhia.

== Works ==
Jury's book, The Lore of the Whare-Wananga, published in 1913, was selected for inclusion in Books of Mana as one of the 180 most significant works of Māori-authored non-fiction.
