= Mangakahia =

Mangakahia can refer to:

- Mangakahia River, a river in New Zealand
- Mangakahia-Hūkerenui, a statistical region in New Zealand
- Mangakahia (surname)
