= Tangatahara =

Māori warrior (1772–1847)

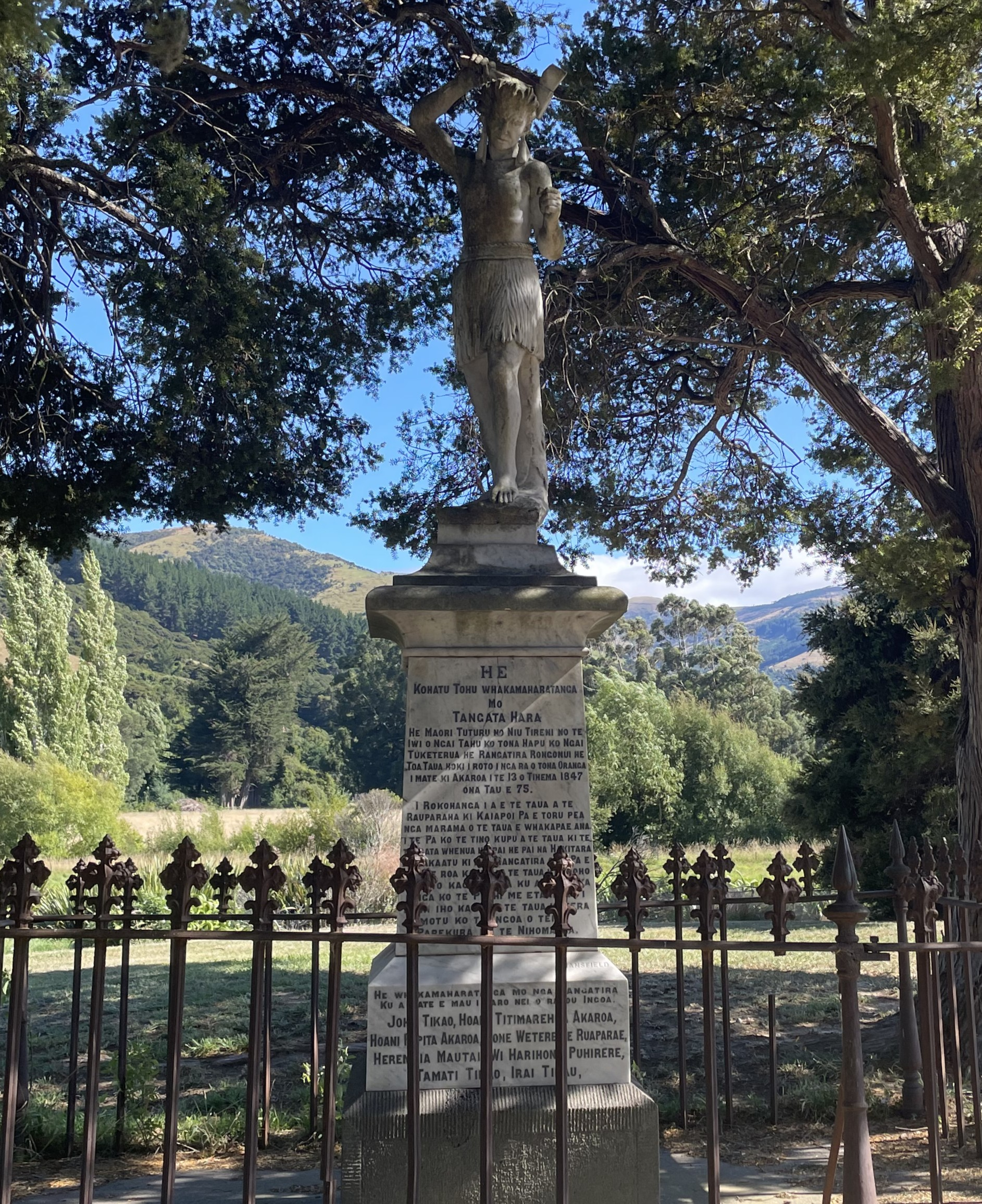
- A statue in memory of Tangatahara at Little River, unveiled 22 March 1900
- Born: 1771 or 1772
- Died: 13 December 1847 (aged 75); Akaroa, New Zealand
- Resting place: Ōtūtereinga
- Other name: Ugly Man
- Known for: Commander of unsuccessful 1832 defence of Ōnawe Pā

Tangatahara (c. 1772 – 13 December 1847) was a Ngāti Irakehu (Banks Peninsula) and Ngāi Tūāhuriri warrior who led the unsuccessful defence of the Ōnawe Pā invasion in 1832, but later restored his prestige by joining war parties to drive Te Rauparaha and his forces from Te Wai Pounamu.

== Early life ==
Tangatahara (Note: Occasionally written Tāngatahara, but 'tāngata' means 'men' (plural), not 'man'.) (pronounced Takata Hara in Southern Māori dialect, also spelt Tangata Hara) lived at Kaiapoi Pā and on the western side of Akaroa Harbour, on Banks Peninsula. 'Tangata' means 'man' and 'hara' can mean 'offence' or 'foul'; in other words, his name denotes a criminal or ugly man.

Ngāi Tahu, originally a lower North Island tribe, had moved steadily south into Ngāti Mamoe territory, settling where people were already settled, conquering and intermingling, until the Ngāti Mamoe lost their identity as a separate people. In the early 19th century, the Kaiapoi and Banks Peninsula hapū were divided against each another, and many were killed in the Kai Huānga ('consuming relatives') feud. But they had to put their differences aside to face a new threat when the Ngāti Toa war chief Te Rauparaha began a series of raids on the South Island.

Thus, Tangatahara lived in a time of violent conflicts within and between tribes, along with the misunderstandings and minor conflicts of the early decades of contact with Europeans. Ngāi Tahu people would always have been on guard. Spring ushered in the fighting season. Winter was the time to withdraw, to family life, to make repairs and recuperate. When the earth sprouted, it was time to ready your weapons.

Tangatahara first encountered Te Rauparaha at Kaiapoi Pā at the end of 1828 or beginning of 1829. He and Akaroa's high chief,Tama-i-hara-nui, ambushed and killed eight of Te Rauparaha's rangatira (chiefs) in a pre-emptive strike. The northerners had arrived at the pā giving assurances of friendly feelings towards the inhabitants. However, words had arrived via fugitives from a skirmish at Omihi of slaughter and foul play by Te Rauparaha's followers. The leaders of the pā convened a hurried meeting and decided unanimously to strike the first blow. Te Pēhi Kupe, a senior Ngāti Toa rangatira (chief), saw what was happening and scrambled to escape.

Several shots were fired at him Te Pehi without effect, and he would probably have succeeded in making his escape, but for Tangatahara, a man of great bodily strength, and a courageous warrior who grappled with him and succeeded in dispatching him with a hatchet. (Note: James Stack was a missionary. He wrote about what high authority Kaiapoi and Banks Peninsula Ngā Tahu told him of their oral history; however, historian Harry Evison suggests Stack was strongly influenced by Ngāti Toa Tāmihana Te Rauparaha, with whom he spent a lot of time, including a ship voyage from London.)

— James West Stack, Kaiapohia: The Story of a Siege, page 24

In all, eight northern chiefs were dispatched in a terrible and surprising blow to Te Rauparaha. He had never imagined that the Ngāi Tūāhuriri would dare to take such an initiative. He made a speedy retreat and fled back to his stronghold on Kapiti Island, bearing a grudge.

The killings, particularly of Te Pēhi Kupe, triggered a war. Two years later Te Rauparaha returned, and in a bold and novel ruse, now known as the Takapūneke massacre, he captured Tama-i-hara-nui. (The whereabouts of Tangatahara on that day is not documented).

… Tamaiharanui was handed over to the widow on Te Pehi, who put him death to by slow and nameless tortures. Base, as the mean adopted for his capture were, in cruel as his fate was, it is impossible to feel much pity for Tamaiharanui. His punishment was hardly more than he deserved the treatment he received at the hands of the Ngatitoa was little more than a repetition of the cruelties which he himself inflicted on members of his own tribe… however much his people may have mourned the manner of his death, they could not fail to experience a sense of relief when he was gone.

— James West Stack, Kaiapohia: the story of a siege, pages 27–28

== Ōnawe ==
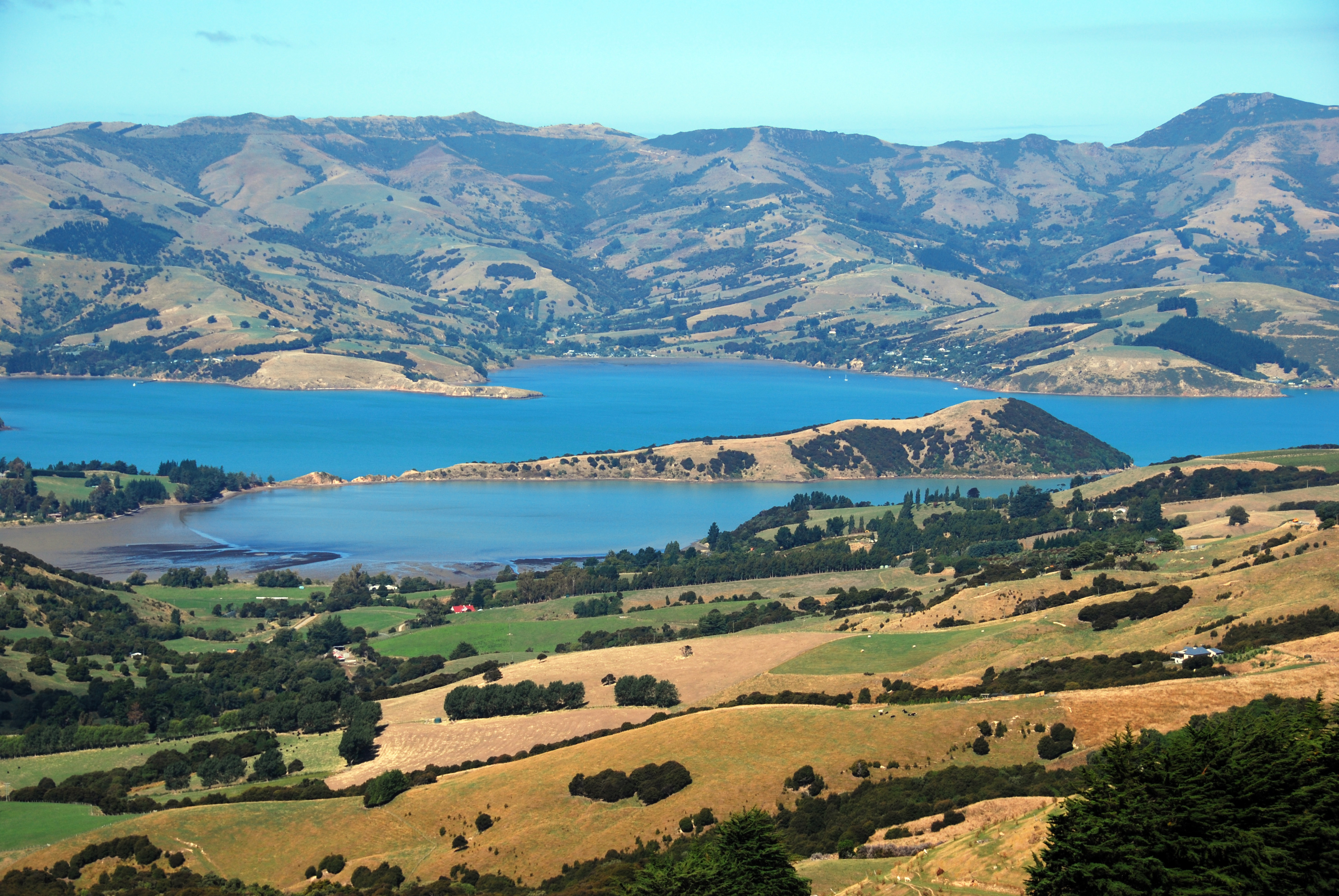
Ōnawe Peninsula

Fearing Te Rauparaha would return after he had captured Tama-i-hara-nui and sacked Takapūneke, the Akaroa Harbour Māori built a pā (fortification) on the landward slope of Ōnawe Peninsula. (Its attractiveness as a defensive position in the warfare of the period is indicated by the fact that the French in 1838 gave Ōnawe the name of 'Mount Gibraltar'. Yet in fact it was a deadly trap.)

Tangatahara, at age 60, was commander of the defences at the pā. Great quantities of food were stored within the pā, and the defenders dragged waka (canoe) into the pā and filled them with water, in case access to the springs was cut off. About 400 warriors and a larger number of woman and children gathered.

When Te Rauparaha did return in the summer of 1831–32, he captured the stronghold at Kaiapoi Pā, then carried on to the Ōnawe fortress, intent killing Tama-i-hara-nui's kinsmen. Using a party of captives from Kaiapoi as a screen, panic ensued, and he took the pā where there was further slaughter.

There were only eight firearms in this pa, and yet, Te Rauparaha was afraid to take it by assault, and so made up his mind to take it by treachery. Of the eight guns, two belonged to the chief Whareki, one being an old, big-mouthed blunderbuss and the other a flint-fire. Momo, a brother of Te Maiharanui, had been taken prisoner, and was shoved forward with other prisoners to say there would be no killing by the Northerners. While this act of taware (cajolery: duplicity) was going on some of Rauparaha’s men had sneaked into the pa and began killing the inhabitants. Some of these had desired no parlay with the foe, as they suspected deceit, and these had trained the eight guns on selected marks among the Kata-Toa. When the murder began, they fired, and seven bullets found their mark, but the eighth one intended for Rauparaha, unfortunately missed through the barrel being knocked to one side.

— Hōne Taare Tīkao, Tikao Talks: traditions and tales of the Canterbury Maori as told by Teone Taare Tikao to Herries Beattie, page 128

Tangatahara, as the leader, put up a fight at Ōnawe, in this forlorn stand. Few survived the day, only the young and strong were taken for slavery. Up to 1200 people were slain.

This catastrophe, which has puzzled historians ever since, suggests a surprising degree of incompetence, gullibility and indecision on the defender's part, as well as lingering suspicions and animosity from the Kai Huānga feud on the part of the prisoners.

Tangatahara himself was captured and was bound for slavery; however, on the way to Kapiti Island, when the waka (canoe) he was in stopped at Gough's Bay for repairs, he dove into the sea and fled into the bush. Canon Stack elaborates:

Rauparaha having accomplished his objective, gave his warrior’s permission to return to the north, and having received directions where to rendezvous on the coast, several war canoes put to see at once. The one commanded by Te Hiko (he was the son of Te Pehi which made his treatment of Tangatahara all the more noteworthy) Chief of the Ngatiawa contingent, not being quite sea-worthy was beached for repairs at Okauru (Gough’s Bay). Amongst the prisoners Te Hiko had with them was, or “ugly man”, so nicknamed many years before by a lady who resented his persistent attentions to her. He was a renowned warrior, and the late commander of the fortress of Onawe. He was particularly obnoxious to Rauparaha, since it was by his hand that the great Te Pehi fell at Kaiapoi. While Te Hiko was engaged repairing his canoe, a detachment of Rauparaha’s bodyguards who had been searching the neighbouring hills and forests for fugitives came upon the scene. They were accompanied by two woman, near relations of the great Chief, and who on recognising Tangatahara as the man for whom their family had a blood-feud, according to custom demanded his surrender, exclaiming “Light and oven, we must have a feast, here is our man!” Te Hiko resented this interference with his rights as captor of the noted prisoner, and refused to give him up, and to prevent his being molested placed a guard of his own men around him… The woman of the party were not, however, easily appeased and drawn from their purpose. They persisted for a long time in pressing their demand; but finding Te Hiko firm in his refusal, they begged since they might not kill the Ngai Tahu man to be allowed to strike his head with the kauru fibres they were chewing, and so degrade him by pretending to use his head as a relish for their kauru. This request was guaranteed, whereupon the two women went up to the prisoner who was seated on the ground in the midst of a group of Ngatiawa warriors, and struck him several times on the top of the head with the kauru, which they then proceeded to chew. Te Hiko was very much vexed by the disregard shown to his wishes by Rauparaha’s relatives, and made up his mind there and then to release Tangatahara as soon as they were gone. Accordingly during the night, he roused him, and told him he might escape, which he did very easily as the camp was situated on the edge of the forest, which then covered the greater part of Banks Peninsula.

— James West Stack, Kaiapohia: the story of a siege, pages 49–50

== Taua (war parties) ==
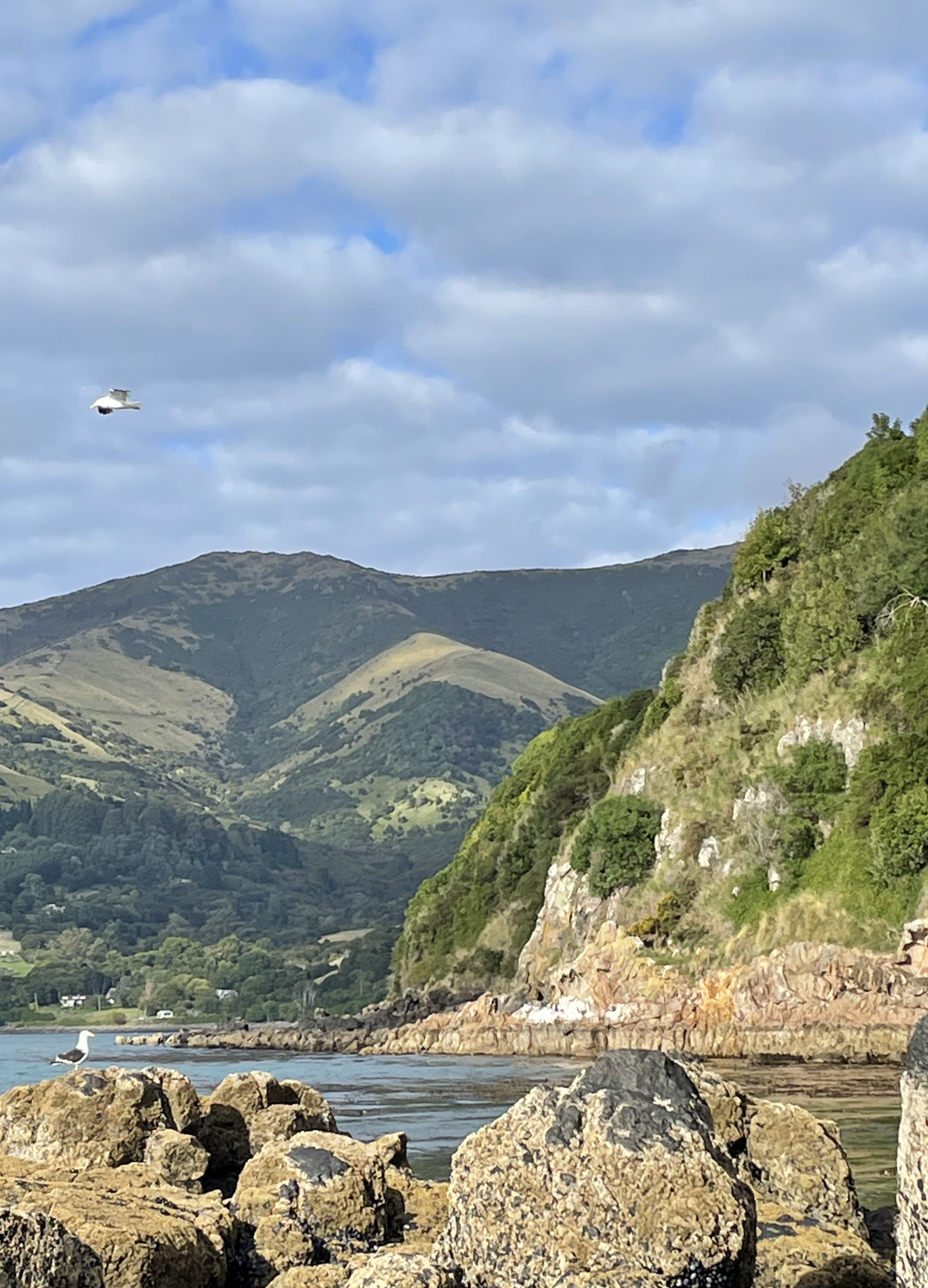
Ōtūtereinga (Ō Tū Te Reinga) is a point at the northern end of Wainui, Akaroa Harbour. It literally means "the flitting place from which spirits pass to the underworld"

After the massacre, Tangatahara redeemed himself though. He joined Taiaroa, an Otago rangatira, as one of the leaders of the Tauaiti (little war party) of 1833 and also of the Tauanui (big war party) in 1834, and went north to attack Te Rauparaha in the area of the Marlborough Sounds. No engagement eventuated.

To try to even things up the Southerners went up to Marlborough… but their well-meant intentions did not come off and Te Rauparaha again escaped by the skin of his teeth. They went up again once or twice more, but they never managed to kill that wily old fox.

— Hōne Taare Tīkao, Tikao Talks: traditions and tales of the Canterbury Maori as told by Teone Taare Tikao to Herries Beattie, page 128

When the British came calling at Akaroa with Te Tiriti, he (and other rangatira) from the western side of the harbour decided to avoid meeting them, or he was possibly living in Moeraki at the time.

He died on 13 December 1847 and is buried at an ancient urupā (burial ground) below the cliff at Ōtūtereinga.

== Recognition ==
A statue of Tangatahara was unveiled at Little River on 22 March 1900 by Hōri Kerei Taiaroa. Other distinguished guests were Tame Parata, Charles Tikao, T. Te Kahi, George (Teoti) Robinson and T. E. Green. Four hundred guests from all over the South Island attended the unveiling. The statue, carved in white marble by a French sculptor, depicts a cherub-faced warrior in action, wielding a hatchet. It is mounted on a pedestal, which is inscribed on four sides with the story of his exploits. It also upholds the memory of Banks Peninsula leaders, including Hōne Tikao. The statue stands on a mound beside the Wairewa marae.

The inscription is in Māori. A translation reads:

This statue is erected in memory of Tangata Hara, a native of New Zealand, of the Tuketerau [Tuketerua] clan of the Ngarahura [Ngai Tahu] tribe, a renowned warrior, died at Akaroa on Dec. 13th, 1847; aged 75 years. He was in Kaiapoi Pah on the arrival of Te Rauparaha’s first expedition, during their stay, probably about three months, pretending and professing peace. Haketara [Hakitara] warned the chiefs of the pah to be on their guard as treachery contemplated an attack on the pah. Shortly after this was verified, when Te Pehi and others were slain. The expedition then returned to the other island. This expedition is known by the name of Te Niho Maka. Subsequently the expedition returned to Akaroa on board a vessel commanded by Captain Stewart, when Te Mai Haranui was captured and taken prisoner by them and murdered. Te Rauparaha afterwards returned with his third expedition, composed of several tribes and clans to attack Kaiapoi. After its fall the expedition went to attack Onawe Pah. Tahatiti who went out of the pah to attack the enemy, was shot. Some of the Kaiapoi chiefs went into the pah to divert the attention of the defenders, while still tangi-ing with their friends, the enemy following in the rear. While seizing and making prisoners, those at the upper part of the pah opened out their fire with only eight muskets, and killed several of the enemy before they were captured. Te Rauparaha himself had a narrow escape from being shot, Tara having pushed the gun aimed at him by Te Puaka on one side. Tahatiti was the only one of the defenders killed. The expedition is known by the name Te Maha Taupoki. At the end of all these expeditions, the offensive was taken up by the Ngaitahu in 1832. The expedition of Ngaitahu reached Wairau and took up a position on the coast, where four canoes and a boat were seen approaching, which proved to be that of Te Rauparaha. The boat and two of the canoes landed, when Te Matata’s dog revealed to them the presence of Ngaitahu, who immediately attacked and defeated the enemy. Had all the canoes landed, the enemy would have been annihilated. The enemy were afterwards again attacked and defeated at Oraumou. Tangata Hara had a command in this expedition. This expedition is known as Tauaiti. Subsequently a second expedition of Ngaitahu went to Wairau, known as by the name Tauanui. Tangata Hara accompanied this expedition, Ngaitahu. After this, Tuhawaiki’s expedition, coming from the south, landed at Piraka, when they were advised by Europeans to return home to the south, but they had already slain Koko. On their return to the south, they attacked and defeated at Tuturau the Puaho's expedition, which had reached Tuturau. Te Puaho was slain, and his followers were taken prisoners. In 1837 peace was proclaimed between Ngaitahu and Te Rauparaha, which ended all strife between them, through the introduction of Christianity and in memory of the undermentioned chiefs: John Tikao, Hoani Titimarahua [Titimarehua], Hoani Papita, Hono Wetero Te Rauparae [Hone Wetere Te Ruaparae], Heremaia Mautai, Wi Harahoua Purihirere [Wi Harihona Puhirere], Tamati Tikao, Irai Tihau, Henare Wateus Tawha [Henare Watene Tawha], Wiremu Naerata Ao [Wiremu Naera Te Ao], Rawiri Te Ito, Hepa Paura [Hopa Paura], Henare Te Paro Tamakeke

— "Unveiling of the Maori memorial", Akaroa Mail and Banks Peninsula Advertiser, 23 March 1900

== Portraits ==
A life cast of a Tangatahara was made possibly at Moeraki, in Otago, on 31 March 1840. The cast is one of three tattooed warriors made by phrenologist Pierre-Marie Alexandre Dumoutier during D'Urville's exploratory Pacific voyage. A copy of it was presented to Akaroa Museum by the French Government in 1990, and it stands in a prominent position at the Akaroa Museum, although doubt has been raised as to whether it is him or a different Otago warrior named Taha-tahala. Another cast made at the same time is purportedly of Hōne Tikao.

A sketch titled "Tangatahara, King Akaroa" is one of four portraits drawn by French artist Auguste Jagerschmidt in 1841. He is depicted side on, slouching and dressed in a European suit and tie.
