= Te Keepa =

Te Keepa is a given name. Notable people with the given name include:

- Te Keepa Mewett, more commonly known as Keepa Mewett (born 1987), New Zealand rugby union player
- Te Keepa Pouwiuwhiu, more commonly known as Ernie Asher (1886–1973), New Zealand rugby union and rugby league player
- Te Keepa Te Rangihiwinui (died 1898), New Zealand Māori military commander
- Te Keepa Te Rangi-pūawhe (c. 1826–1905), New Zealand Māori tribal leader

== See also ==
- Alex Tarrant-Keepa, more commonly known as Alex Tarrant (born 1990 or 1991), New Zealand actor
