= Hōne Tikao =

New Zealand Māori kaumātua (elder)

John Love, Hōne Tikao Horomaka (Banks Peninsula) leader
- Piuraki
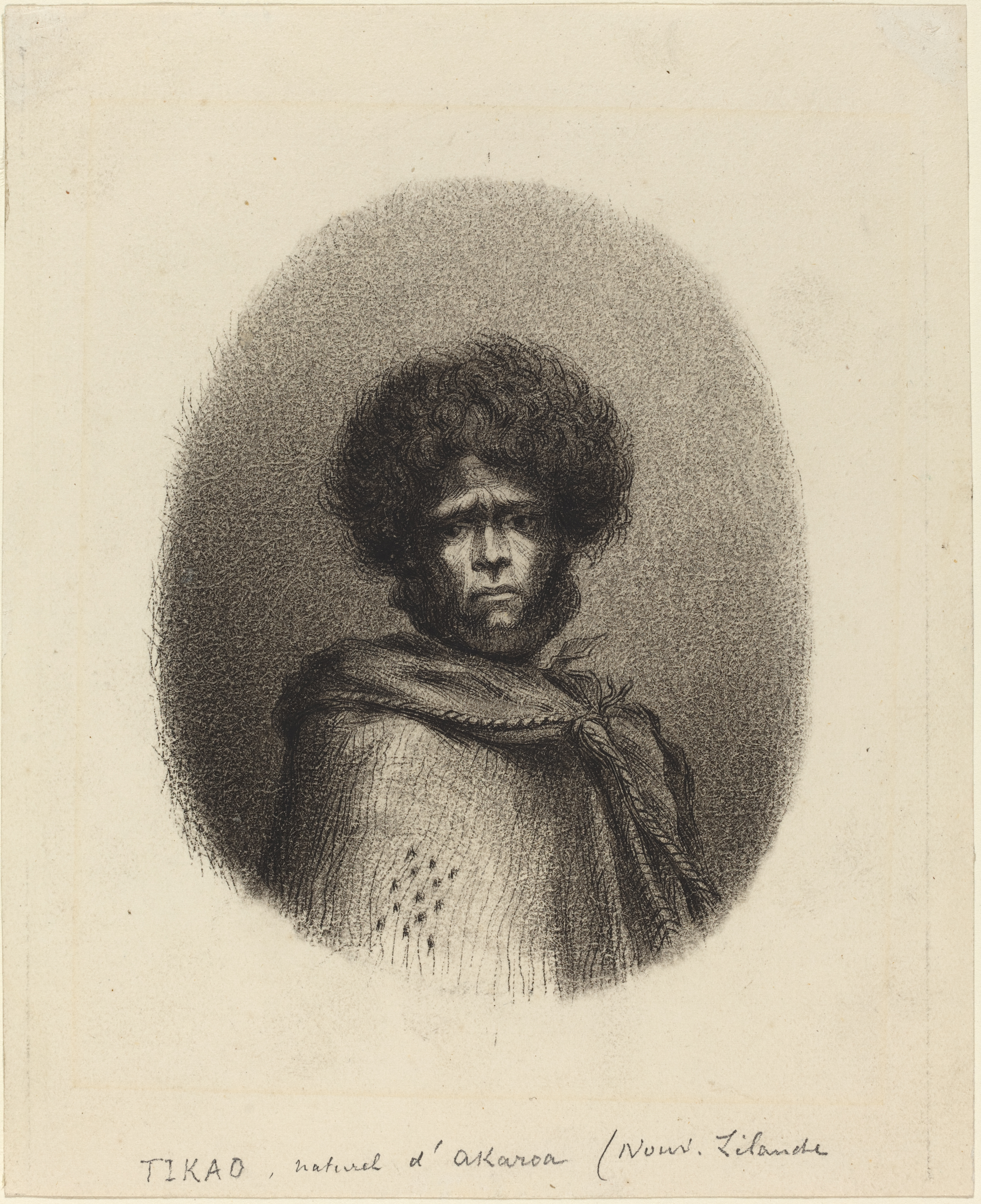
- Charles Meryon, Tikao, naturel d'Akaroa, NGA 9126
- Born: Hone Tikao; Akaroa Harbour, New Zealand
- Died: June 1852 (aged 43–44); Pigeon Bay, New Zealand
- Burial place: Kaiapoi
- Known for: enslaved by Te Rauparaha, signed Te Tiriti o Waitangi

Hōne Tikao (also known as Piuraki and John (Jack) Love (1808 – June 1852) was an Akaroa Harbour Ngāi Te Kahukura kaumātua (respected elder) of great physique, strength and intelligence. At age 22, he was captured and enslaved by the war chief Te Rauparaha for many years, and upon release had many whaling adventures, learning to speak English and French. He signed the Treaty of Waitangi in 1840, and Kemp's Deed in 1848, and became a prominent negotiator in the land sales and disputes that took place later.

He was tattooed on one side of his face in a curved design. Tikao Bay takes its name from him. Piuraki is his tribal name.

== Early life ==
Tikao was born around 1808 on the western shores of Akaroa Harbour. He was the son of the rangatira (chief) Tauporiotu and Hakeke, and is a descendant of Manaia and Irakehu (grand-daughter of Te Rakiwhakaputa of Rāpaki). He is described orally by his nephew, Hōne Taare Tīkao, as tall, about 1.93 metres (6 ft 4 in) in height, with an impressive reach with a taiaha (staff).

He was tattooed on one side of his face in a curved design. While this intriguing moko appeared to be partially completed, featuring blue spirals and lines that traced his wrinkle lines on one cheek only, such one-sided tattooing is known as moko-taha-tahi, or sometimes kawe-tahi.

== Capture and enslavement ==
In the early 1830s, during the time of the North Island Ngāti Toa war chief Te Rauparaha's excursions to conquer the South Island, the Tikao whānau (family), and rest of his hapū were almost annihilated.

According to pōua (elderly man) Hōne Taare Tīkao, Te Rauparaha could not have come at a worse time, as the Kaiapoi and Banks Peninsula hapū were divided against one another, and many had been killed. This bitter family feud had weakened Tikao's people so much that they fell prey to the northern war chief.

In May 1830, in a pre-emptive strike, the Ngāi Tūahuriri ambushed Te Rauparaha's men near the Kaiapoi Pā, killing eight rangatira (chiefs). Akarao's ūpoko ariki (high chief), the cruel and cowardly Tama-i-hara-nui, along with a relation and neighbour of Tikao's, named Tāngatahara, were involved in the ambush. After that ambush Tè Rauparaha departed back to his island stronghold on Kapiti Island, bearing a grudge.

Tikao, along with his parents, brother and other family members were taken captive by Te Rauparaha during one of his subsequent revenge attacks. In one version of events, the Tikao whānau were captured and taken away in the brig Elizabeth, after the Takapūneke incident. In another version, they were on a chance visit to the Kaiapoi Pā, when the stockade fell to the Ngāti Toa, towards the end of 1831. In a third version, they were captured in 1832 at the Onawe Pā massacre. (Note: The first version of events is credible, as it comes from his scholarly nephew, whose own father was also taken captive at the same time. In the later years of his life, Teone Taare Tikao acknowledged the significance of oral history and engaged with historian Herries Beattie to discuss his family history and legends. The book, Tikao Talks, is the product of these discussions.)

Either way, the Tikao whānau were taken by boat to Te Ruaparaha's island stronghold on Kapiti. Many of his friends and relatives were slaughtered.

Tikao was 22 and his brother Tāmati was 15. Their mother, Hakeke, dove over the side in Kaikoura. She made her way south to Otakou, and spent the rest of her life with relative there. Their father, Tauporiotu, died a slave, and is buried in Wellington.

Tikao attracted attention due to his remarkable physique and strength, earning respect even during his exile, including from his adversaries.

By the 1840s, many of Te Rauparaha's followers embraced Christianity and released their captives. Both brothers were eventually set free from Kapiti Island and crossed Cooks Strait.

Tikao's brother, Tāmati (also known as Pukurau), made his way to Wairua, where he joined Canon Stack's mission and became a lay reader in the church. There he married a distant relative, named Mairehe Rahera, and they had one child Hōne (Teone) Taare Tikao.

Meanwhile, Tikao embarked on numerous adventures. He joined a whaling crew out of Cloudy Bay run by whaler John "Jacky" Love. He was given the name Jack by the whalers.

Prior to the arrival of European whalers and flax traders, Southern Māori did not use first names. Tikao took the name Hone (meaning John), appending it to his ancestral name.

Over the course of several years, he sailed around the globe, visiting France and England, while also learning to speak some European languages. His nephew says he "went Home". The use of the word "Home" is interesting. "Home" is how New Zealanders of the day referred to the British Isles.

He eventually became homesick, and sailed home on a French whaler towards the end of 1839.

While in France, he helped the promoters of immigration to his homeland with information and promised them his sympathy and assistance should they land in Akaroa; however, upon reaching Cloudy Bay on his way home, he met with Taiaroa, the Otago chief, and possibly Tāngatahara, and discussed the coming of the two Pākeha nations. He decided to throw his influence on the side of the British, who, he was convinced would be the better ally.

Arriving home, in early 1840, he settled in Wakaroa (Pigeon Bay]) and also Ohae, a point at the head of Tikao Bay, where he gathered the remnants of his hapu around him.

Tikao Bay takes its name from him. The bay used to be called Okoropeke. "O" means place and "Koropeke" means "doubled up". The place was so named after the death of a great chieftainess who lived there for many years but froze to death and was found in a doubled-up position. Historian Gordon Oglivie described this place as a former army depot.

== Signed Te Tiriti o Waitangi ==
Commemorative plaque at Ōnuku Marae
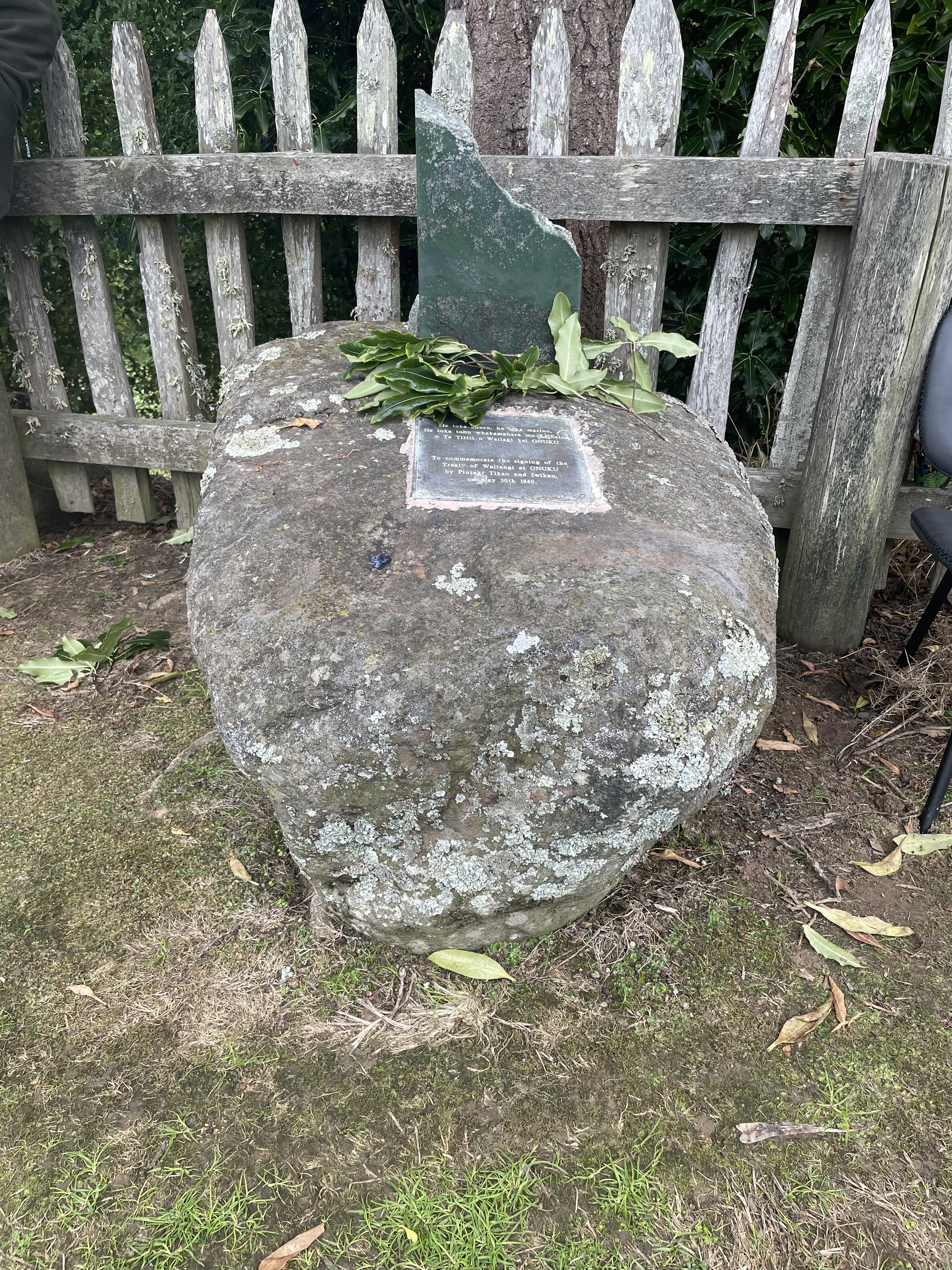
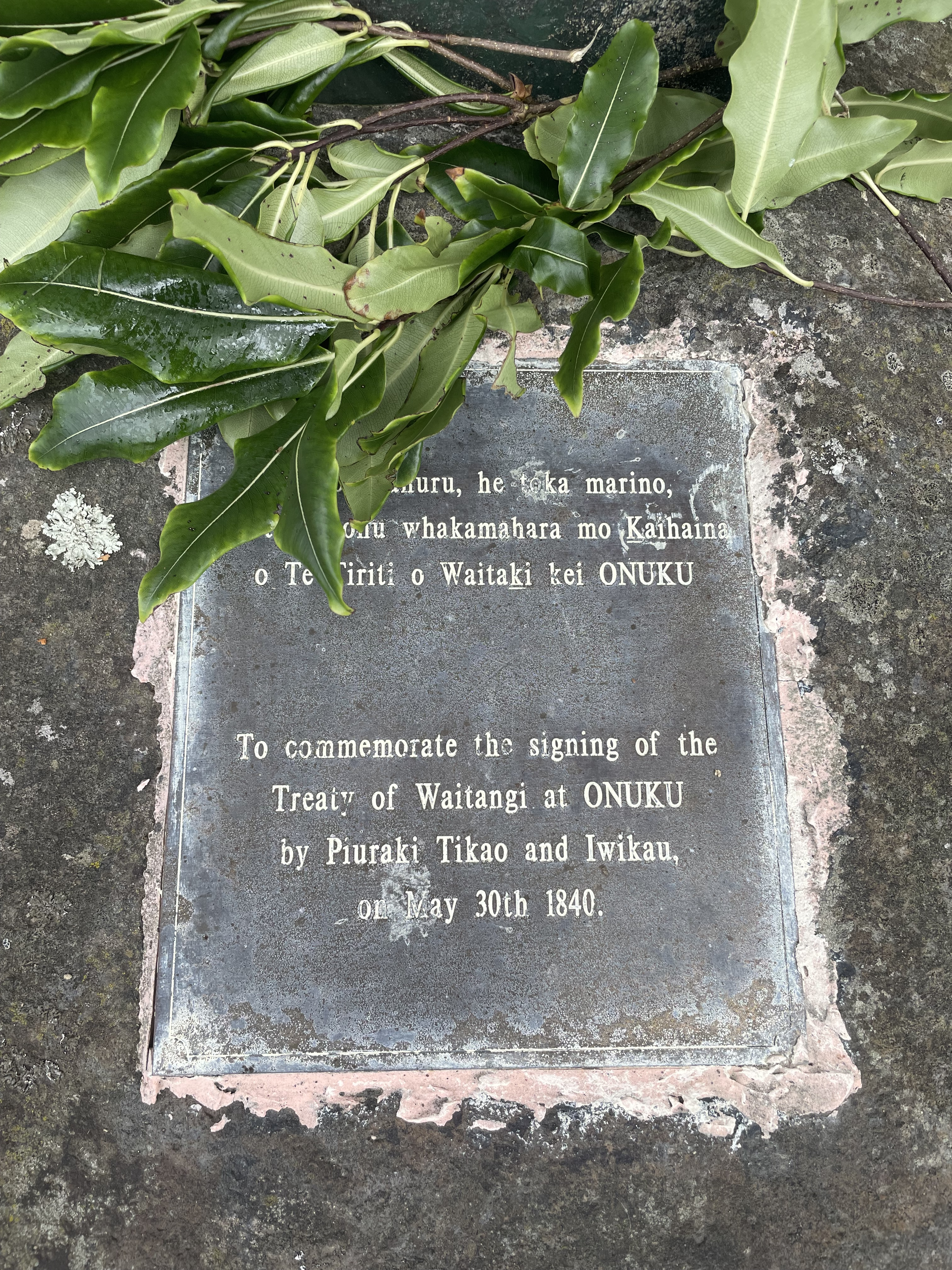

In May 1840, HMS Herald arrived at Akaroa, bringing Major Thomas Bunbury, who was carrying a copy of the Treaty of Waitangi for signature by the southern rangatira. It was signed on 30 May 1840, by Tikao, under the name John Love, and Iwikau. Iwikau had also enslaved by Te Rauparaha, but as rangatira of Ngato Rangiamoa, the senior line of the Ngai Tauhuriri hapu, he had been released earlier. His half-brother was Tama-i-hara-nui, who was captured on the brig Elizabeth.

Tikao's name is absent from the historical list of signatures. By this time, he had adopted the English name "John Love," which is the name that appears on the parchment alongside Iwikau's. The inscription beside his signature reads: Ko te tohu o John Love an intelligent native who calls himself rangatira o ngatirakuhua. "Ko te tohu o" roughly translates as "place of signature belonging to". The "rangatira o ngatirakuhua" part translates as "chief of Ngāi Te Kahukura hapū".

Major Bunbury, in his dispatch recording the visit to Akaroa, described Love as a very intelligent well-dressed native who spoke English better than any chief he had met.

At the signing at Onuku Marae, the two signatories were given blankets. Tāngatahara and other rangatira from the western side of the harbour decided to avoid meeting with the British.

== Land deals and disputes ==
Land deals in the 1840s were fraught. Iwikau was influential in Akaroa, even though he was from Kaiapoi and not from there, and lived in Puari, Potiriwi/Koukourarata (Port Levy). Taiaroa, Karetai and other rangitira from the south could not speak unilaterally for Akaroa, and when they tried, they aroused considerable tribal antagonism.

According to Ogilvie, signing the treaty did not deter Tikao from being a party to the "sale" of land to Captain Langlois on 14 August 1940. For this Tikao received one shirt, one gun and one pistol as his share. He took these items to Tuauau, the ūpoku (head) of Akarao, who now did not approve of the "sale" but kept the items all the same. Tuauau, known to the whalers as Tohow "sold" Banks Peninsula to Captain Clayton in 1837, and also signed the Langlois purchase deed. In 1843, Tikao led a demonstration in Akaroa over land settlement issues.

During negotiations around the Kemp's Deed, in the 1850s, Tikao objected to being banished, out of the commercial hub of Akaroa, and he lobbied, without success, for a better deal.

== Death ==
Near the end of his life, Tikao returned to Pigeon Bay, where his wife and children were interred, victims of one of the numerous epidemics of diseases introduced by Europeans that devastated the local population. He died in Pigeon Bay in June 1852, age 43 or 44, and was subsequently buried at Kaiapoi.

== Portraits ==
Three 19th-century art works claim to depict his likeness: a life-cast, a sketch and an etching.

=== Life-cast ===
A life-cast of a Tikao is believed to be of the three casts made by phrenologist Pierre-Marie Alexandre Dumoutier during Dumont d’Urville's last exploratory voyage. The cast, labelled ‘Pouka-lem’, is housed in the Christchurch Art Gallery. The casting occurred in Otago Harbour on 31 March 1840, just two months before he was present in Akaroa to become a signatory to the treaty.

The identity of the ‘Pouka-lem’ cast is uncertain. Its inscription calls the subject a "native of Otago". It is a possibility that Tikao was visiting, his Akaroa Harbour neighbour and whanaunga (relation), Tāngatahara and his wife, Heroua, who have been linked to the second and third casts; although it was Tāngatahara's killing of Te Pēhi Kupe at near the Kaiapoi Pā, that triggered the series of revenge attacks during which Tikao was captured and enslaved.

Unlike other casts he made on the Pacific voyage, Dumoutier has not written any whakapapa (genealogy) on the back of the three casts. In his journal, Dumoutier describes the encounter when some natives came aboard the Astrolabe.

I take the opportunity to propose one of them to have his head moulded. I offered all sorts of gifts but fail to interest him and it is only my old uniform overcoat that wins him over. Capai (it's good), he keeps repeating capai and, at last, he makes up his mind. Immediately scissors cut into his hair and, an hour later I hold the cast moulded from nature of a fairly handsome Zealander face whose hollowed tattoo is perfectly reproduced as a raised pattern in the mould. Now that the first step is taken I can expect to entice others to follow suit, and indeed this is what happens the following day. The man whose head I moulded the first day allows me to cast his wife's head. Another man who nearly dislocated his shoulder when shooting his gun, and to whom I gave some treatment, entrusts me with his head, and this completes my collection of casts for the inhabitants of Otago.

— Fiona Pardington, The Pressure of Sunlight Falling, Page 115

Tikoa, as mentioned above, spoke French, and if it were he, then one presumes Dumoutier would have recorded more than ka pai (good) in his journal.

All three casts were photographed in 2010 by Fiona Pardington. The tattoos are evident in the photos.

The one identified as Tāngatahara depicts a younger vigorous handsome man, with a moko-taha-tahi (tattoo) on the right side of his face only. Tangatahara would have been about 68 years old at that time. What's more, his nickname was "ugly man".

The one identified as Tikao depicts an older noble imposing man, with a full-face tattoo. Tikao would have been about 32 years old at that time.

Further doubts have been raised about the ability to convince men of their mana (status) to not only have their heads shaved but also to allow plaster applied and to breathe through straws up their nostrils for an hour. The head is considered the most tapu (sacred) part of a person's body.

The closed eyes of the cast heads give the ancestors a vulnerability that they would have been careful not to show at other times in their lives.

— Ross Calman (contributor), The Pressure of Sunlight Falling, page 113

=== Sketch ===
A sketch drawn by French artist Charles Meryon is purportedly of a Tikao. The sketch, labelled ‘Tikao naturel d’ Akaroa Nouv. Zilande’, is displayed in the National Library of Australia, in Canberra,. It depicts the head and upper body of a medium-built man in a woven cloak. The subject is bearded, untattooed and concentrating deeply. His face does not resemble the face on the life-cast. He has a full head of hair. The subject is possibly his brother Tamati or a person with the similar name of Tamakeke.

=== Etching ===
French artist Auguste Delatre made an etching from drawings made by Meryon, sometime between 1877 and 1888, decades after Tikao's death. The etching, labelled Tikao (full face), is displayed in the Bibliotheque Nationale. The subject's face appears older and more contented than the face in the sketch. His pose, cloak and hairstyle are also different. Once again, the depicted person does not wear a one-sided tattoo.
