= Meri Mangakāhia =

New Zealand suffragist

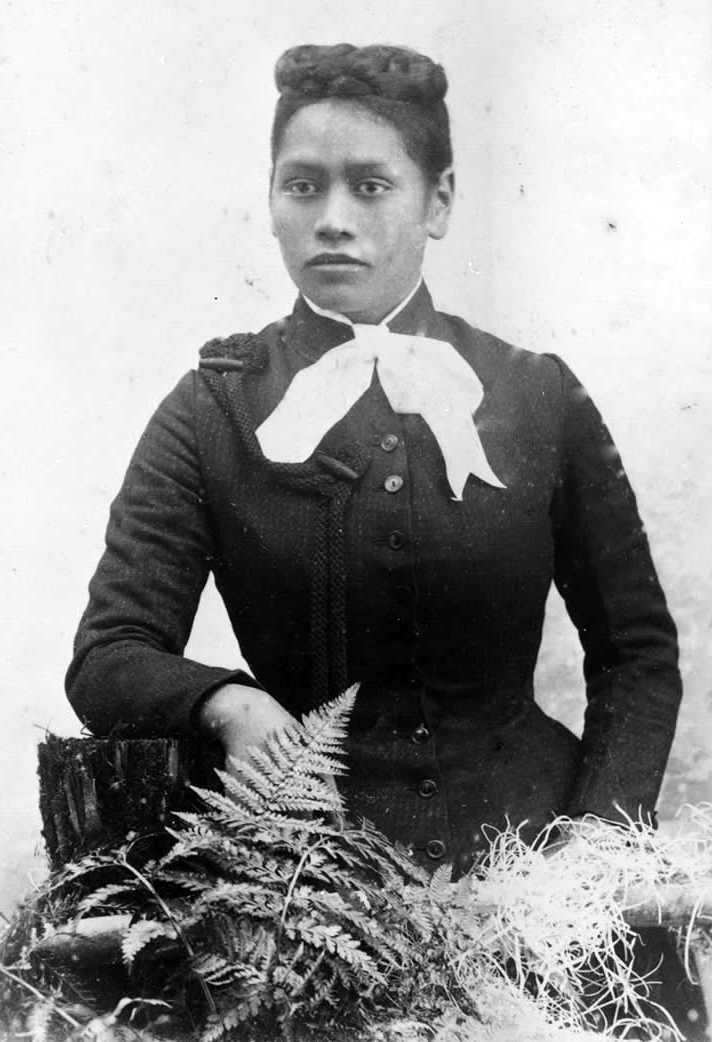
- Meri Te Tai Mangakāhia in the 1890s
- Born: Meri Te Tai; 22 May 1868; Lower Waihou, near Panguru, Northland, New Zealand
- Died: 10 October 1920 (aged 52); Panguru, Northland, New Zealand
- Occupation: Suffragist
- Spouse: Hāmiora Mangakāhia

Meri Te Tai Mangakāhia (22 May 1868 – 10 October 1920) was a campaigner for women's suffrage in New Zealand.

== Biography ==
Mangakāhia was born Meri Te Tai in Lower Waihou near Panguru in the Hokianga valley. A member of the Te Rarawa iwi, she was of Ngāti Te Rēinga, Ngāti Manawa and Te Kaitutae origin, and was the daughter of Re Te Tai, an influential chief. Mangakāhia was educated at St Mary's Convent in Auckland. She was an accomplished pianist.

Mangakāhia was the third wife of Hāmiora Mangakāhia, an assessor in the Native Land Court, and in June 1892 he was elected Premier of the Kotahitanga Parliament in Hawke's Bay.

In 1893, Mangakāhia was involved in establishing Ngā Kōmiti Wāhine, committees associated with the Kotahitanga Parliament.

Also in 1893, Mangakāhia accompanied wāhine rangatira (leader of chiefly status) Ākenehi Tōmoana to present a motion at the Te Kotahitanga Māori parliament in favour of women being allowed to vote for, and stand as, members of the Parliament. Mangakāhia was asked to speak to her motion, and in doing so became the first woman to speak to Te Kotahitanga. Mangakāhia's argument was that Māori women had always traditionally been landowners, but under Colonial law they were losing this land. She felt that Māori men weren't progressing to resolve land disputes with the Crown, and that Queen Victoria might respond better to requests from other women. She noted that Māori women were landowners, and should not be barred from political representation. In 1897, Mangakāhia's dreams were realised when women won the right to vote in Te Kotahitanga elections.

She later joined the women's committee of the Kotahitanga movement, committees which were early forerunners of the Māori Women's Welfare League, and remaining involved in Māori politics and welfare movements. She started Te Reiri Karamu (The Ladies' Column) with Niniwa I te Rangi of Wairarapa. This collection of articles and letters was a place where Māori women raised and debated women's issues.

She died of influenza at Panguru on 10 October 1920 according to family members, and was buried at Pureirei cemetery, Lower Waihou, near her father. She had four children – two sons, Mohi and Waipapa, and two daughters, Whangapoua Tangiora Edith and nurse Mabel Te Aowhaitini.

== See also ==
- List of suffragists and suffragettes
- Timeline of women's suffrage
- Women's suffrage in New Zealand
