= Ponatahi =

Rural locality in the Wellington Region, New Zealand

- Interactive map of Ponatahi
- Coordinates: 41°06′12″S 175°34′16″E
- Country: New Zealand
- Region: Wellington Region
- Territorial authority: Carterton District
- Electorates: Wairarapa; Ikaroa-Rāwhiti (Māori)

Government
  - Territorial Authority: Carterton District Council
  - Regional council: Greater Wellington Regional Council
  - Mayor of Carterton: Steve Cretney
  - Wairarapa MP: Mike Butterick
  - Ikaroa-Rāwhiti MP: Cushla Tangaere-Manuel

Ponatahi is a community in the Carterton District of New Zealand's North Island. It is located near the Ruamāhanga River south-southeast of Carterton and north east of Greytown. Nearby smaller settlements include Longbush to the south and Gladstone to the east.

Ponatahi is lowly populated and situated in a hilly rural area. The nearest state highway is State Highway 2 and the nearest railway is the Wairarapa Line, both in Carterton. Although there is a Ponatahi Christian School, it is no longer in Ponatahi but is located in Carterton.
