= Te Aitu-o-te-rangi Jury =

New Zealand tribal founding mother, landowner, and farmer

Te Aitu-o-te-rangi Jury (c. 1820–1854) was a New Zealand tribal founding mother, landowner and farmer. Of Māori descent, she identified with the Ngāti Kahungunu iwi. Her parents were Te Whatahoronui and his first wife, Aromea, who was the sister of Nuku-pewapewa. She was captured by the chief Te Rauparaha, who attacked her pā in Wairarapa. He took her to Kapiti Island, because of her high born status and because of her beauty he kept her as a wife. John Milsome Jury, a Pākehā whaler arrived at the island and fell in love with Te Aitu, as she did with him. They fled the island together by boat, they rowed all the way back to Wairarapa. Not long after, Te Rauparaha started his chase but could not catch the couple. She married the Englishman and started a family with him in the Wairarapa region which is within the borders of her tribal land. Her eldest child was Hoani Te Whatahoro Jury who was a prominent political leader involved in the creation of the first Tangata Whenua inclusive parliament.
