= Ngātuere Tāwhirimātea Tāwhao =

Ngātuere Tāwhirimātea Tāwhao (died 1890) was a Māori leader from the Ngāti Kahungunu iwi (tribe), during early European settlement of the Wairarapa region of New Zealand in the 19th century. He had risen to prominence as a tribal leader by the 1820s. His people were later attacked by other iwi and eventually displaced, before returning to the Wairarapa around the 1840s. This return coincided with early European colonisation in the region, which sometimes brought him into conflict with settlers; missionaries, including William Colenso; and even other Māori chiefs, in particular Te Manihera Te Rangi-taka-i-waho. While he had numerous disagreements with the New Zealand colonial government over land purchases, he also kept his people from attacking European settlers during the New Zealand Wars, in order to protect the interests of himself and his people. He died on 29 November 1890.
