= Nuku-pewapewa =

New Zealand Māori leader

Nuku-pewapewa (fl. 1820–1834) was a New Zealand tribal leader. Of Māori descent, he identified with the Ngāti Kahungunu iwi. He was born in the Wairarapa, New Zealand, probably late in the eighteenth century. Te Aitu-o-te-rangi Jury was his niece, the daughter of his sister Aromea.

A tōtara whakairo (carved figure) which represents Nuku-pewapewa is located at Pāpāwai marae.
