= Ōtūtereinga =

Cliff in Akaroa, New Zealand

Coordinates: 43.81324°S 172.91186°E

- Cliff
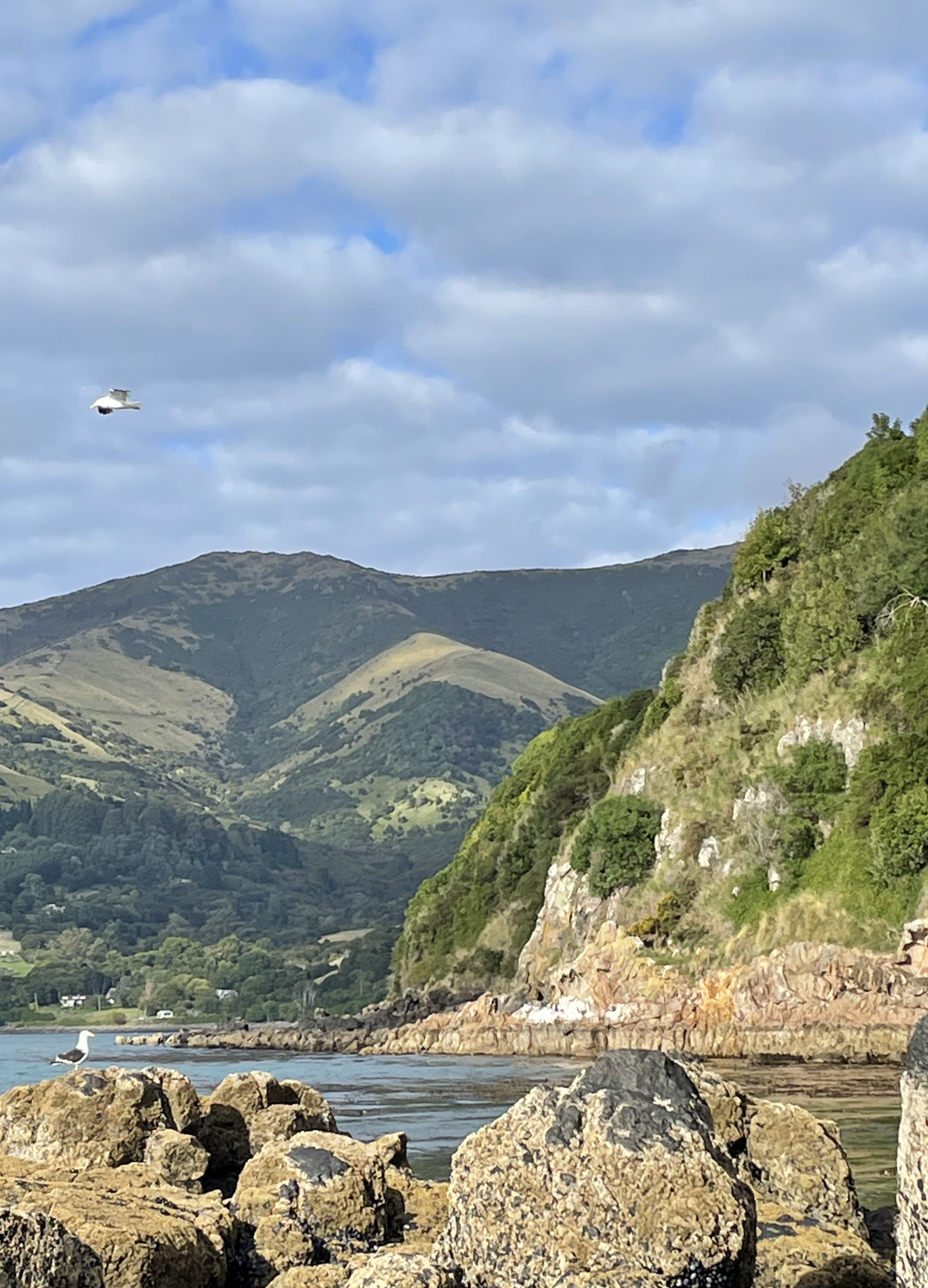
- Literally the name means "the flitting place from which spirits pass to the underworld"
- Coordinates
- Formed by: Volcanic and wave action
- Volcanic field: Banks Peninsula Volcano

Ōtūtereinga is a cliff at the northern end of Wainui, on the western side of Akaroa Harbour. Its name is also spelt Otutereinga and O Tu Te Reinga. "Ō" means "place of", "tu" translates to "stand", "te" signifies "the", and "reinga" refers to the "flitting place from which spirits transition to the underworld", similar to Cape Reinga.

Since the mid-nineteenth century, the only things that have fallen off this cliff are household waste, as the local council established the Wainui Dump in the area. The landfill has since been closed.

At this location, powerful waves crash against the rocky shore, a phenomenon that was traditionally viewed by the Māori as a warning sign of an impending storm. Tāngatahara, the chief defender of the Ōnawe Pā, is buried near the sea in a small ancient urupā (burial ground).
