= Longbush Cottage =

Heritage garden in New Zealand

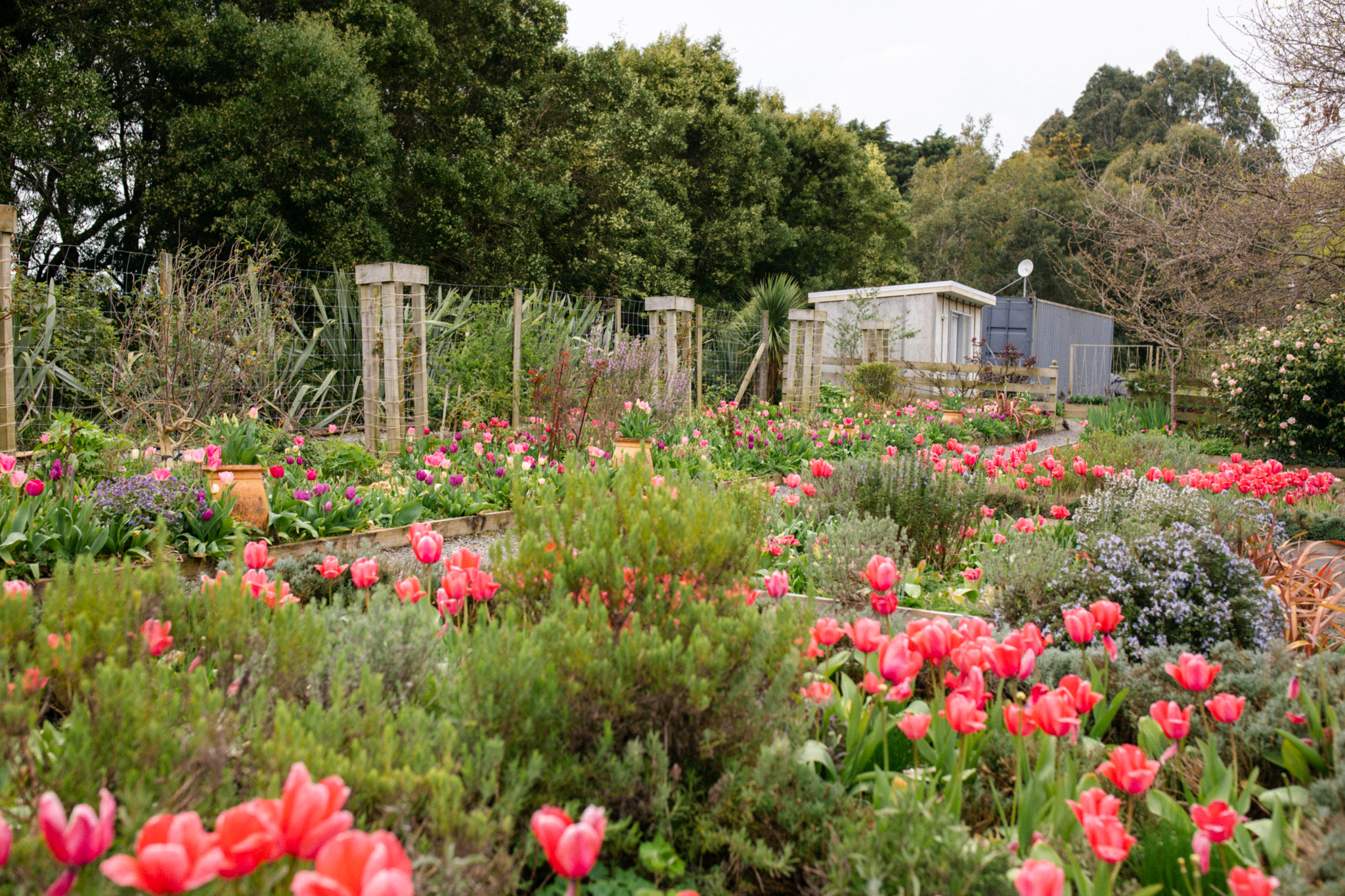
- Longbush Cottage Tulips
- Interactive map of Longbush Cottage
- Type: Country garden / Heritage cottage garden
- Location: Longbush, Carterton, Wairarapa, New Zealand
- Coordinates: 41.1687°S 175.5946°E
- Established: 1890s (cottage) / Gardens developed since about 2015
- Operator: Luke Gardner
- Status: Open to visitors
- Website: longbushcottage.co.nz

Longbush Cottage is a heritage garden and restored 1890s cottage in the Wairarapa, New Zealand.

It is recognised as a Four Star – Garden of Significance by the New Zealand Gardens Trust.

== History ==
Longbush Cottage was established by gardener and designer Luke Gardner.

The cottage dates from the 1890s and was restored as the centrepiece of a modern garden inspired by Arts and Crafts traditions.

The gardens were opened to the public in 2020 as part of the Wairarapa Garden Tour.

== Design and features ==
Gardner describes his garden as “a modern spin on the cottage style, inspired by 20th-century Arts and Crafts gardens.”

The layout is formally structured with straight lines and vistas, while the planting is relaxed and playfully wild. Indigenous and exotic plants are combined to create what Gardner calls “a distinctly New Zealand flavour.”

The gardens cover approximately one hectare and include a variety of themed “garden rooms.” Notable features are:

- A large tulip display in spring.
- Native plant zones and a relaxed wildness that blend formal structure with free-flowing colour.
- Distinct seasonal displays, glasshouses for visitor comfort, and displays of sculptures and seasonal plant compositions.

The “garden rooms” each highlight seasonal colour, including spring bulbs, perennials, roses, and annuals.

== Events and public access ==
Longbush Cottage is open to visitors for self-guided tours, typically lasting around one hour.

The property also hosts seasonal events, notably the annual Tulip Festival, where thousands of bulbs are in bloom.

== Recognition ==
The garden is formally assessed and holds a Four Star rating as a Garden of Significance from the New Zealand Gardens Trust.
