= Mohi Te Ātahīkoia =

New Zealand Māori tribal leader (died 1928)

2nd Speaker of the House of Te Kotahitanga (Māori Parliament)
- In office 1895–1895
- Preceded by: Henare Tomoana

Member of Te Kotahitanga (Māori Parliament)
- In office June 1892 – 1902

Personal details
- Born: Waimārama, Hawke's Bay New Zealand
- Died: 30 June 1928

Mohi Te Ātahīkoia (died 1928) was a New Zealand Māori leader and politician within the Ngāti Kahungunu tribe. He was born in Waimārama, Hawke's Bay and was most connected to the subtribes (hapū) of the area, Ngāti Whakaiti and Ngāti Kautere.

Te Ātahīkoia was one of six candidates in the 1899 election for the Eastern Maori electorate. He came second after Wi Pere. He was also active with the Te Kotahitanga movement for an independent Māori parliament.

Later in life he became known for his genealogies and histories, especially a history of the Waimārama area and Hawke's Bay, Ko tēnei kōrero nō Hawaiki rānoa.

He died at Pakipaki on 30 June 1928 and was buried in Waimārama.
