= Te Kotahitanga =

1890s movement for an independent New Zealand Māori parliament

Māori Parliament Movement Te Kotahitanga

Type
- Type: Bicameral
- Houses: Te Whare Ariki (Upper House); Te Whare o Raro (Lower House)

History
- Founded: 14 June 1892
- Disbanded: 21 March 1902
- Succeeded by: Māori councils

Leadership
- Chairman: Hoani Te Whatahoro Jury (1892); Hone Taare Tikao (1893); Te Keepa Te Rangi-pūawhe (1896)
- Speaker: Henare Tomoana(1892-1894); Mohi Te Atahikoia (1895)
- Premier: Hamiora Mangakahia (1892, 1897, 1898); Hoani Te Whatahoro Jury (1893, 1894)
- Seats: 140 (1892); 44 (Whare Ariki); 96 (Whare o Raro)

Meeting place
- Waipatu (1892, 1893), Pākirikiri (1894), Rotorua (1895), Taupō (1896), Pāpāwai (1897, 1898), Rotorua (1900, 1901), Waiōmatatini (1902)

Te Kotahitanga
- Design: A flag designed by Norman Te Whata which features a circle, off-center to hoist, with two crossed mere with the word "Kotahitanga" above it.
- Designed by: Norman Te Whata

The Kotahitanga movement was an autonomous Māori parliament convened annually in New Zealand from 1892 until 1902. Though not recognised by the New Zealand Government, the Māori Parliament was an influential body while it lasted. By 1902 its role was largely superseded by the Māori councils established by James Carroll and Hōne Heke Ngāpua through the Māori Councils Act 1900. As a result, Kotahitanga members unanimously voted for its dissolution at the 10th Parliament at Waiōmatatini in 1902.

Te Kotahitanga was distinct from Te Kauhanganui, the Māori parliament established by the Kingitanga movement in the late 1880s, because it called for the union of all Māori tribes, whereas Te Kauhanganui was convened by and for the hapū of the Waikato-Tainui region. In 1895 the two movements considered merging, but this ultimately failed.

== Sessions ==
=== Waipatu 1892 ===
The first formal session of Te Kotahitanga was held in June 1892 at Waipatu in Heretaunga. It was hosted by the former Member of Parliament for the Eastern Maori electorate, Henare Tomoana. 96 representatives sat in the Whare o Raro and 44 chiefs sat in the Whare Ariki. Tomoana was elected Speaker of the House because his tenure in parliament gave him the experience necessary to guide debates and maintain order. Hoani Te Whatahoro Jury was elected chairman, the formal head of the Whare o Raro, and Hamiora Mangakahia was elected premier, a position that made him the chief spokesperson for the movement.

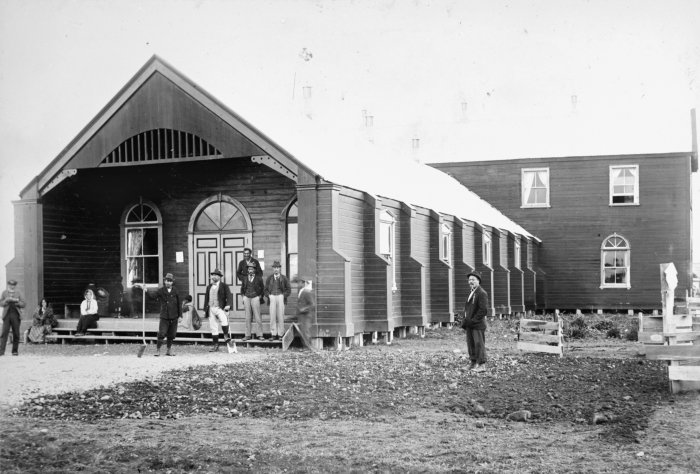
Pāpāwai House in 1897, built to host the 6th and 7th sittings of the Kotahitanga Parliament.

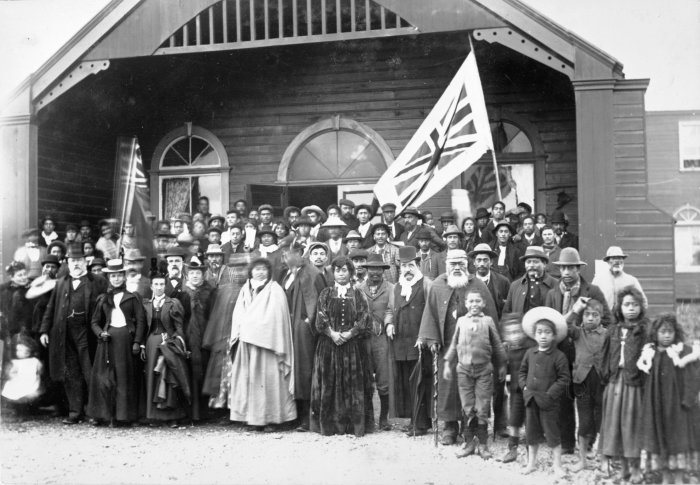
The 6th sitting of the ''Kotahitanga'' Parliament at Pāpāwai in 1897, with Prime Minister of New Zealand Richard Seddon in attendance.

=== Waipatu 1893 ===
In 1893 the second session of Te Kotahitanga was also convened at Waipatu, though this session was poorly attended. Only 58 representatives sat in the Whare o Raro. At that time, Mangakahia had fallen out of favour with many of the movement's representatives and was not returned as premier. Hoani Te Whatahoro Jury was elected in his place.

=== Pakirikiri 1894 ===
The 1894 session took place at Pakirikiri, near Gisborne. The session, hosted by local chief Otene Pitau, was well attended and lasted for over a month.

=== Rotorua 1895 ===
The 1895 session of Te Kotahitanga was convened at Ohinemutu in Rotorua. Hamiora Mangakahia was re-elected for a second term as premier, and the role of speaker was given to Mohi Te Ātahīkoia of Ngāti Kahungunu. In the course of this session, Henare Tomoana accused Mangakahia of financial mismanagement of Te Kotahitanga during his first term as premier, and attempted to force his resignation. But Mangakahia was able to demonstrate in rebuttal that the mismanagement of Kotahitanga funds had actually developed during the term of his successor, Hoani Te Whatahoro Jury. The session is also notable as the setting for a potential merger of Te Kotahitanga with the Kingitanga movement. Mahuta Tāwhiao, the new King of the Waikato-Tainui tribes, was visited by representatives from the 1895 sitting of Te Kotahitanga, who invited him to sign the Kotahitanga deed of union, calling for the political union of all Māori tribes. Mahuta appointed a committee to consider the proposal, but was undermined by Waikato chief Tupu Atanatiu Taingakawa Te Waharoa, who circulated a rival deed of union calling for all Māori tribes to unite under the Kingitanga.

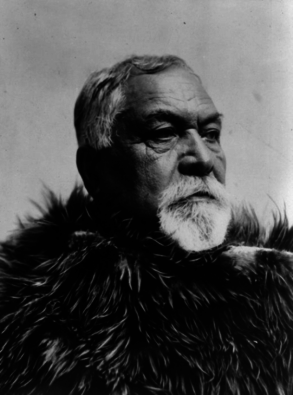
Hoani Te Whatahoro Jury, elected first Chairman of Te Kotahitanga and later premier.

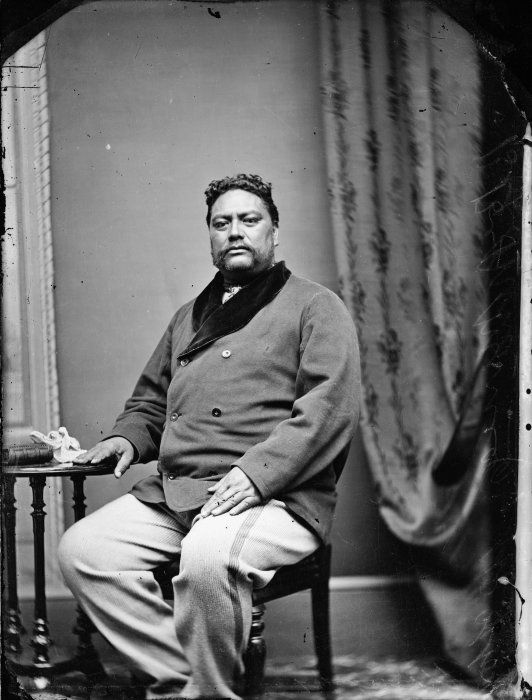
Henare Tomoana, formerly a member of the New Zealand Parliament for Eastern Maori, served as Speaker of Te Kotahitanga.

== Membership ==
The lower house, or Whare o Raro, had 96 members, elected at large from electorates defined according to tribal affiliation. The upper house, or Whare Ariki, was composed of 44 paramount chiefs elected by the members of the Whare o Raro. 127 representatives filled the 140 positions in both houses at the parliament's first sitting at Waipatu Marae in 1892, as 13 chiefs were elected to both houses.

=== Whare o Raro members (1892) ===
Constituency	Member	Iwi affiliation	Member's origin	Position
Ngāpuhi	Wikiriwhi Hemana	Ngāti Whatua	Kaipara	
Ngāpuhi	Muriwai Hepehi	Ngāpuhi, Te Rarawa	Whangaroa	
Ngāpuhi	Kaipo Hotereni	Ngāpuhi, Te Rarawa	Waihou ki te Kauru	
Ngāpuhi	Miti Kakau	Te Rarawa	Hokianga	
Ngāpuhi	Wi Katene	Ngāpuhi	Ōhaeawai, Tautoro	
Ngāpuhi	Maihi Kawiti	Ngāpuhi	Waiomio, Taumarere	
Ngāpuhi	Pomare Kingi	Ngāpuhi	Whatitiri	
Ngāpuhi	Karena Kiwa	Ngāpuhi	Whangaroa	
Ngāpuhi	Taniora Moto	Te Rarawa	Mangamuka	
Ngāpuhi	Eramiha Paikea	Ngāti Whatua	Kaipara	
Ngāpuhi	Ngakuru Pana	Ngāpuhi, Te Rarawa	Waimamaku	
Ngāpuhi	Kereama Papaka	Ngāpuhi	Waikara	
Ngāpuhi	Peri Paraihe	Te Rarawa	Hokianga	
Ngāpuhi	Hemi Parata	Ngāti Whatua	Te Awaroa, Kaipara	
Ngāpuhi	Netana Patuawa	Ngāti Whatua	Opanaki, Maunganui	
Ngāpuhi	Te Kaka Porowini	Ngāpuhi	Te Karetu, Pewhairangi	
Ngāpuhi	Timoti Puhipi	Te Rarawa	Ahipara, Kaitara, Te Awanui	
Ngāpuhi	Pere Riwhi	Ngāpuhi	Whirinaki	
Ngāpuhi	Riwi Taikawa	Ngāpuhi	Whangārei, Kaihou	
Ngāpuhi	Pene Taui	Ngāpuhi	Oromahoe, Waimate	
Ngāpuhi	Heremia Te Wake	Te Rarawa	Hokianga	
Ngāpuhi	Re Te Tai Maunga	Te Rarawa	Hokianga	
Ngāpuhi	Wiki Te Pirihi	Ngāpuhi	Whangārei, Kaihou	
Ngāpuhi	Mitai Titore	Ngāpuhi	Mangakāhia, Ahuahu	
Ngāpuhi	Hemi Tupe	Ngāpuhi	Whangaroa	
Ngāpuhi	Raniera Wharerau	Ngāpuhi	Waima	
Ngāpuhi	Te Paki Wihongi	Ngāpuhi	Kaikohe	
Ngāpuhi	Mohi Wikitahi	Ngāpuhi	Waima	
Te Tai Hauāuru	Hoani Amorangi	Ngāti Raukawa, Muaupoko		
Te Tai Hauāuru	Reha Aperahama	Ngāti Maru	Te Aroha	
Te Tai Hauāuru	Hoani Wiremu Hipango	Ngāti Hau	Whanganui	
Te Tai Hauāuru	Hamiora Mangakahia	Ngāti Whanaua, Ngāti Pare	Whitianga	Premier
Te Tai Hauāuru	Wiremu Ngapaki	Ngāti Ruanui	Hāwera, Pātea	
Te Tai Hauāuru	Ngarangikatitia-Tutae	Ngāti Ruanui		
Te Tai Hauāuru	Manahi Paewai	Rangitane	Manawatu	
Te Tai Hauāuru	Te Aohau Pungarehu	Ngāti Raukawa	Waikato	
Te Tai Hauāuru	Ropiha Rangihaukori		Ōpunake	
Te Tai Hauāuru	Hamapiri Te Arahori	Ngāti Maniapoto	Ōtorohanga, Te Kūiti	
Te Tai Hauāuru	Wi Te Kākākura	Ngāti Awa	Waitotara, Mokau	
Te Tai Hauāuru	Wiari Te Kuri	Ngāti Maniapoto	Ōtorohanga, Te Kūiti	
Te Tai Hauāuru	Te Manaotawhaki	Ngāti Apa	Manawatu	
Te Tai Hauāuru	Rore Te Rangiheuea	Rangitane	Warupere	
Te Tai Hauāuru	Te Keepa Te Rangihiwinui	Ngāti Awa	Hāwera, Taranaki	
Te Tai Hauāuru	E.H. Te Taitea	Ngāti Awa	Te Whanganui-a-Tara	
Te Tai Hauāuru	E.H. Te Taitea	Ngāti Toa	Porirua, Waikanae	
Te Tai Hauāuru	Kipa Te Whatanui	Ngāti Raukawa, Muaupoko	Otaki	
Te Tai Hauāuru	Hamiora Tupaea	Ngai Te Rangi	Tauranga	
Te Tai Rawhiti	Kipa Anaru	Ngāti Kahungunu	Mohaka	
Te Tai Rawhiti	Te Makiri Hona	Te Urewera Katoa	Te Waimana	
Te Tai Rawhiti	Hoani Kehua	Ngāti Kahungunu	Wairoa	
Te Tai Rawhiti	Hoani Kerei	Te Whanau-a-Apanui	Whangaparaoa	
Te Tai Rawhiti	Akuhata Kiharoa	Te Arawa	Wairakei, Rotorua	
Te Tai Rawhiti	Wiremu Kupa	Ngāti Kahungunu	Mohaka	
Te Tai Rawhiti	Nepia Mahuika	Ngāti Porou	Waiapu	
Te Tai Rawhiti	Hori Mania	Ngāti Kahungunu	Wairoa	
Te Tai Rawhiti	Tuta Nihoniho	Ngāti Porou	Waiapu	
Te Tai Rawhiti	Wi Pakai	Ngāti Hineuru		
Te Tai Rawhiti	Eruini Paranihi	Ngāti Tuwharetoa	Taupō-nui-a-tia	
Te Tai Rawhiti	Wiremu Potae	Te Aitanga-a-Hauiti	Tolaga Bay	
Te Tai Rawhiti	Timi Rimene	Te Arawa, Ngāti Pikiao	Maketu	
Te Tai Rawhiti	H. Ropiha	Ngāti Kahungunu	Ahuriri, Heretaunga	
Te Tai Rawhiti	Hoani Ruru	Ngāti Kahungunu	Gisborne ki Paritu	
Te Tai Rawhiti	H. M. Tamahau	Ngāti Kahungunu	Wairarapa	
Te Tai Rawhiti	Karaitiana Te Amaru	Te Aitanga-a-Hauiti	Tolaga Bay	
Te Tai Rawhiti	Mohi Te Atahikoia	Ngāti Kahungunu	Wairarapa	
Te Tai Rawhiti	H. Te Aweawe	Ngāti Kahungunu	Ahuriri, Heretaunga	
Te Tai Rawhiti	Apiata Te Hame	Te Aitanga-a-Hauiti	Tolaga Bay	
Te Tai Rawhiti	Hami Te Heru	Ngāti Kahungunu	Te Paritu ki te Kaha-a-Tureia	
Te Tai Rawhiti	Tureiti Te Heuheu Tukino V	Ngāti Tuwharetoa	Taupō-nui-a-tia	
Te Tai Rawhiti	Wi Te Houkamau	Ngāti Porou	Whangaparaoa	
Te Tai Rawhiti	Anaru Te Kakahi	Ngāti Porou	Waiapu	
Te Tai Rawhiti	Aperahama Te Kume	Ngāti Tuwharetoa	Taupō-nui-a-tia	
Te Tai Rawhiti	Maraku Te Rangihirawea	Ngāti Tuwharetoa	Taupō-nui-a-tia	
Te Tai Rawhiti	H. Te Rango	Ngāti Kahungunu	Ahuriri, Heretaunga	
Te Tai Rawhiti	Hoani Te Rohurohu	Ngāti Kahungunu	Gisborne ki Paritu	
Te Tai Rawhiti	Nikora Te Wakaunua	Manawa	Tarawera, Rangitaiki	
Te Tai Rawhiti	Hoani Te Whatahoro Jury	Ngāti Kahungunu	Ahuriri, Heretaunga	Chairman
Te Tai Rawhiti	Rewi Toheriri	Ngāti Kahungunu	Te Paritu ki te Kaha-a-Tureia	
Te Tai Rawhiti	Henare Tomoana	Ngāti Kahungunu	Ahuriri, Heretaunga	Speaker of the House
Te Tai Rawhiti	Hoani Paraone Tunuiarangi	Ngāti Kahungunu	Wairarapa	
Te Tai Rawhiti	Hapimana Tunupaura	Ngāti Kahungunu	Wairoa	
Te Tai Rawhiti	Raniera Turoa	Ngāti Kahungunu	Gisborne ki Paritu	
Te Tai Rawhiti	Hemi Waeka	Ngāti Kahungunu	Gisborne ki Paritu	
Te Tai Rawhiti	Tupara	Te Arawa	Wairakei, Rotorua	
Te Tai Rawhiti	Toha	Ngāti Kahungunu	Wairoa	
Te Tai Rawhiti	Rahurahu	Ngāti Kahungunu	Wairoa	
Te Tai Rawhiti	Netane	Te Urewera Katoa	Ruatoki	
Te Waipounamu	Raniera Erihana	Ngāi Tahu	Waikouaiti	
Te Waipounamu	Taituha Hape	Ngāi Tahu	Kaiapoi	
Te Waipounamu	Hoani Maaka	Ngāi Tahu	Kaiapoi	
Te Waipounamu	Wiwi Tairoa	Ngāi Tahu	Arahura, Hauauru	
Te Waipounamu	Timoti Te Whiu	Ngāi Tahu	Wairewa	
Te Waipounamu	Hone Taare Tikao	Ngāi Tahu	Wairewa	
Te Waipounamu	Pita Tipa	Ngāi Tahu	Moerangi	
Te Waipounamu	Paratenei Tunuiarangi	Ngāi Tahu	Kaiapoi	
Te Waipounamu	Taniora Rau	Rangitane, Ngāti Toa	Arapawa	

=== Whare Ariki Members (1892) ===
Member	Iwi affiliation
Te Keepa Te Rangihiwinui	Ngāti Awa
Takarangi Mete Kingi	Ngāti Awa
Ropata Te Ao	Ngāti Raukawa
Kipa Te Whatanui	Ngāti Raukawa
Himona Papaka	Ngāti Tuwharetoa
Paora Ngawaha	Ngāti Tuwharetoa
Hoani Nahe	Ngāti Maru
Pita Tipa	Ngāi Tahu
Taiuru	Ngāti Taurawhiti
Kingi Te Herekiekie	Ngāti Tuwharetoa
Tuakau	Ngāti Tuwharetoa
Raihania Takapa	Ngāti Awa
Akapita Te We	Ngāi Tūhoe
Wi Katene	Ngāpuhi
Paratene Tunuiarangi	Ngāi Tahu
Hemi Tupe	Ngāpuhi
Pomare Kingi	Ngāpuhi
Maihi Kawiti	Ngāpuhi
Eramiha Paikea	Ngāti Whatua
Mitikakau	Te Rarawa
Re Te Tai Maunga	Te Rarawa
Akuhata Kiharoa	Te Arawa
Timoti Puhipi	Te Rarawa
Wi Te Houkamau	Ngāti Porou
Wiremu Potae	Ngāti Porou
Nepia Mahuika	Ngāti Porou
Ropata Wahawaha	Ngāti Porou
Wi Pere	Ngāti Kahungunu
Henare Matua	Ngāti Kahungunu
Kerei Te Ota	Ngāti Kahungunu
Hami Te Hau	Ngāti Kahungunu
Hirini Te Kani	Ngāti Kahungunu
Puhara Hawaikirangi	Ngāti Kahungunu
Teira Tiakitai	Ngāti Kahungunu
Ekengarangi Hapuku	Ngāti Kahungunu
Hapuku Te Nahu	Ngāti Kahungunu
Paora Ropiha	Ngāti Kahungunu
Peni Te Uamairangi	Ngāti Kahungunu
Wiremu M. Porotene	Ngāti Kahungunu
Wiki Moa Ngamanako	Ngāti Hineuru
Ngawaka te Wharehina	Ngāti Hine
Piripi Te Maari	Ngāti Kahungunu
Tamati M. Te Apatu	Ngāti Kahungunu
Hori H. Te Huki	Ngāti Kahungunu
