= Pāpāwai =

Historic settlement and marae (meeting house)

- Locality
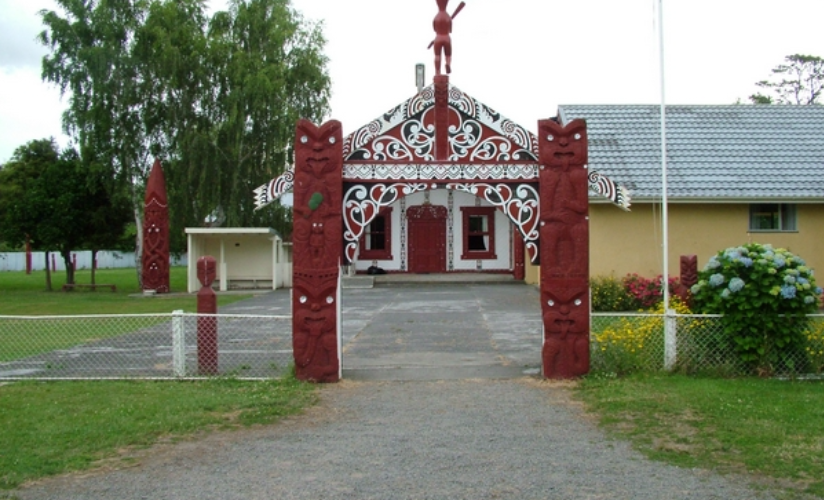
- Looking through the waharoa (gate) and on to the meeting house Hikurangi in 2005
- Interactive map of Pāpāwai
- Coordinates: 41°05′48″S 175°29′10″E
- Region: Wellington Region
- Territorial authority: South Wairarapa District
- Ward: Greytown Ward
- Community: Greytown Community
- Electorates: Wairarapa; Ikaroa-Rāwhiti (Māori)

Government
  - Territorial Authority: South Wairarapa District Council
  - Regional council: Greater Wellington Regional Council
  - Mayor of South Wairarapa: Fran Wilde
  - Wairarapa MP: Mike Butterick
  - Ikaroa-Rāwhiti MP: Cushla Tangaere-Manuel

Area
  - Total: 27.81 km^{2} (10.74 sq mi)

Population (2023 Census)
  - Total: 363
  - Density: 13.1/km^{2} (33.8/sq mi)

Pāpāwai is a historic settlement and marae located near Greytown, New Zealand. In the late 19th century, the marae was an important site of Te Kotahitanga, the Māori parliament movement.

== Pāpāwai marae ==
Pāpāwai is located inland, four kilometres (2.5 mi) east of Greytown, a rural town in the centre of the Wairarapa region of the lower North Island. It is affiliated with the Ngāti Kahungunu hapū of Ngāti Kahukuranui o Kahungunu Kauiti, Ngāti Meroiti and Ngāti Moe, and the Rangitāne hapū of Ngāti Meroiti, Ngāti Moe, Ngāti Tauiao and Ngāti Tūkoko.

The name Pāpāwai means 'the tears of mother earth'. The marae is listed as a wāhi tūpuna (place important to Māori for its ancestral significance and associated cultural and traditional values) by Heritage New Zealand.

== History ==
Pāpāwai was established in the 1850s, when the government set aside land for a Māori settlement near Greytown. At the time, the area had a flour mill, school, and newspaper, Te Puke ki Hikurangi.

The settlement experienced rapid growth under the leadership of Hāmuera Tamahau Mahupuku in the 1880s. The whare tūpuna (meeting house), Hikurangi, was built in 1888. The marae is surrounded by 18 tōtara whakairo (carved figures), which represented famous individuals at the time, including leader Nukupewapewa and the local Pākehā settler, William Mein Smith. Uniquely, the figures faced inwards to represent peace between Māori and Pākehā, rather than looking outwards as they traditionally would.

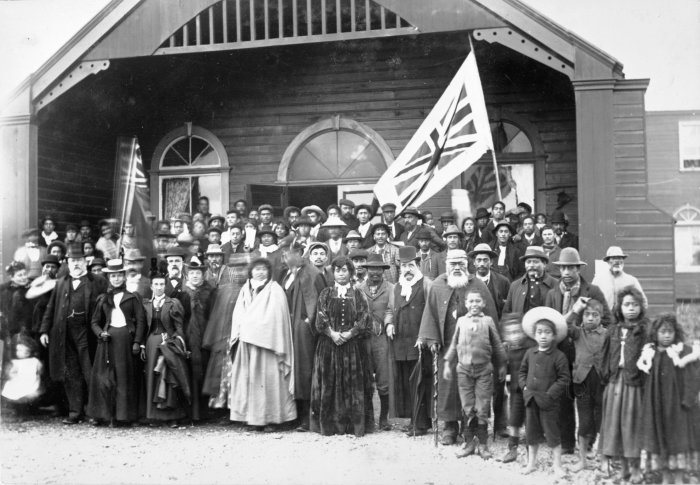
Group standing at the opening of the large two-storeyed complex in 1897. Richard Seddon stands to the left of the group.

A larger, T-shaped building was established beside Hikurangi in time for hosting Te Kotahitanga sittings. This building was composed of two sections. Aotea was a large meeting hall capable of holding 1,000 people, and Te Waipounamu was a two-storey building with sleeping quarters on the top floor and a wharekai (dining hall) below, able to seat 300.

Meetings for Te Kotahitanga, the Māori parliament movement, were held at Pāpāwai in 1897 and 1898. At this time, the settlement was home to 3,000 residents, and was known as 'the Māori capital'. Notably, a resolution to end Māori land sales was passed during these meetings, and those gathered were visited by Governor Ranfurly and Premier Richard Seddon.

The settlement was visited by Minister of Native Affairs Sir Apirana Ngata in 1934 to meet with chiefs from Ngāti Kahungunu and Ngāpuhi, and the mayor of Greytown at the time Henry Thomas Rees.

The buildings at Pāpāwai began to fall into disrepair in the 1910s, with the Aotea and Te Waipounamu complex damaged by strong winds in 1934. Conservation work began on the whakairo figures in the 1960s, and in the late 1980s these were fully restored. Hikurangi was moved to become the new meeting house, and the marae is well used by the community today.

== Demographics ==
Pāpāwai locality covers 27.81 km^{2} (10.74 sq mi). It is part of the larger Tauherenikau statistical area.

Historical population
Year	Pop.	±% p.a.
2006	252	—
2013	318	+3.38%
2018	327	+0.56%
2023	363	+2.11%

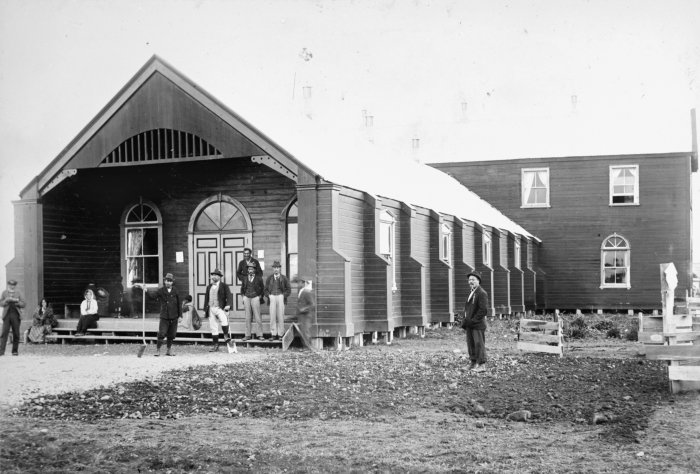
Large two-storeyed house built for meetings of the Māori Parliament at Pāpāwai, 1897

Pāpāwai had a population of 363 in the 2023 New Zealand census, an increase of 36 people (11.0%) since the 2018 census, and an increase of 45 people (14.2%) since the 2013 census. There were 171 males and 186 females in 135 dwellings. 3.3% of people identified as LGBTIQ+. There were 45 people (12.4%) aged under 15 years, 69 (19.0%) aged 15 to 29, 168 (46.3%) aged 30 to 64, and 81 (22.3%) aged 65 or older.

People could identify as more than one ethnicity. The results were 81.0% European (Pākehā); 14.9% Māori; 9.9% Pasifika; 4.1% Asian; and 0.8% Middle Eastern, Latin American and African New Zealanders (MELAA). English was spoken by 95.0%, Māori by 5.0%, Samoan by 6.6%, and other languages by 8.3%. The percentage of people born overseas was 27.3, compared with 28.8% nationally.

Religious affiliations were 40.5% Christian, 0.8% Māori religious beliefs, 0.8% Buddhist, 0.8% Jewish, and 0.8% other religions. People who answered that they had no religion were 47.9%, and 8.3% of people did not answer the census question.

Of those at least 15 years old, 90 (28.3%) people had a bachelor's or higher degree, 144 (45.3%) had a post-high school certificate or diploma, and 84 (26.4%) people exclusively held high school qualifications. 48 people (15.1%) earned over $100,000 compared to 12.1% nationally. The employment status of those at least 15 was 159 (50.0%) full-time, 57 (17.9%) part-time, and 6 (1.9%) unemployed.
