= Te Mānihera Te Rangi-taka-i-waho =

Te Mānihera Te Rangi-taka-i-waho (1800–1885) was a New Zealand tribal leader, farmer and land assessor. Of Māori descent, he identified with the Ngāti Kahungunu iwi. He was born at Pāpāwai near present-day Greytown in the Wairarapa, New Zealand.
