= Longbush, Wellington =

Longbush
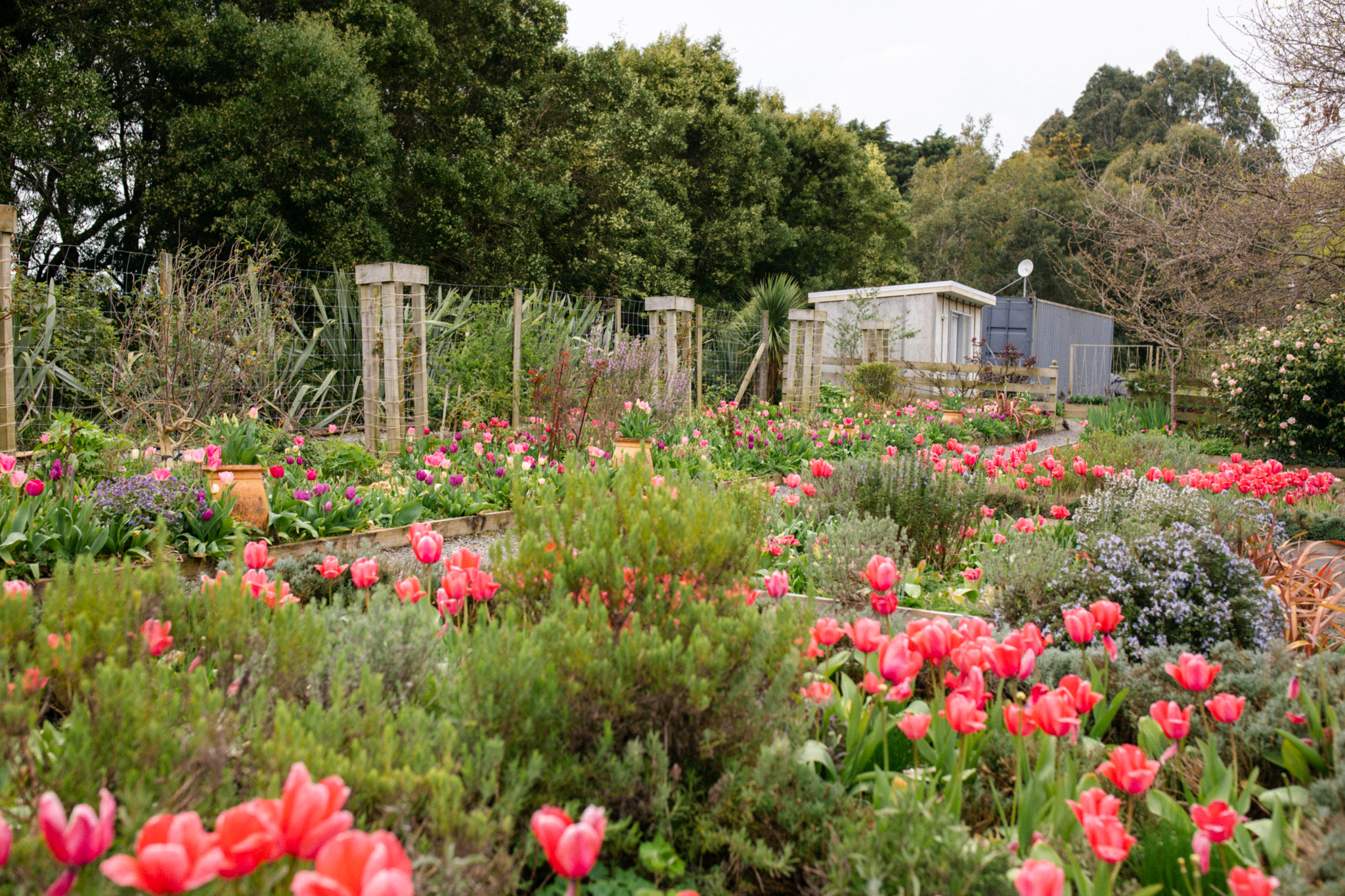
- Longbush Cottage gardens
- Interactive map of Longbush
- Coordinates: 41.156°S 175.608°E
- Country: New Zealand
- Region: Wellington
- Territorial authority: Carterton District
- Electorates: Wairarapa; Ikaroa-Rāwhiti (Māori)

Government
  - Territorial Authority: Carterton District Council
  - Regional council: Greater Wellington Regional Council
  - Mayor of Carterton: Steve Cretney
  - Wairarapa MP: Mike Butterick
  - Ikaroa-Rāwhiti MP: Cushla Tangaere-Manuel

Area
  - Total: 73.30 km^{2} (28.30 sq mi)
- Elevation: 118.9 m (390 ft)

Population (2023 census)
  - Total: 195
  - Density: 2.66/km^{2} (6.89/sq mi)
- Time zone: UTC+12 (NZST)
  - Summer (DST): UTC+13 (NZDT)
- Postcode(s): 5884
- Area code: 06

Longbush is a small rural community in the Carterton District, Wairarapa (within the Wellington Region) of New Zealand's North Island. Established in 1902 under the Land for Settlements Consolidation Act 1900, it once formed part of a large estate along with neighbouring Table-lands. Today, it remains a pastoral area with fewer than 200 residents, notable for its scenic valleys, farming character, and heritage features. Longbush Cottage, located within the community, has emerged as a modern garden destination.

== History ==
Longbush was formally surveyed and incorporated into the government’s settlement scheme under the Land for Settlements Act in 1902. The estate, held by lessees including Tully Brothers, included a homestead and was divided into sections of varying acreage.

In 1904, local settlers petitioned for a school, which opened the following year. The school served the community until its closure in 1968 when it was consolidated with nearby Gladstone School. The school building continues to be used as a children’s play centre and occasional community hall.

Infrastructure grew steadily through the early 20th century: the flax mill operated briefly in 1908 before closing due to rising labour costs, and that same year the road linking Longbush and Martinborough was completed with the last bridge opening. Telephone sub-exchanges were agreed in December 1908, and by 1909 a cheese factory had been established, producing cheese for export to London by 1915.

== Geography ==
Longbush lies in a valley framed by the Ponatahi Hills (440 metres (1,440 ft)) to the west and the southern slopes of the Maungaraki Range (500 metres (1,600 ft)) to the east. The topography reflects the region’s rural character, blending pastoral flats with steeper, more rugged hill country. The Gladstone, Central Plains and Martinborough areas border the north and west, while Hinakura, Tuturumuri, and Huangarua bound the eastern and southern sides.

== Demography ==
Longbush locality covers 73.30 km^{2} (28.30 sq mi). It is part of the larger Gladstone statistical area.

Historical population
| Year | Pop. | ±% p.a. |
|---|---|---|
| 2006 | 123 | — |
| 2013 | 153 | +3.17% |
| 2018 | 183 | +3.65% |
| 2023 | 195 | +1.28% |

Gladstone had a population of 195 in the 2023 New Zealand census, an increase of 12 people (6.6%) since the 2018 census, and an increase of 42 people (27.5%) since the 2013 census. There were 96 males and 99 females in 75 dwellings. 1.5% of people identified as LGBTIQ+. The median age was 46.5 years (compared with 38.1 years nationally). There were 42 people (21.5%) aged under 15 years, 27 (13.8%) aged 15 to 29, 93 (47.7%) aged 30 to 64, and 36 (18.5%) aged 65 or older.

People could identify as more than one ethnicity. The results were 93.8% European (Pākehā), and 13.8% Māori. English was spoken by 100.0%, Māori by 1.5%, and other languages by 4.6%. No language could be spoken by 1.5% (e.g. too young to talk). New Zealand Sign Language was known by 1.5%. The percentage of people born overseas was 13.8, compared with 28.8% nationally.

Religious affiliations were 21.5% Christian, 1.5% Buddhist, 1.5% New Age, and 1.5% other religions. People who answered that they had no religion were 67.7%, and 7.7% of people did not answer the census question.

Of those at least 15 years old, 45 (29.4%) people had a bachelor's or higher degree, 90 (58.8%) had a post-high school certificate or diploma, and 18 (11.8%) people exclusively held high school qualifications. The median income was $52,700, compared with $41,500 nationally. 27 people (17.6%) earned over $100,000 compared to 12.1% nationally. The employment status of those at least 15 was 93 (60.8%) full-time, 33 (21.6%) part-time, and 3 (2.0%) unemployed.

Residents are primarily engaged in pastoral farming—sheep, dairy, beef, pigs, and deer—as well as agriculture-related work and small-scale lifestyle blocks. The local hapū is Ngāti Hikawera, part of the Ngāti Kahungunu iwi.

== Notable people ==
- Hamuera Tamahau Mahupuku (c.1842 – 14 January 1904), tribal leader, runholder, assessor, and newspaper proprietor. Mahupuku Road, Longbush is named after him.

== Events ==
A small number of local annual events take place, including:

- November: the Wairarapa Garden Tour, in which Longbush Cottage participates.
- November: Scarecrow's Big Day Out, a community festival held in the Gladstone area.
- Wednesday mornings: Longbush Playgroup, a local parent–child gathering.
