= Mabel Mangakāhia =

Ngati Whanaunga and Te Rarawa; district nurse

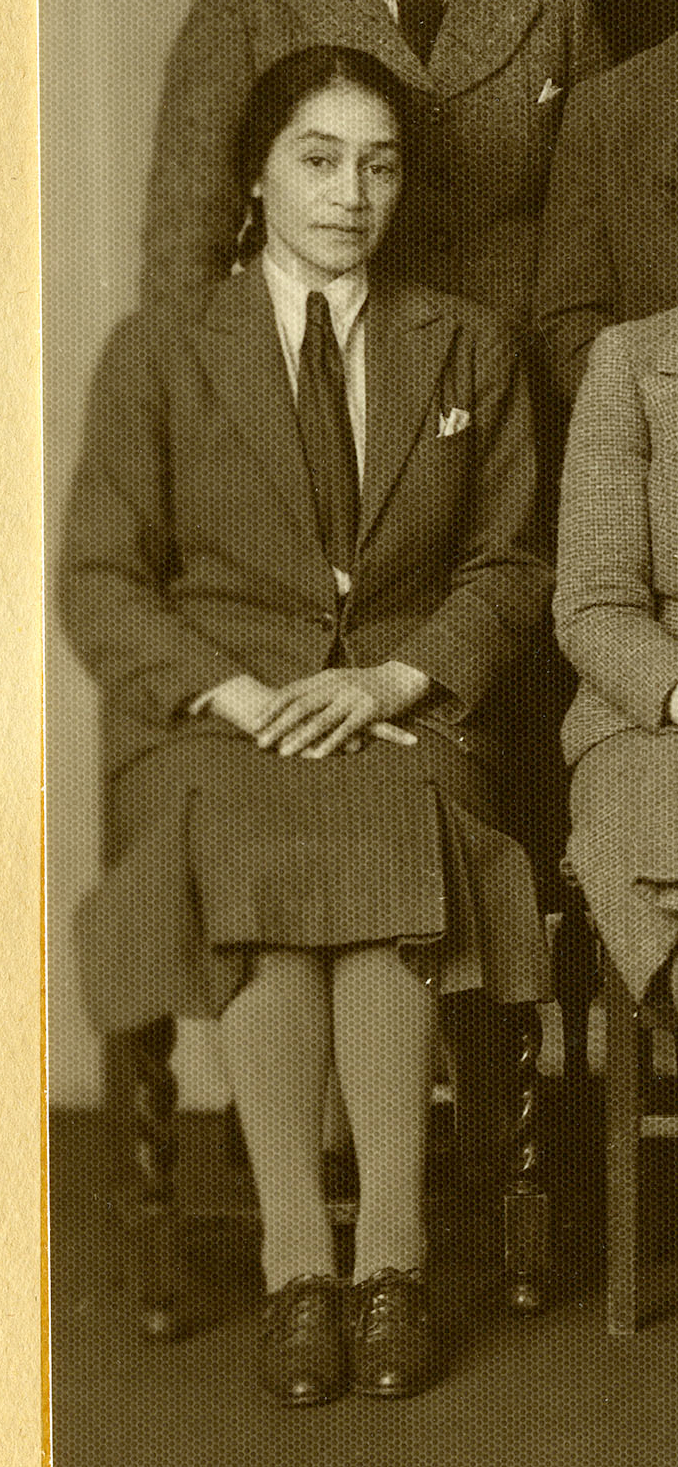
Mangakāhia in her post graduate school class photo in 1939

Mēpara Te Aowhaitini Mangakāhia (4 September 1899 – 23 August 1940), known by the anglicised version Mabel of her given name, was a New Zealand district nurse who provided health support to Māori communities across the North Island. She was the most eminent and successful Māori nurse of her day.

Of Māori descent, she identified with the Ngāti Whanaunga and Te Rarawa iwi. She was born in Whangapoua on Coromandel Peninsula in New Zealand on 4 September 1899, the daughter of Meri Mangakāhia and Hāmiora Mangakāhia. She attended Auckland Girls' Grammar School and Queen Victoria School for Maori Girls.

She completed her general nursing studies in Auckland in 1923. She did her maternity nursing studies at St Helens Hospital in Auckland in 1927. In 1939, Mangakāhia became one of the first Māori women to complete a postgraduate nursing studies course. The image, taken in Wellington, is of her graduating class.

In 1925 she became assistant district health nurse in Rawene. She was one of a few qualified Maori district nurses serving Maori communities. After taking a midwifery course in 1928 she transferred to Auckland as a district nurse in 1929. In 1930 she transferred to Tokaanu where the Tūwharetoa Trust Board contributed to the upkeep of her position. In the 1930s she worked in Ōtaki, Te Araroa and Hamilton. Much of her work involved travel to and from Māori communities.

Mangakāhia died of cancer in 1940 aged 40. She is buried at Whangapoua.
