= Hāmiora Mangakāhia =

Ngati Whanaunga leader, politician (1838–1918)

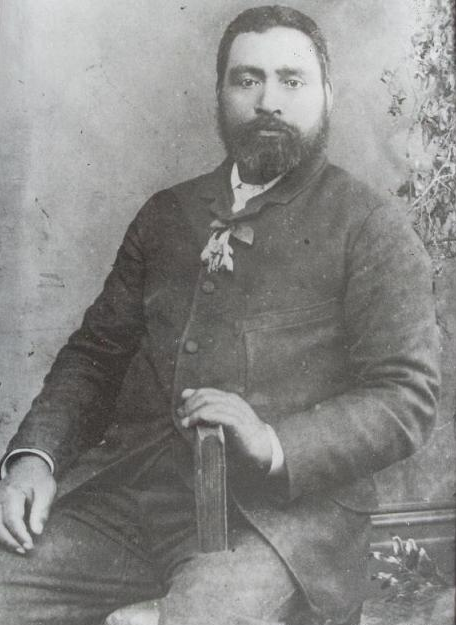
- Mangakāhia c. 1880

1st Premier of the Te Kotahitanga (Māori Parliament)
- In office June 1892 – July 1893
- Preceded by: Position established
- Succeeded by: Hoani Te Whatahoro Jury
- In office 1895–1898
- Preceded by: Hoani Te Whatahoro Jury

Member of the Te Kotahitanga (Māori Parliament)
- In office June 1892 – 1902

Personal details
- Born: 1830 Coromandel Peninsula, New Zealand
- Died: 4 June 1918
- Spouse: Meri Te Tai Mangakāhia
- Profession: Politician

Hāmiora Mangakāhia (1838 – 4 June 1918) was a prominent Māori chief and the first Premier of Te Kotahitanga, the movement for an independent Māori parliament in New Zealand in the 1890s. Of Ngāti Whanaunga descent, Mangakāhia was born in Whangapoua on the Coromandel Peninsula. In 1892 he was one of 19 chiefs elected to represent Te Tai Hauāuru in the Lower House of Te Kotahitanga at its first sitting at Waipatu Marae. As a leading organiser of the movement, he was nominated by fellow chiefs Henare Tomoana and Te Keepa Te Rangihiwinui to the position of Premier, which he held for the duration of the 1892 sitting of the parliament.

Prior to his involvement in Te Kotahitanga, Mangakāhia unsuccessfully contested the Western Maori electorate in the New Zealand Parliament in the 1881 and 1884 elections. In 1881, he came a distant second of four candidates, trailing Wiremu Te Wheoro by over 53% of the vote. In 1884, of eight candidates, he came seventh with 8.85% of the vote. Mangakāhia was also a frequent appellant to the Native Affairs Committee.

He was married to Meri Te Tai Mangakāhia, a leading figure in the movement for Women's suffrage in New Zealand. One of his daughters, Mabel Mangakāhia, was a notable nurse.
