= Te Keepa Te Rangi-pūawhe =

New Zealand Māori tribal leader (c. 1826–1905)

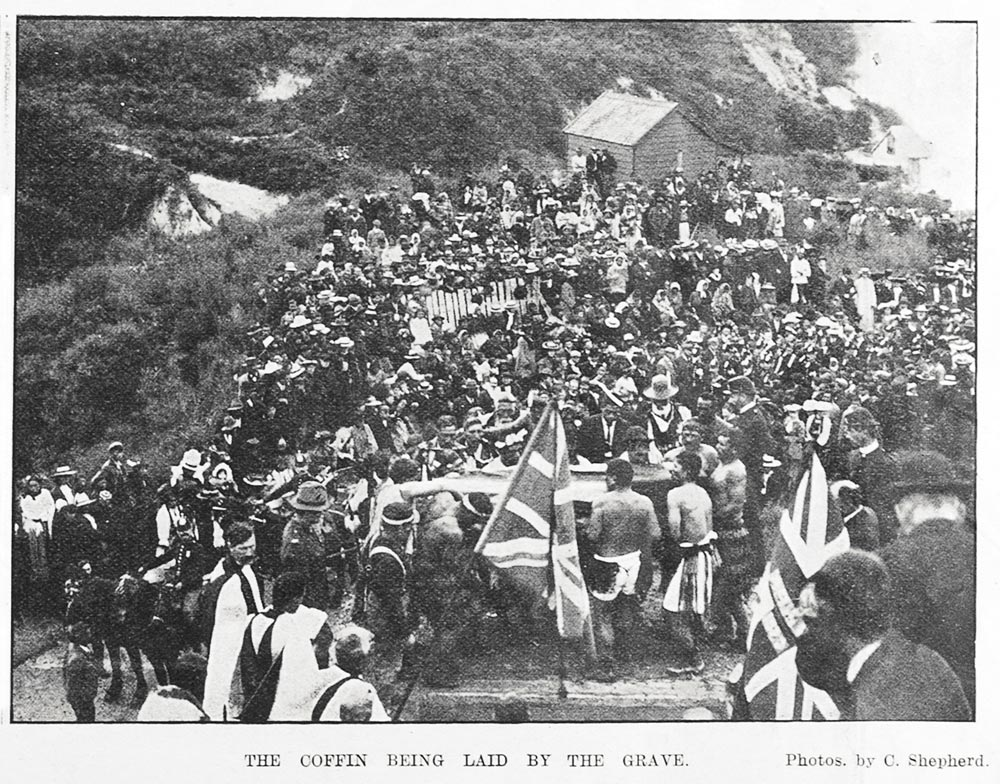
Tangi (funeral) of Te Keepa Te Rangi-pūawhe, July 1905

Te Keepa Te Rangi-pūawhe (c. 1826 – 27 June 1905) was a New Zealand Māori tribal leader of the Tūhourangi iwi, and a major in the New Zealand militia.

He was probably born at Motutawa pā, Tarawera, New Zealand, in about 1826. His father was Te Rangi-pūawhe of Tūhourangi and his mother was Hinatuituia of Tūhourangi and Ngāti Wāhiao. His father had led Tūhourangi in conflict with Ngāti Pikiao, before Tūhourangi left their home at Rotoiti and moved to Tarawera, and also fought in battles against Tūhoe and Ngāi Te Rangi.

In the wars of the 1860s Te Keepa Te Rangi-pūawhe supported the government. Te Keepa lived at Te Wairoa, by Lake Tarawera, and belonged to the Church of England. He was the senior chief of the district and guardian of the Pink and White Terraces at Lake Rotomahana. Te Keepa and his clan provided guides, transport, and Māori cultural entertainment for tourists visiting the Pink and White Terraces. After the 1886 eruption of Mount Tarawera, survivors sheltered in Te Keepa's European-style house before leaving for Ōhinemutu, where Ngāti Whakaue accommodated them temporarily. Most Tūhourangi people settled at Whakarewarewa or Ngāpuna, with their close relatives of Ngāti Wāhiao. One group of Tūhourangi settled at Thames on land provided by Ngāti Maru. In 1896 Te Keepa was elected to Te Kotahitanga, the Māori parliament.

He died on 27 June 1905. He was buried in July at Whakarewarewa with military honours. His grave was marked with a red granite monument.
