= Hōne Taare Tīkao =

Ngai Tahu leader, scholar, politician (1850–1927)

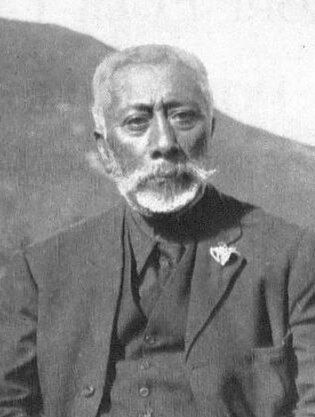
from: Cowan-Maori Folk-tales of the Port Hills

Hōne Taare Tīkao (1850 – 11 June 1927) was a New Zealand tribal leader, scholar and politician. Of Māori descent, he identified with the Ngāi Tahu iwi. He was born at Akaroa, New Zealand in about 1850.

He stood as a candidate for several elections in the Southern Maori electorate. One of his children was the master weaver Raukura Erana Gillies.
